= Portraits of Vincent van Gogh =

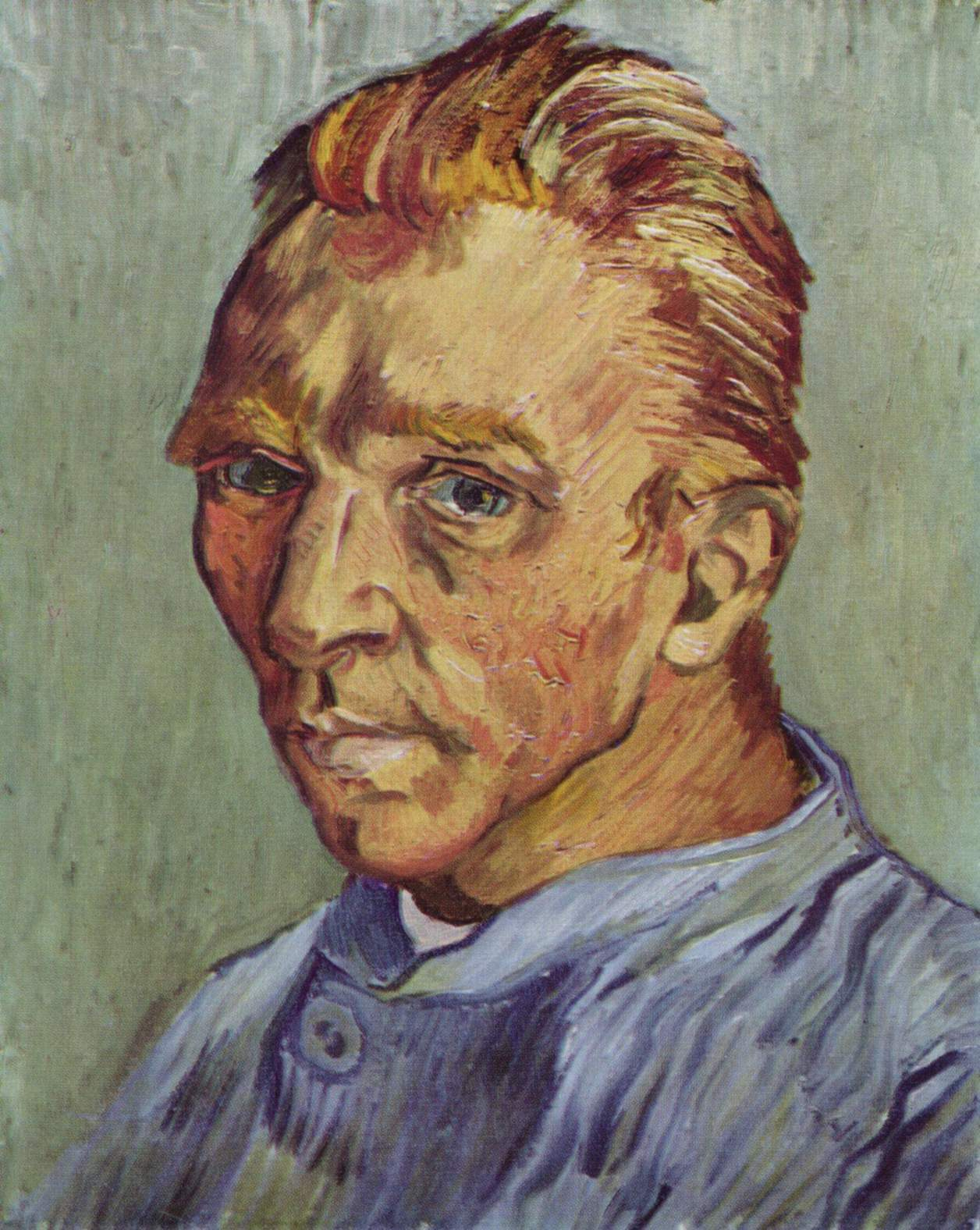
Vincent van Gogh, Self-portrait without beard, end September 1889, (F 525), oil on canvas, 40 × 31 cm., private collection. This may have been Van Gogh's last self-portrait. Given as a birthday gift to his mother.

The portraits of Vincent van Gogh (1853–1890) include self-portraits, portraits of him by other artists, and photographs—one of which is dubious—of the Dutch artist. Van Gogh's dozens of self-portraits were an important part of his œuvre as a painter. Most probably, van Gogh's self-portraits are depicting the face as it appeared in the mirror he used to reproduce his face, i.e. his right side in the image is in reality the left side of his face.

== Self-portraits ==
=== 1885 ===
On July 14, 2022, an almost certainly authentic self-portrait of van Gogh was uncovered under his 1885 painting "Head of a peasant woman". Lesley Stevenson, a conservator at the Scottish National Gallery of Modern Art, discovered it during an X-ray examination of their existing pieces. It shows a bearded van Gogh in a brimmed hat and a neckerchief around his throat. His left ear was clearly visible. The portrait is covered under layers of cardboard and glue, which experts are searching for ways to remove in order to confirm its authenticity. They believe it was painted when van Gogh moved to France and learnt about the work of the impressionists there, an experience that influenced his more colourful and expressive style that is much admired today. Van Gogh was known to often reuse his canvases or work on their reverse in order to save money. The X-ray image will be featured at a Royal Scottish Academy exhibit in Edinburgh and displayed using a specially made lightbox.

=== Paris 1886 ===
The first self-portrait by van Gogh that survived is dated 1886.

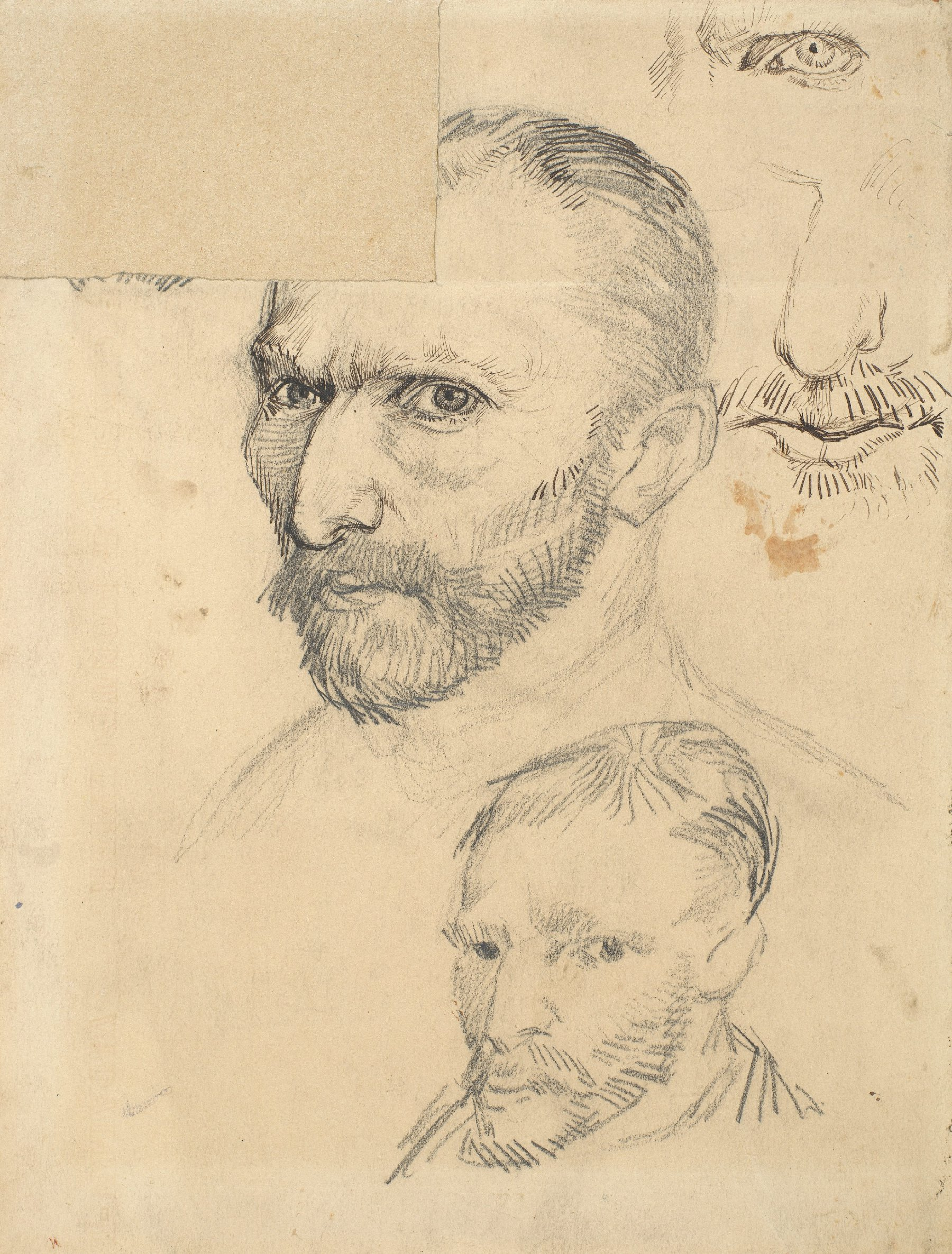
Two Self-Portraits and Several Details, Drawing, Paris, 1886
Van Gogh Museum, Amsterdam (F1378r)

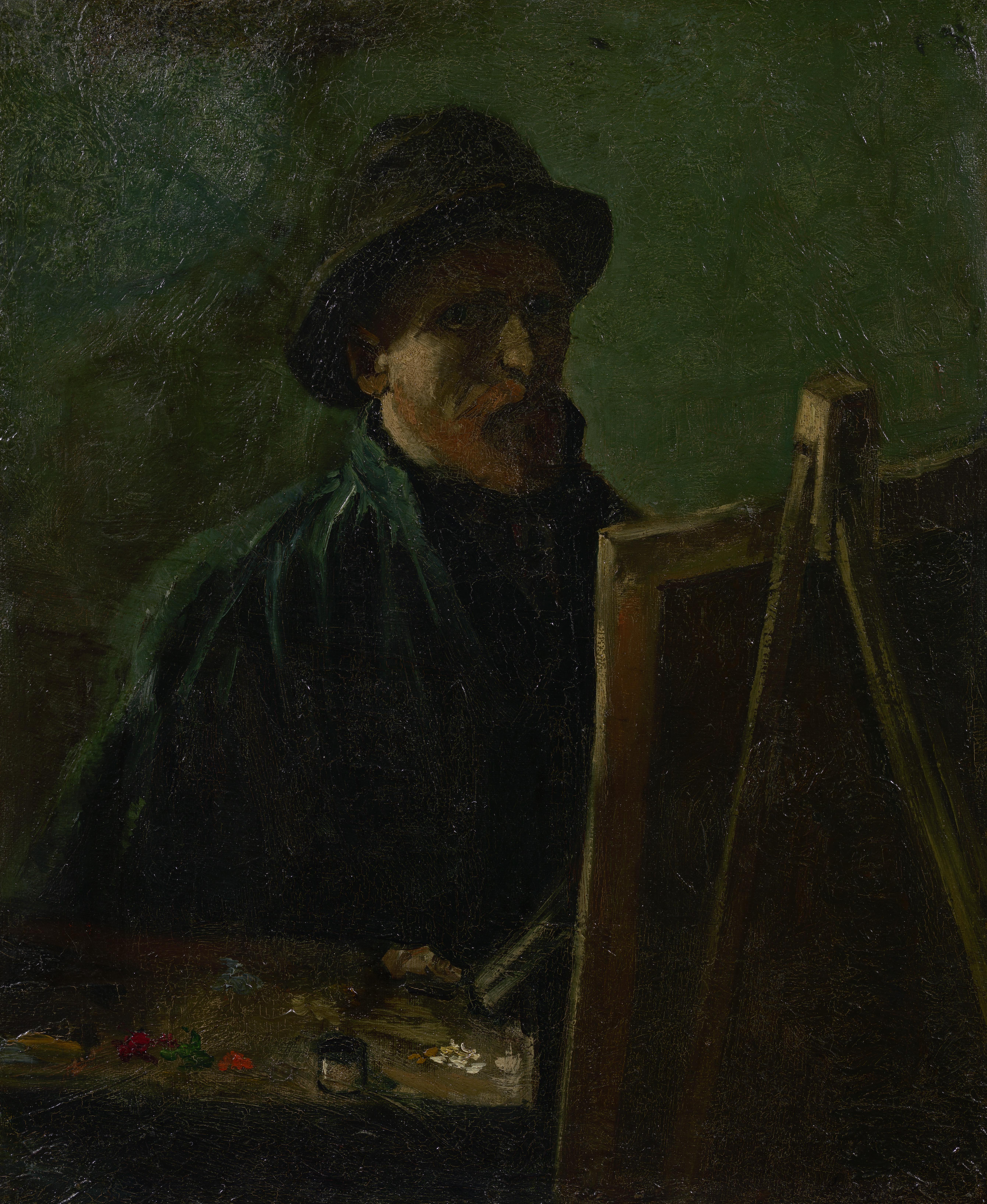
Self-Portrait with Dark Felt Hat at the Easel, 1886
Van Gogh Museum, Amsterdam (F181)

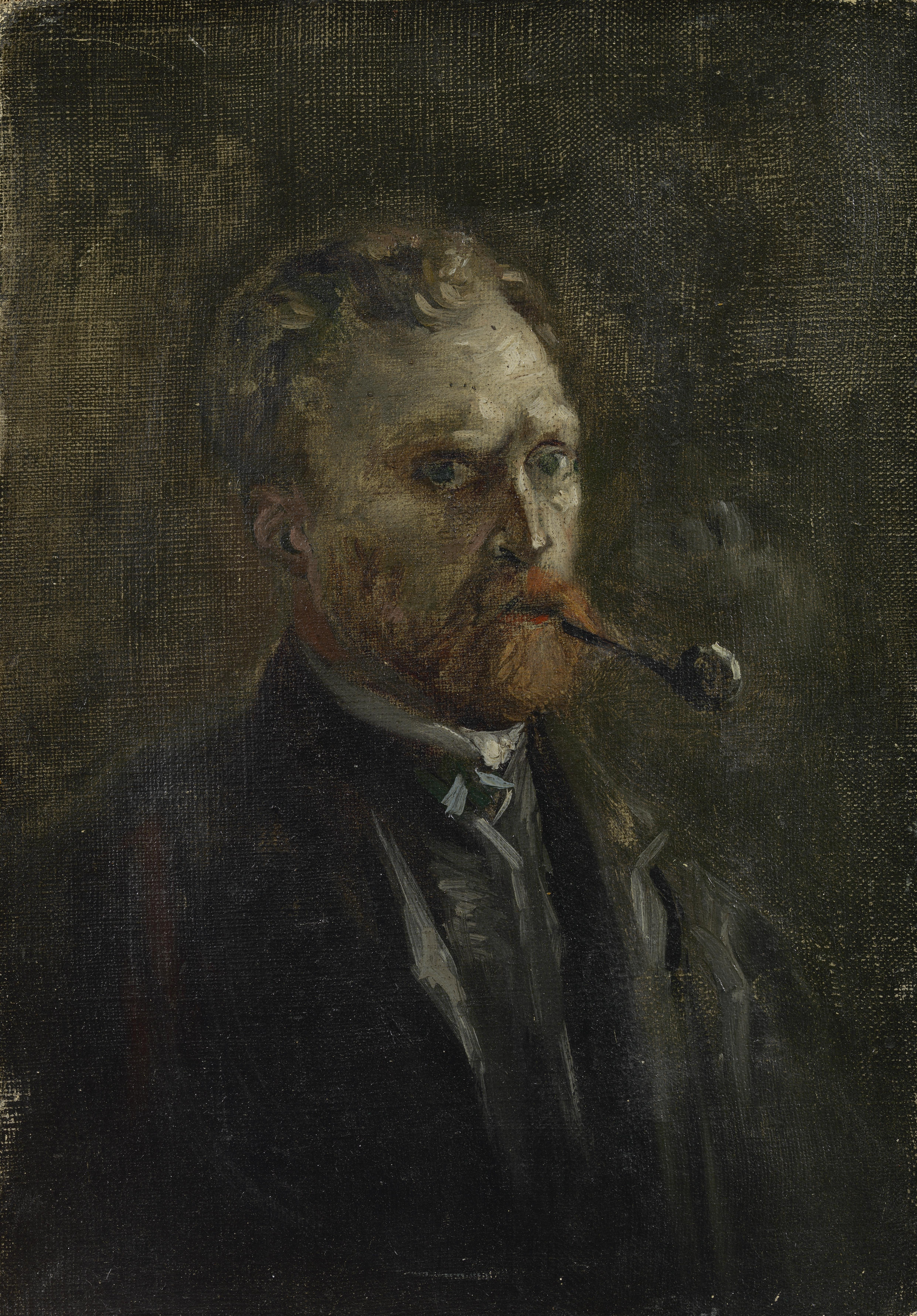
Self-Portrait with Pipe, 1886
Van Gogh Museum, Amsterdam (F208)

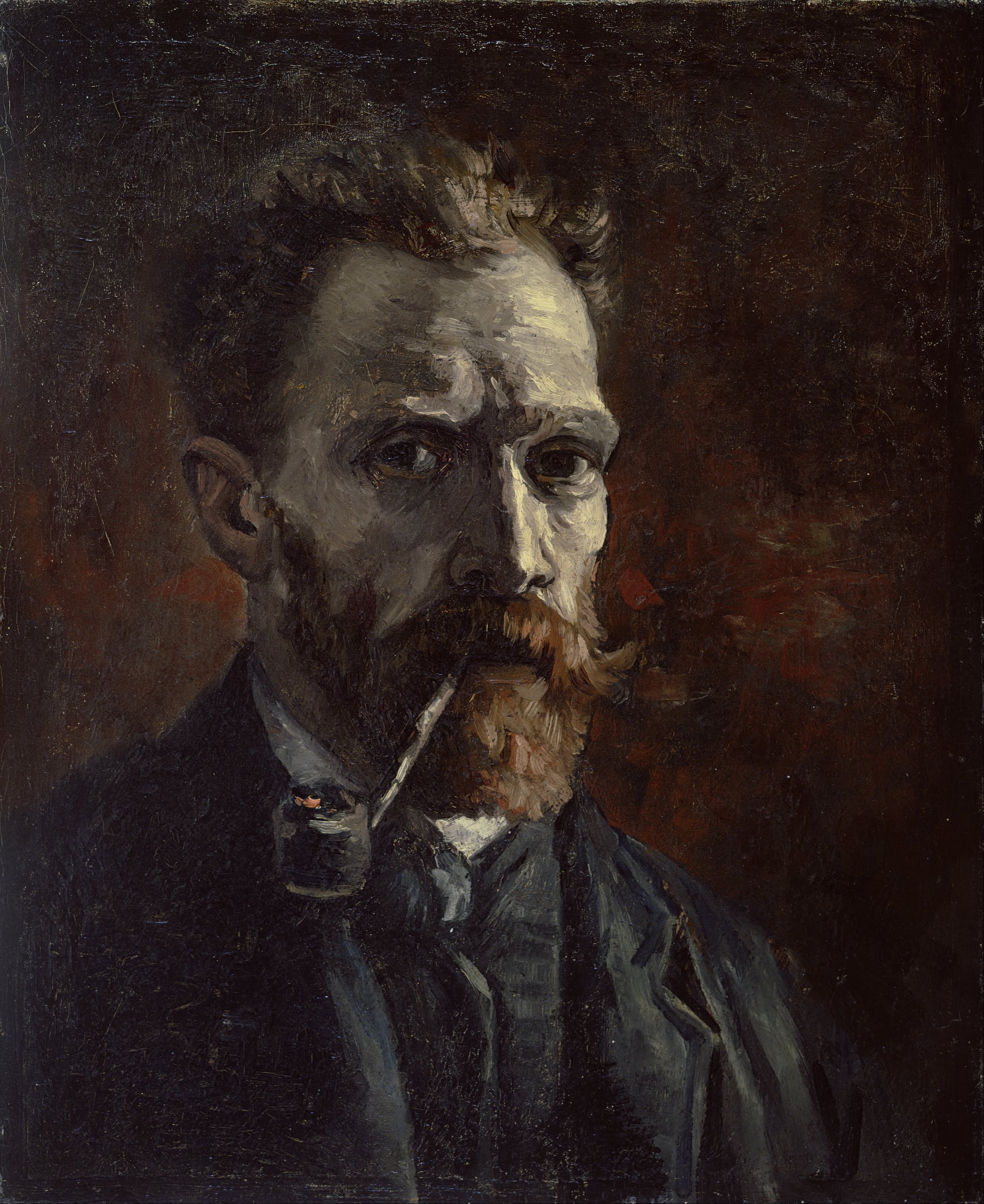
Self-Portrait with Pipe, 1886
Van Gogh Museum, Amsterdam (F180)

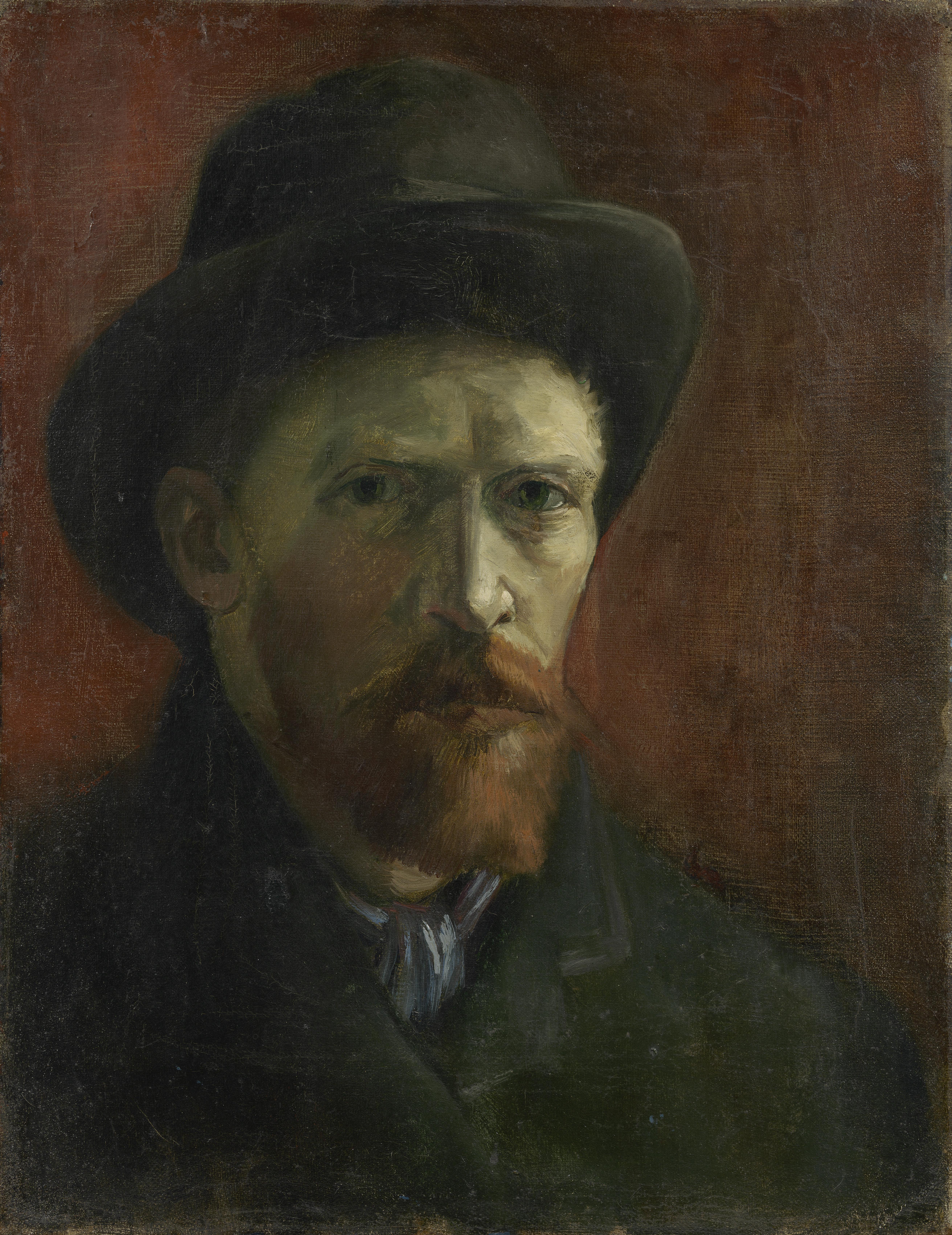
Self-Portrait with Dark Felt Hat, 1886
Van Gogh Museum, Amsterdam (F208a)

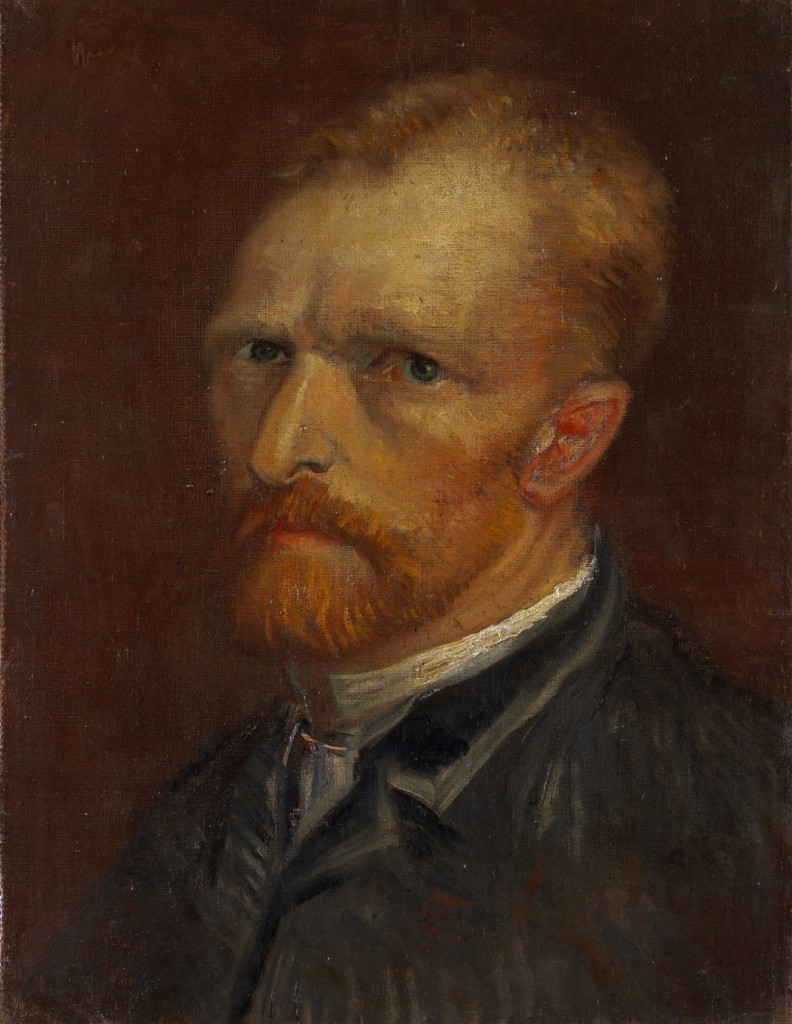
Self-Portrait, Autumn 1886, Paris
Gemeentemuseum Den Haag, The Hague (F187v)

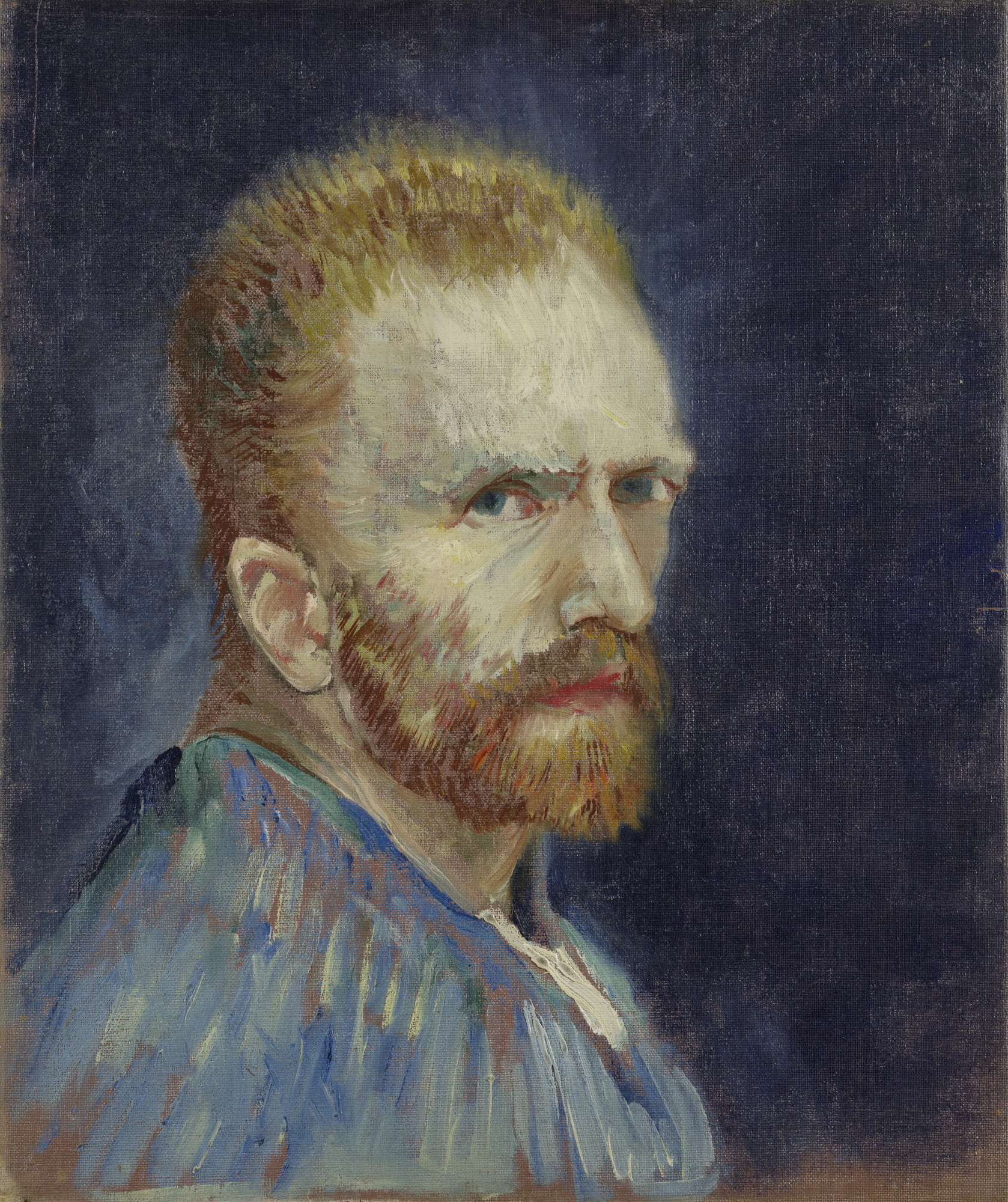
Self-Portrait, Winter 1886/87
Wadsworth Atheneum, Hartford (F268)

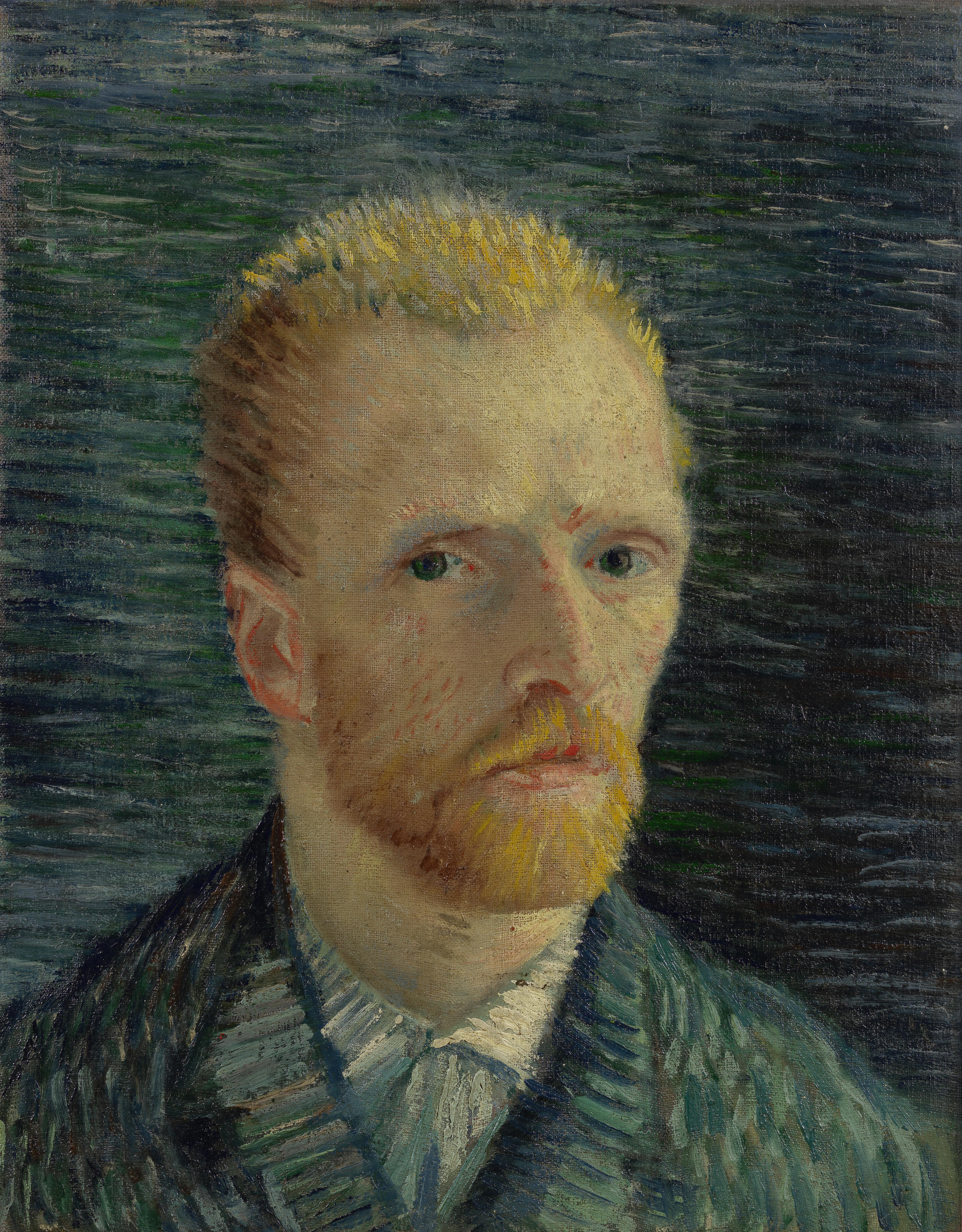
Self-Portrait, Winter 1886/87
Van Gogh Museum, Amsterdam (F269v)

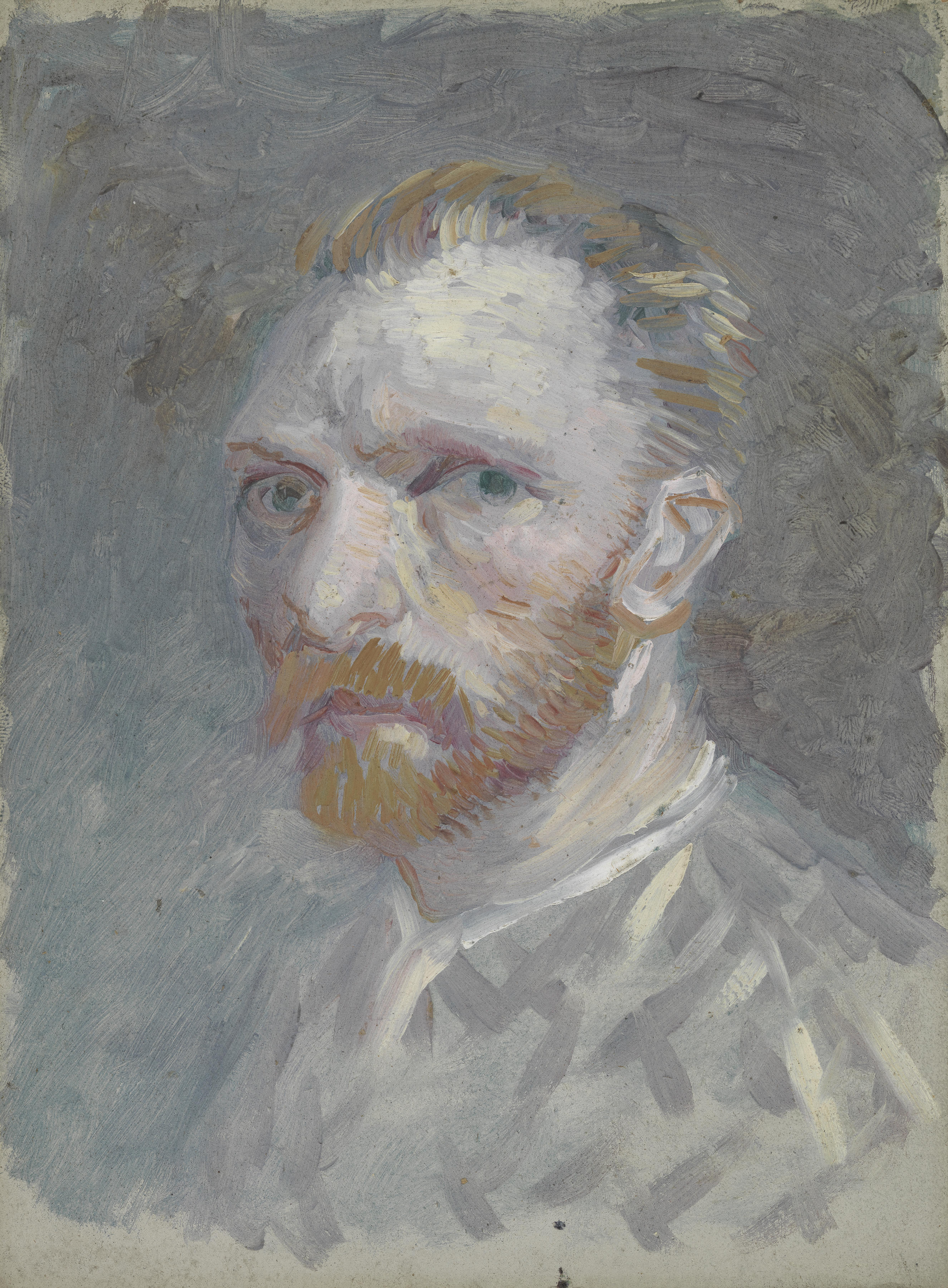
Self-Portrait, Winter 1886/87
Van Gogh Museum, Amsterdam (F267)

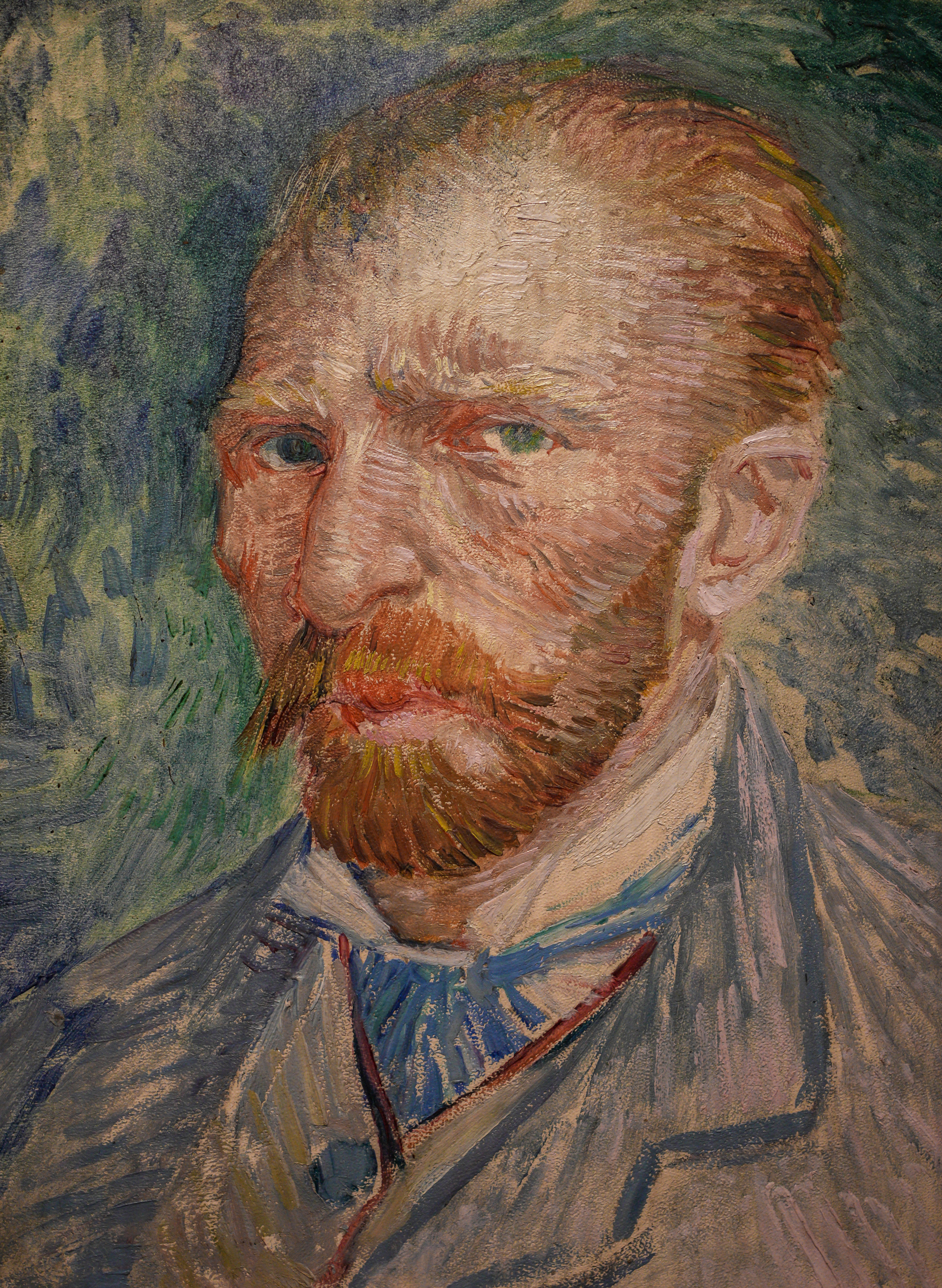
Self-Portrait, Winter 1886/87
Kröller-Müller Museum, Otterlo (F380)

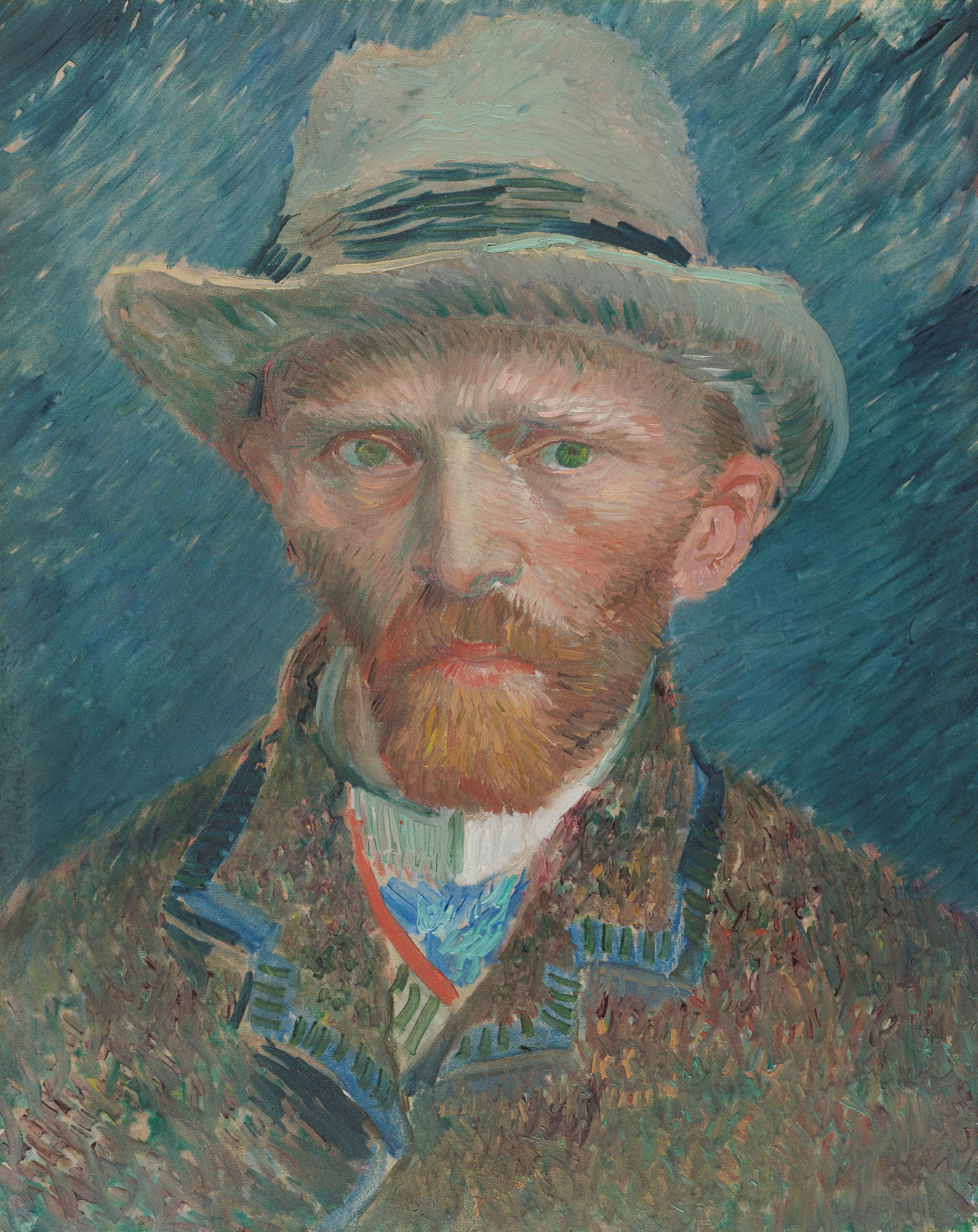
Self-Portrait, 1887
Oil on pasteboard, 42 cm x 34 cm
Rijksmuseum, Amsterdam (F295)

=== Paris 1887 ===
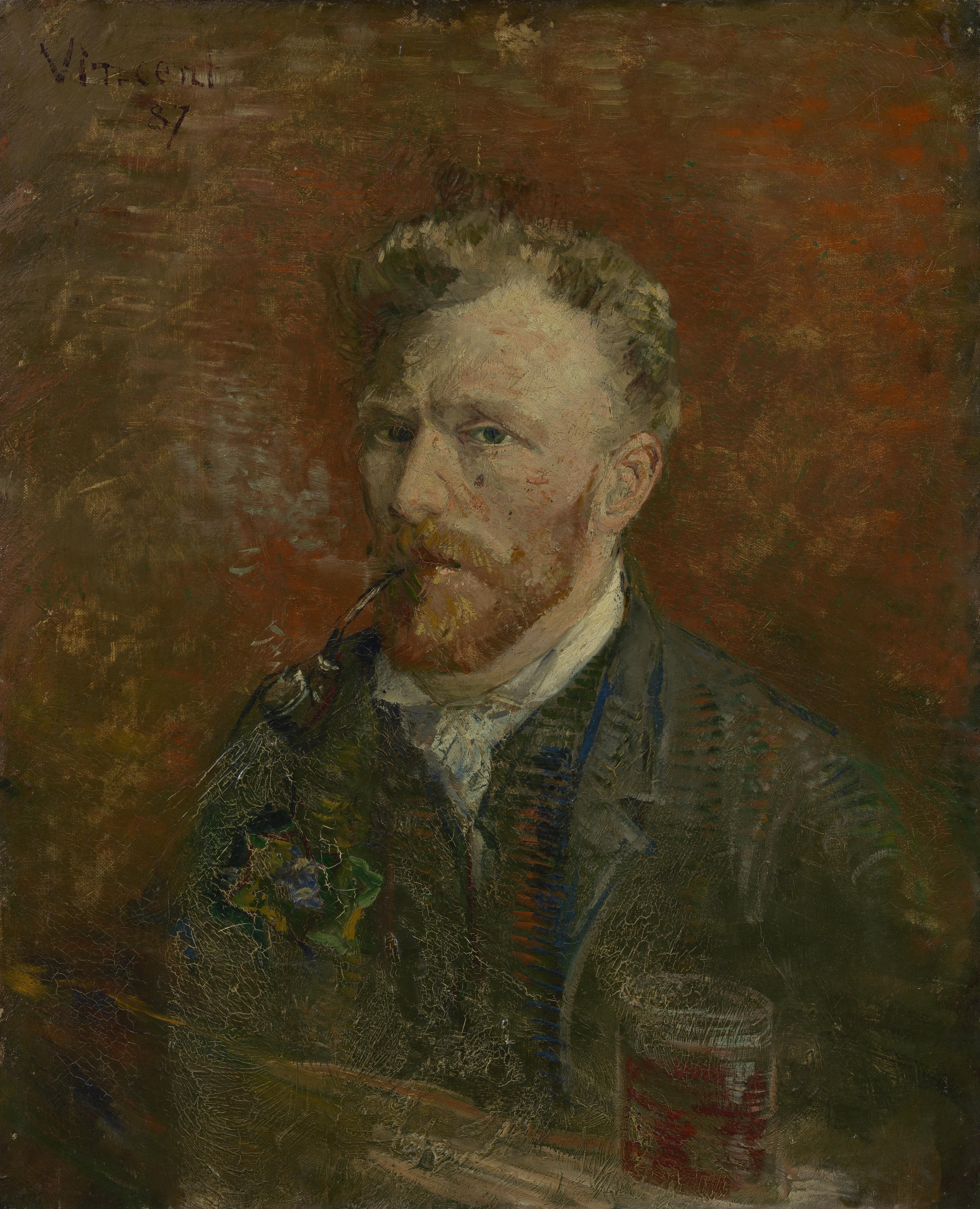
Self-Portrait with Pipe and Glass, 1887
Van Gogh Museum, Amsterdam (F263a)

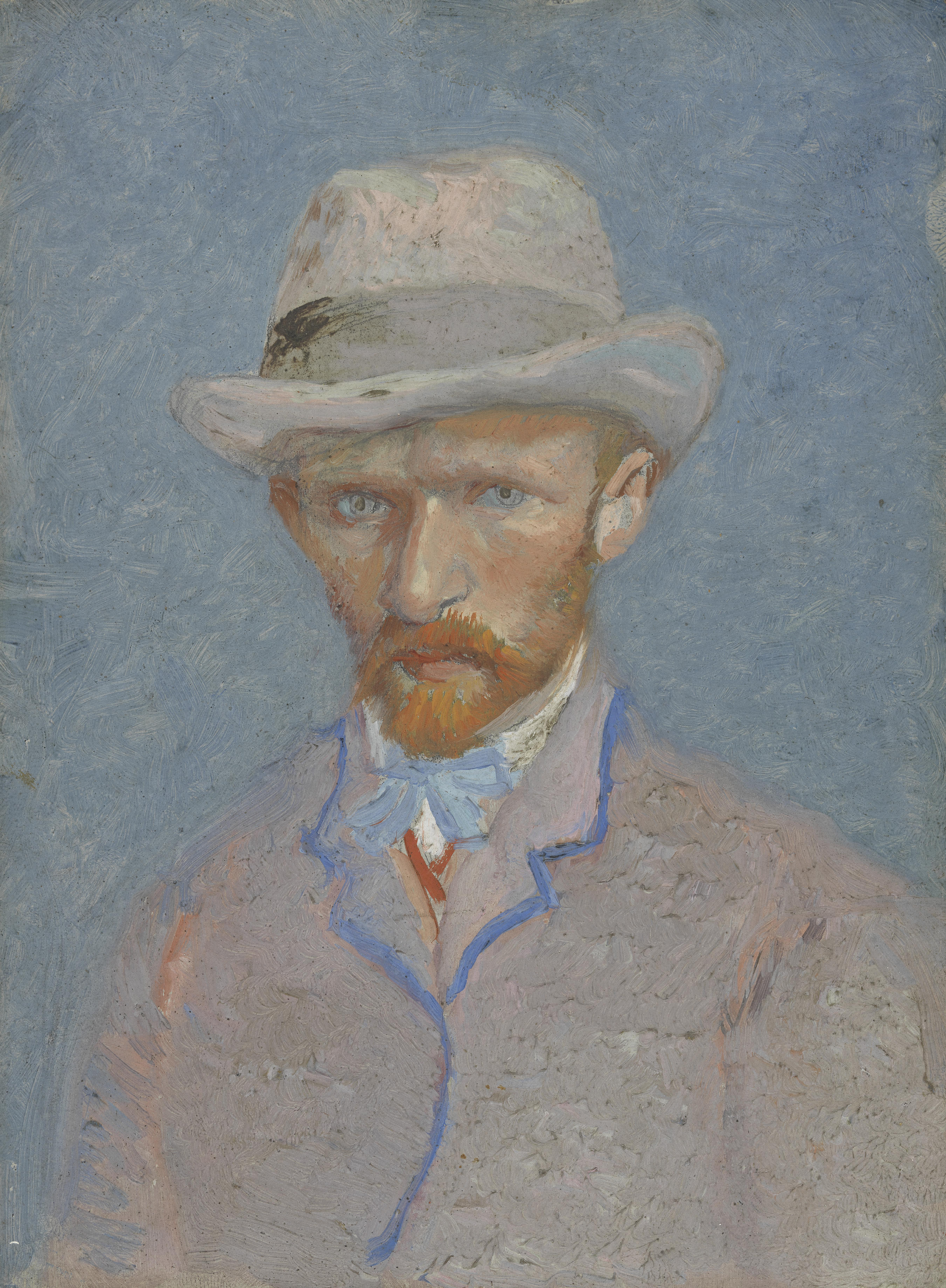
Self-Portrait with Grey Felt Hat, March/April 1887
Oil on pasteboard, 19 × 14 cm
Van Gogh Museum, Amsterdam (F296)

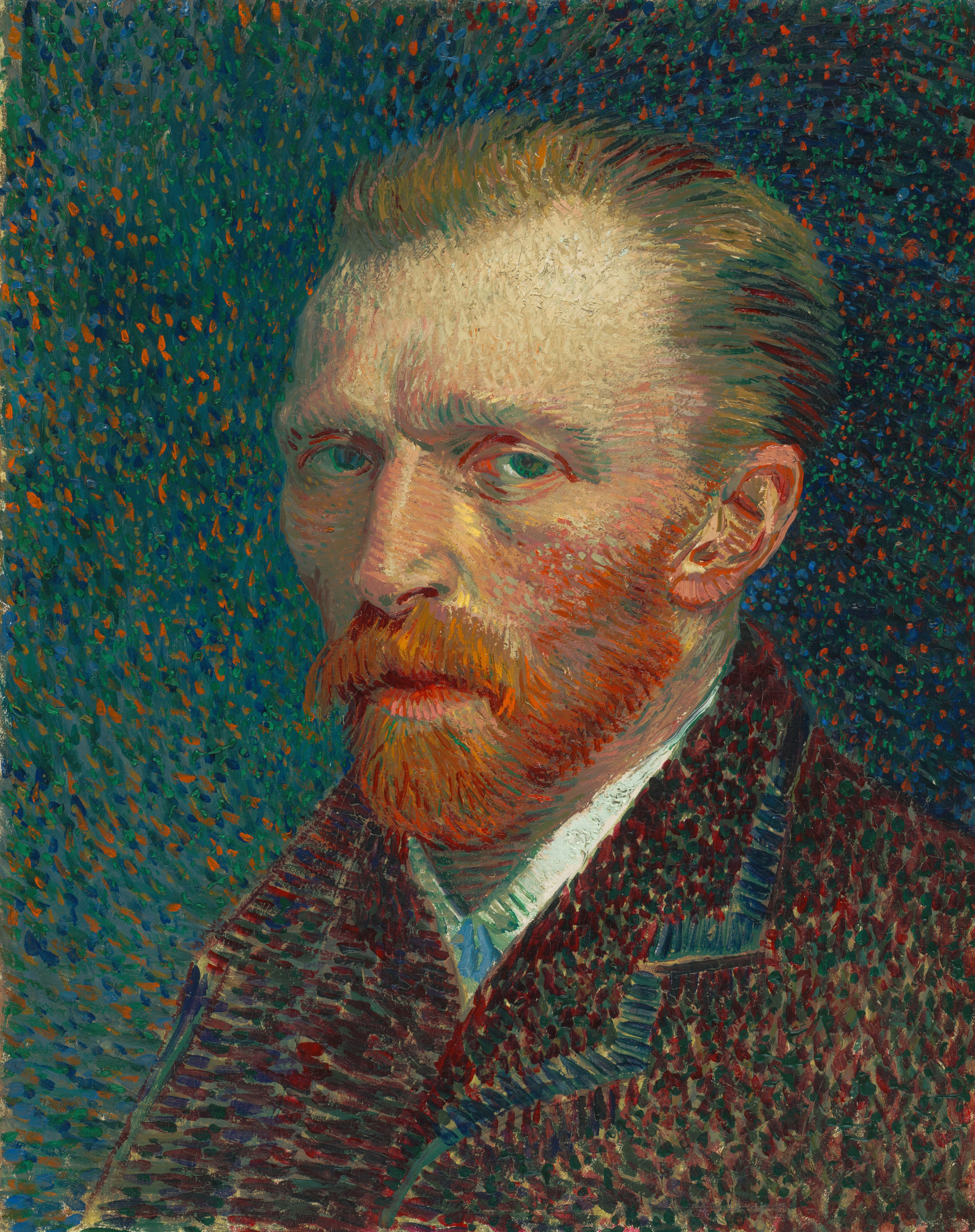
Self-Portrait, 1887
Oil on artist's board, mounted on cradled panel, 41 × 32.5 cm
Art Institute of Chicago (F345)

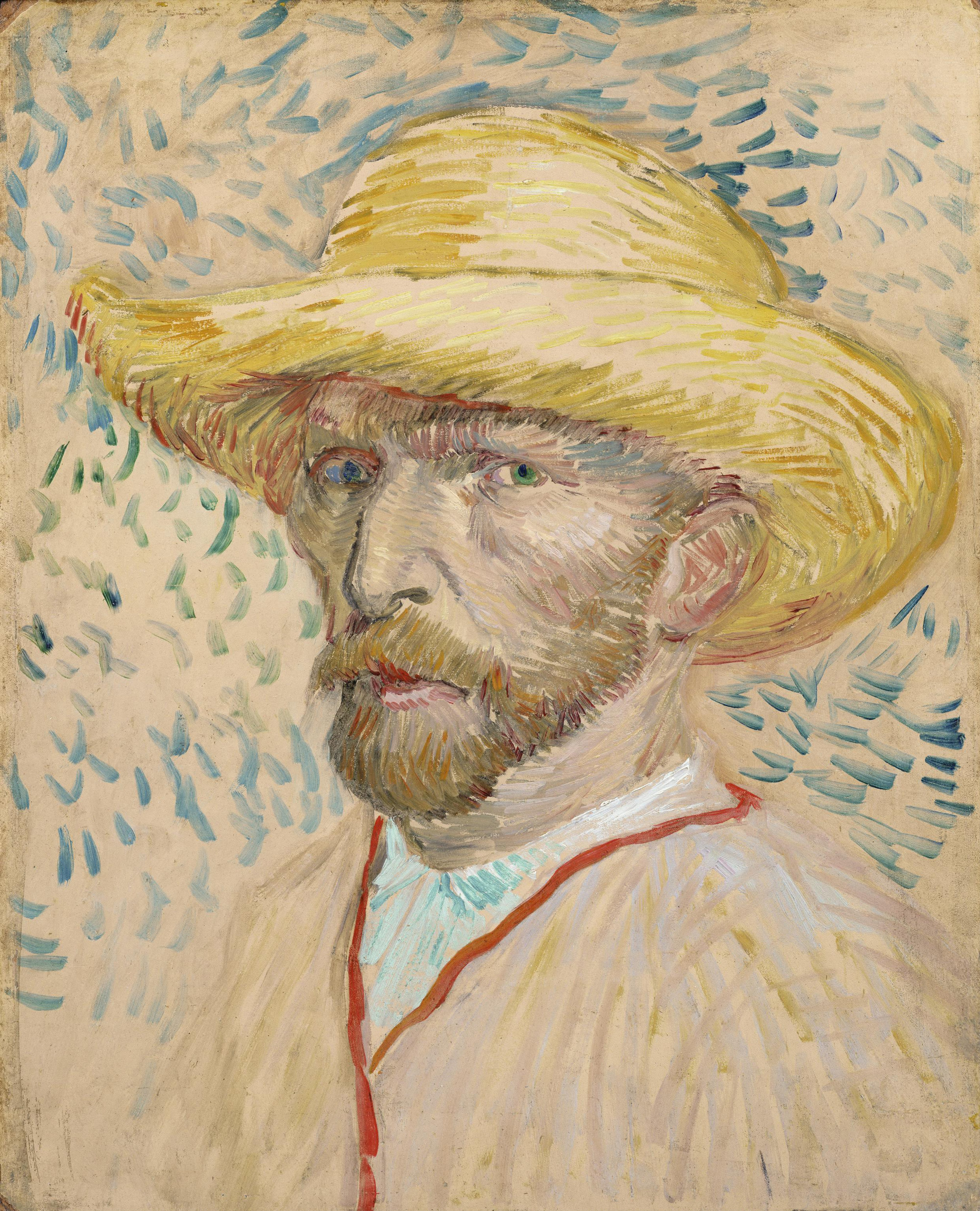
Self-Portrait with Straw Hat, Summer 1887
Van Gogh Museum, Amsterdam (F469)

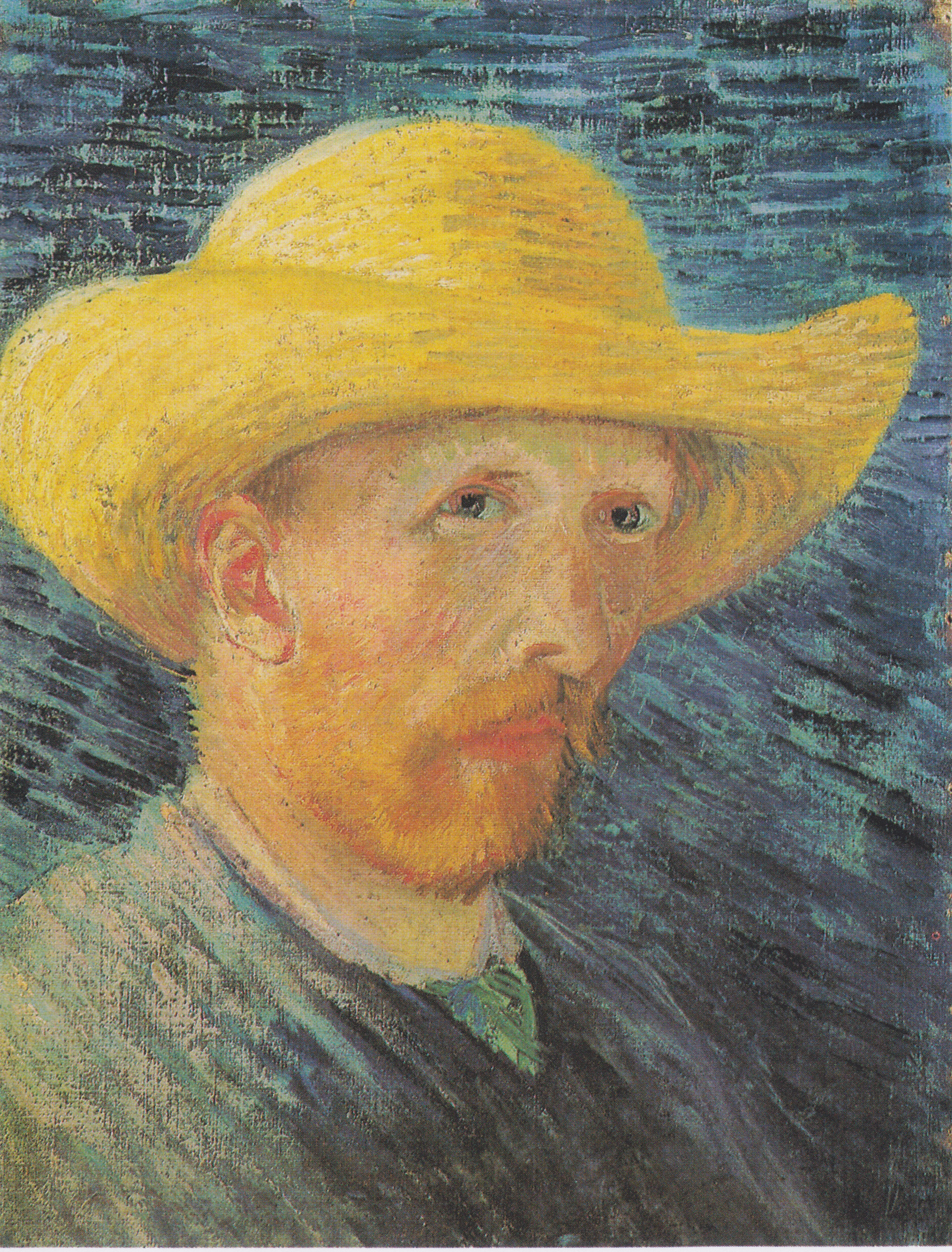
Self-Portrait with Straw Hat (reverse image), 1887
Van Gogh Museum, Amsterdam (F61v)

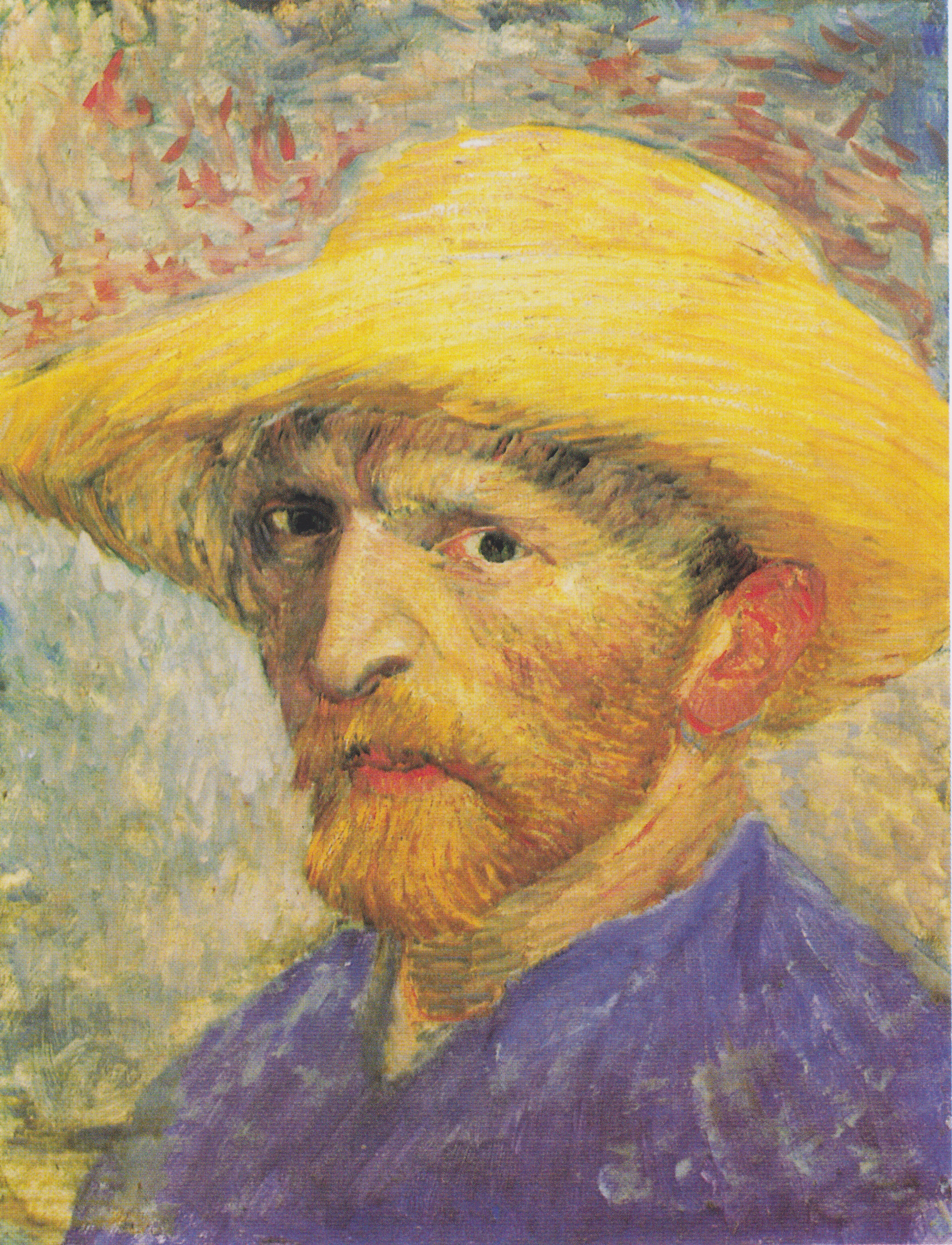
Self-Portrait with Straw Hat, Summer 1887
Oil on pasteboard, 34.9 × 26.7 cm
Detroit Institute of Arts (F526)

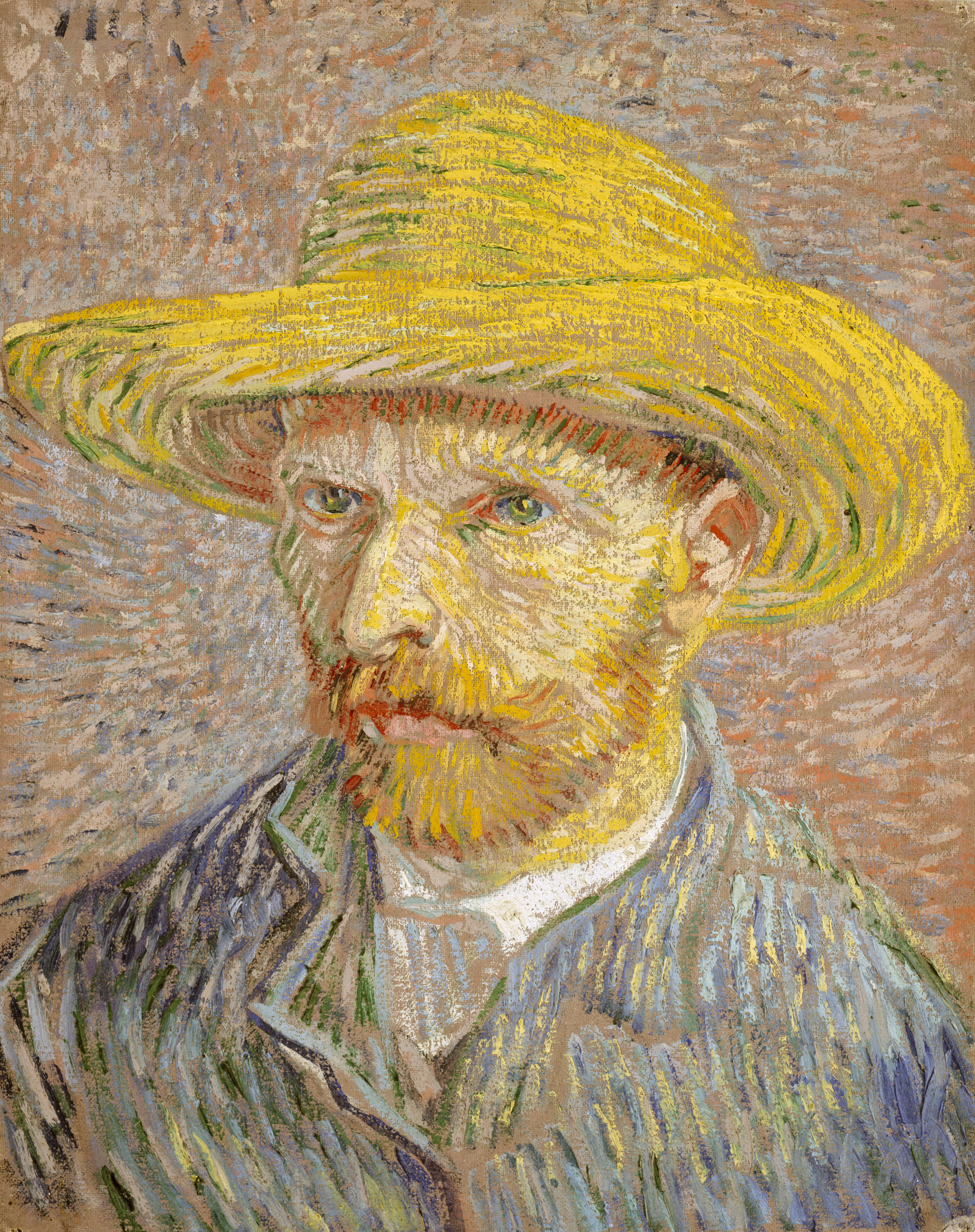
Self-Portrait with Straw Hat, 1887
Metropolitan Museum of Art (F365v)

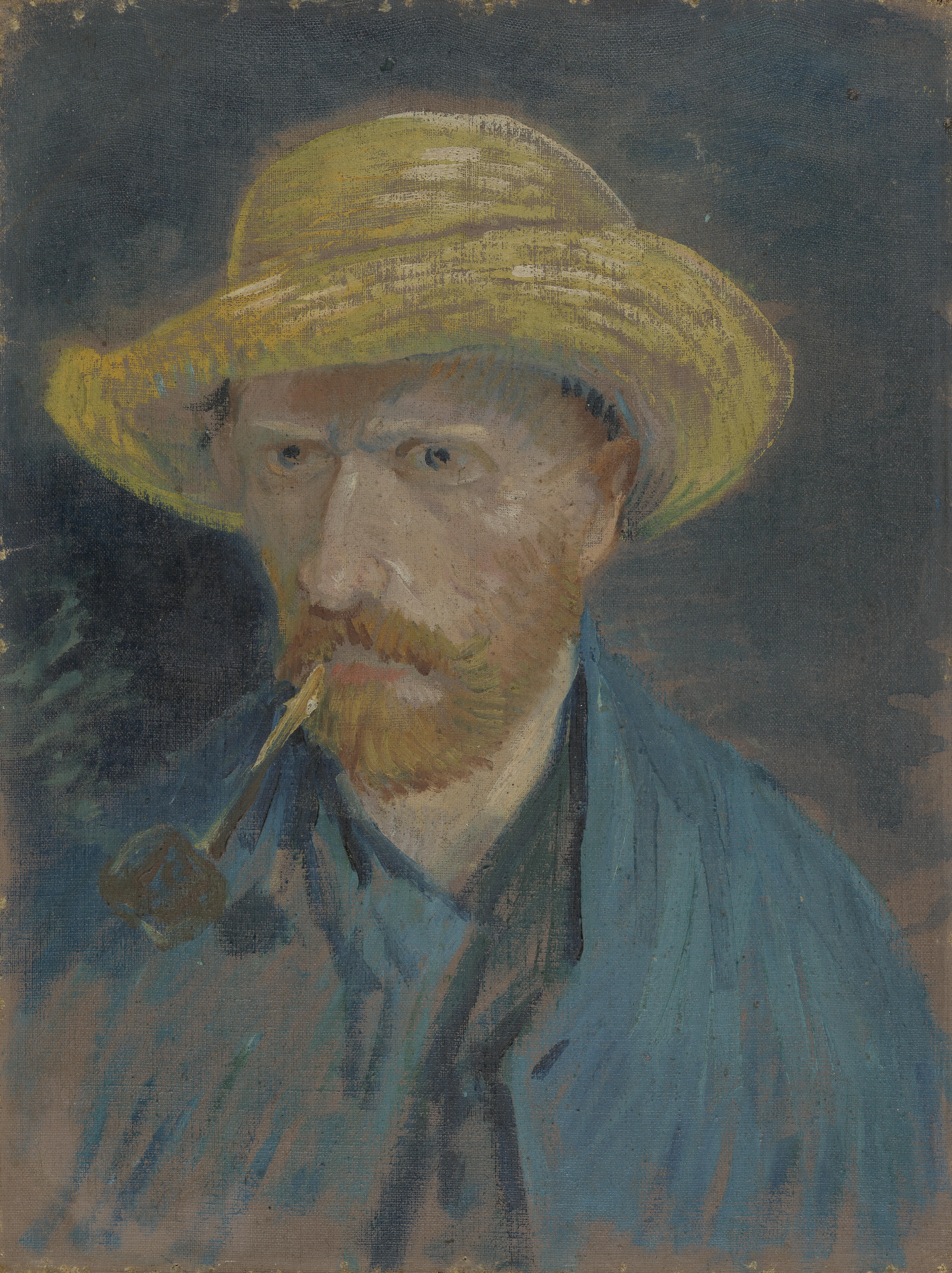
Self-Portrait with Straw Hat and a Pipe (reverse image), 1887
Van Gogh Museum, Amsterdam (F179v)

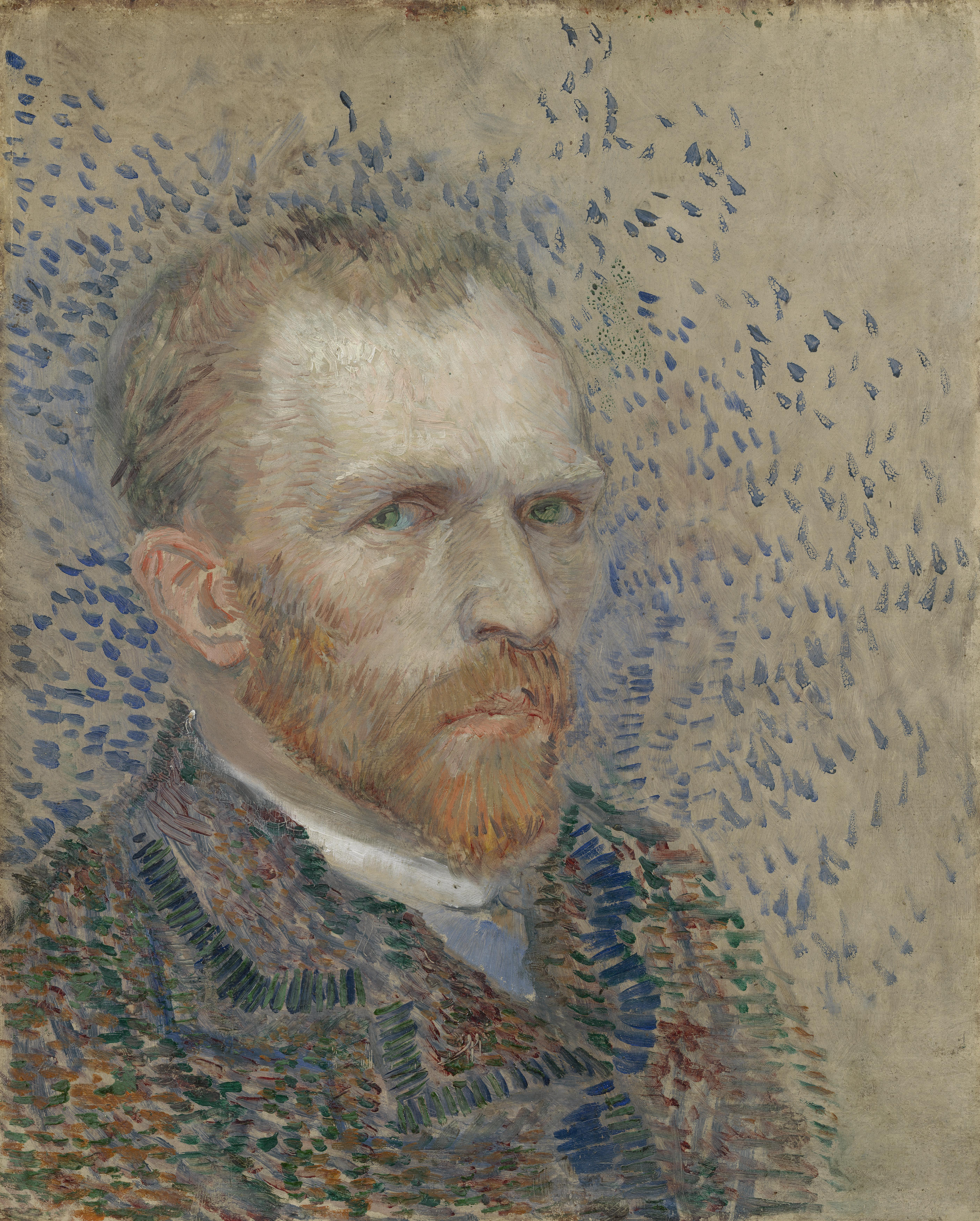
Self-Portrait, Summer 1887
Van Gogh Museum, Amsterdam (F356)

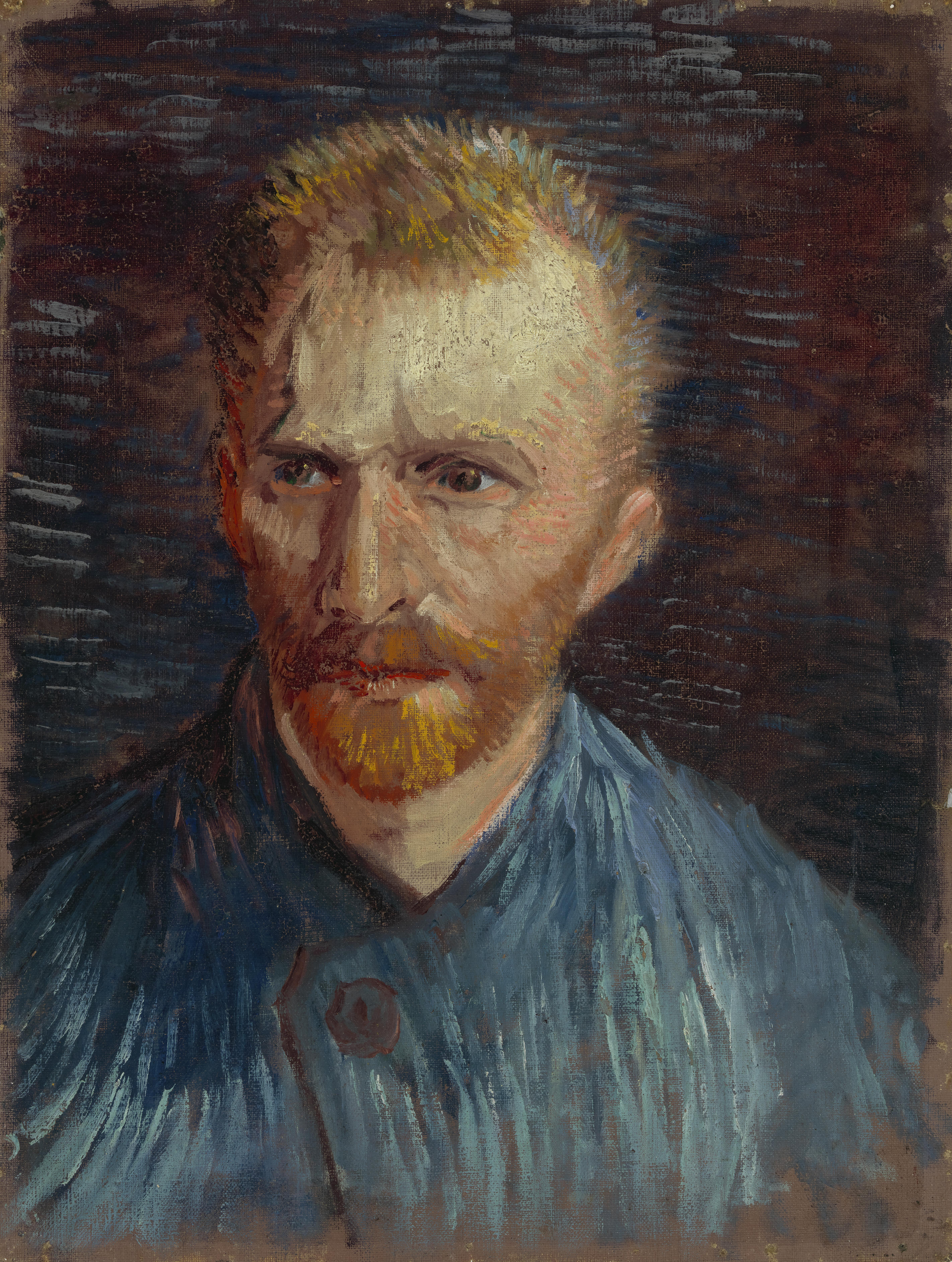
Self-Portrait, Summer 1887, Paris
Van Gogh Museum, Amsterdam (F77v)

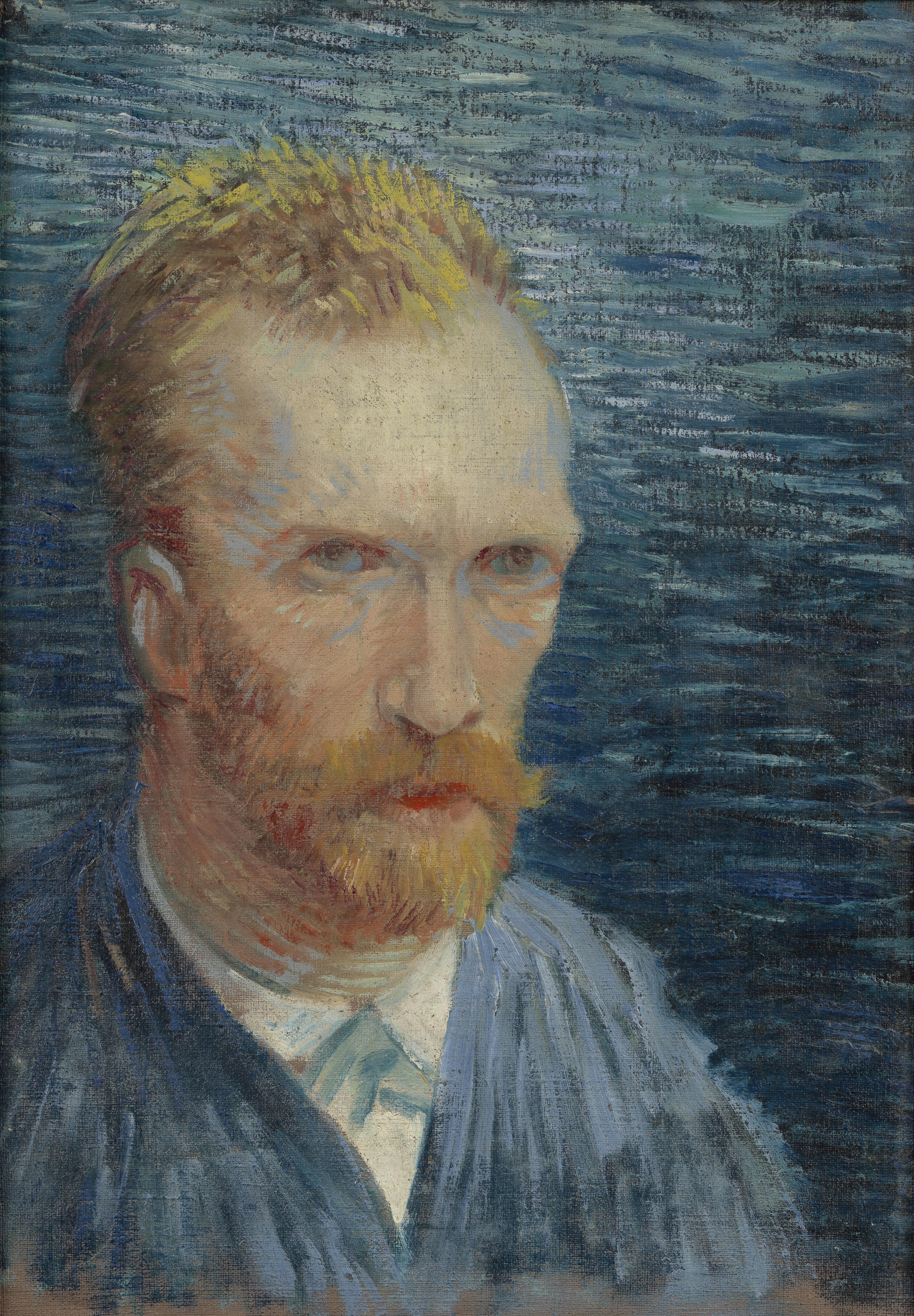
Self-Portrait, Summer 1887, Paris
Van Gogh Museum, Amsterdam (F109v)

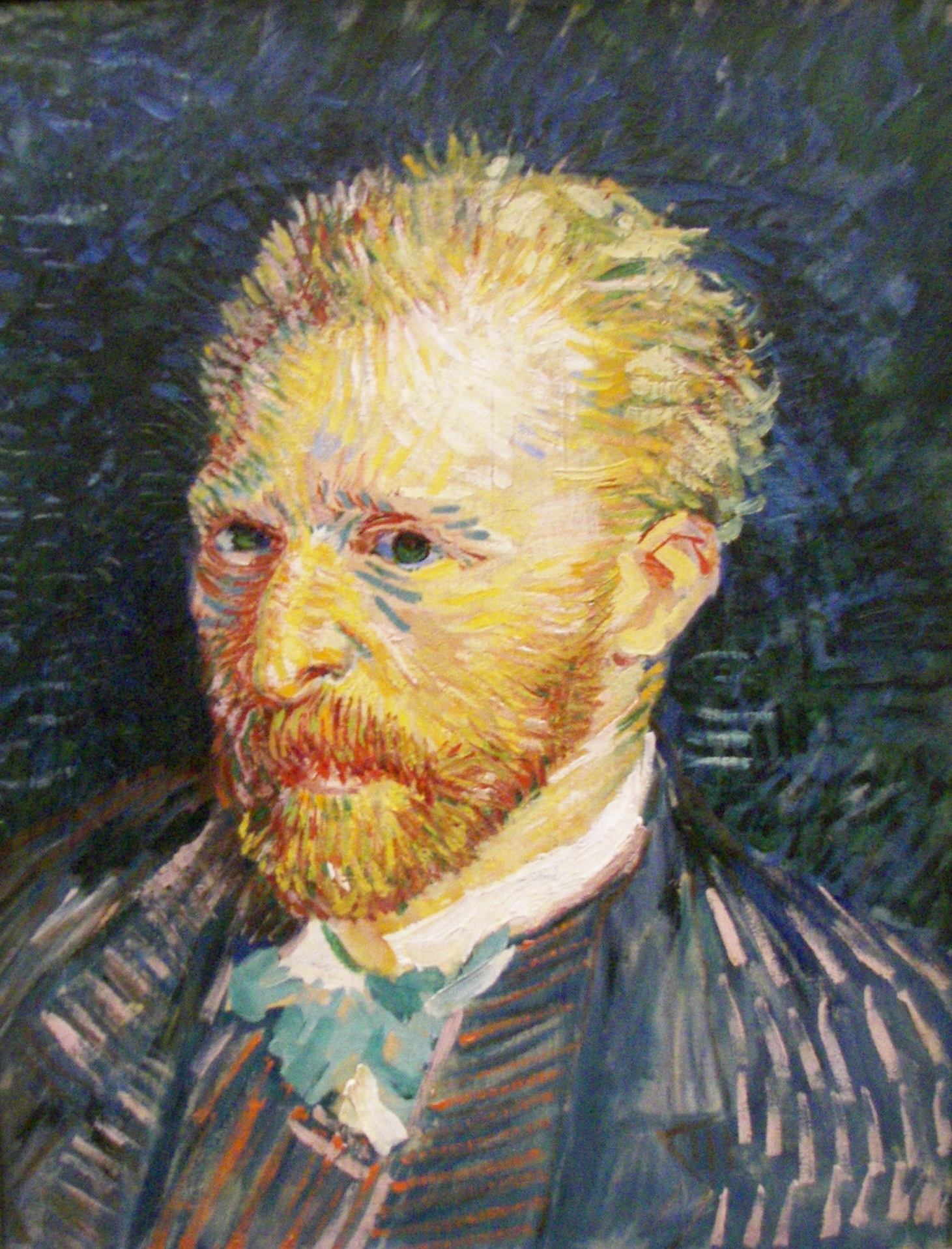
Self-Portrait, Autumn 1887
Oil on canvas, 47 × 35 cm
Musée d'Orsay, Paris (F320)

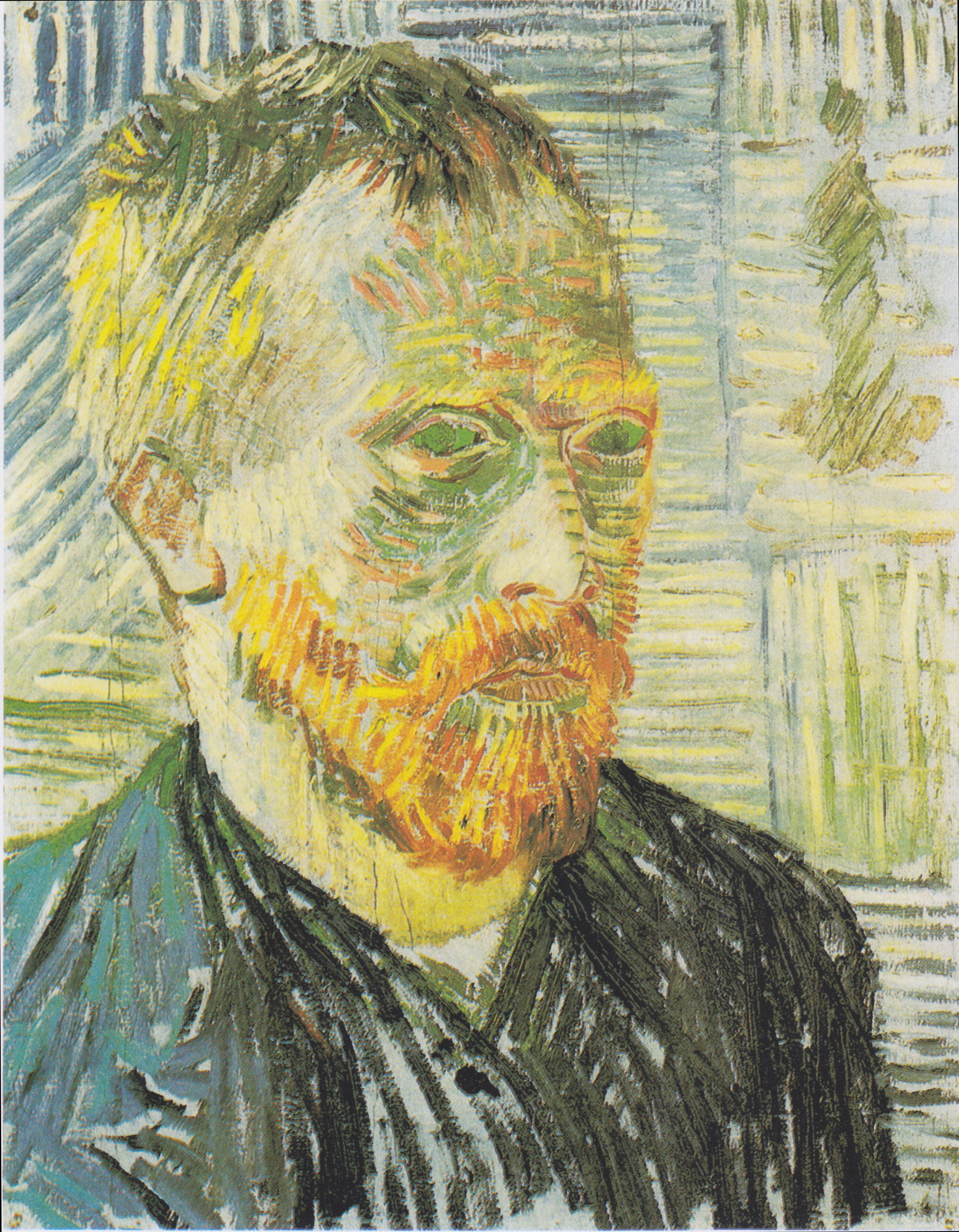
Self-Portrait with Japanese print December, 1887
Kunstmuseum, Basel (on loan from Emily Dreyfus Foundation) (F319)

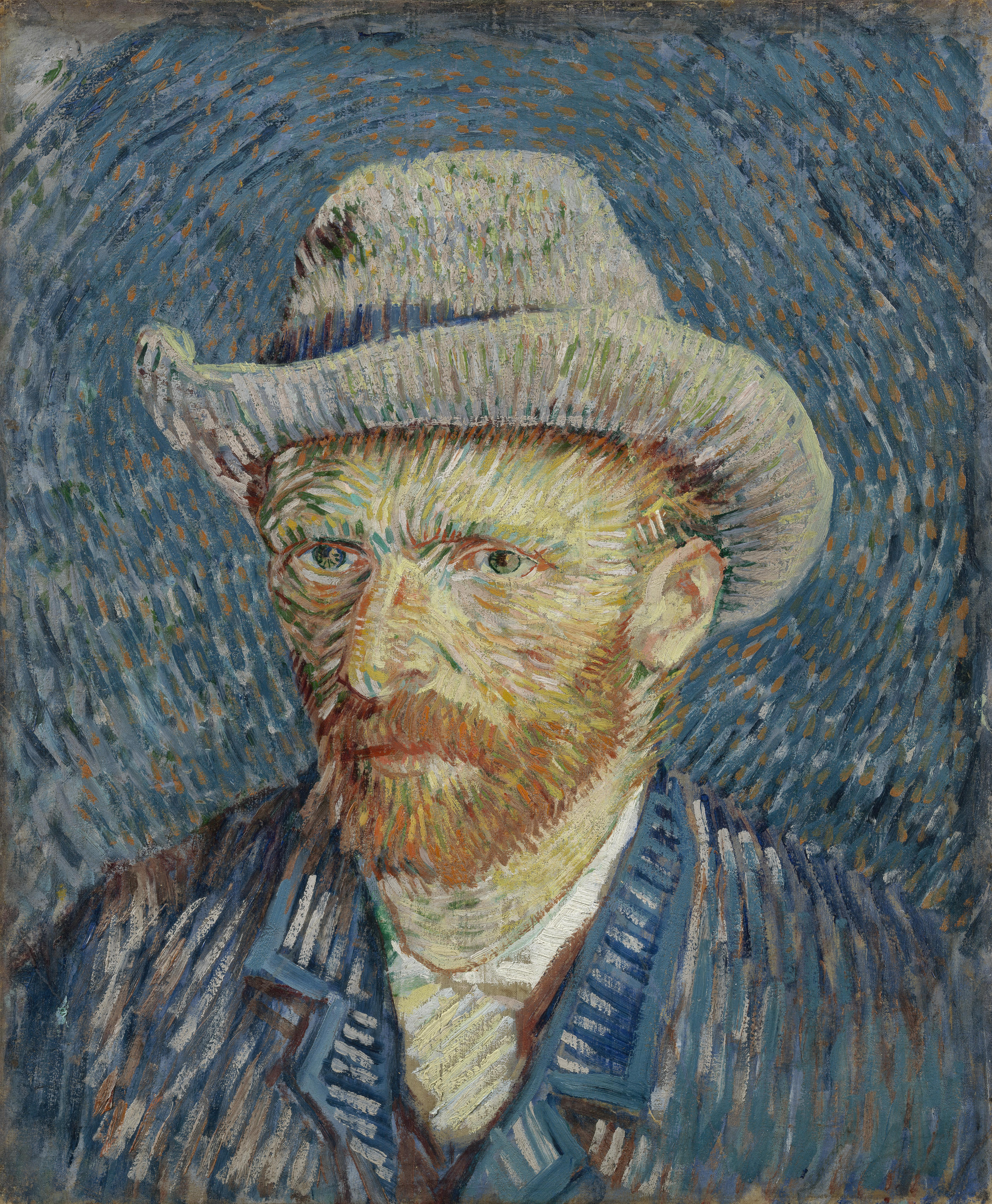
Self-Portrait with Grey Felt Hat, Winter 1887/88
Oil on canvas, 44 × 37.5 cm
Van Gogh Museum, Amsterdam (F344)

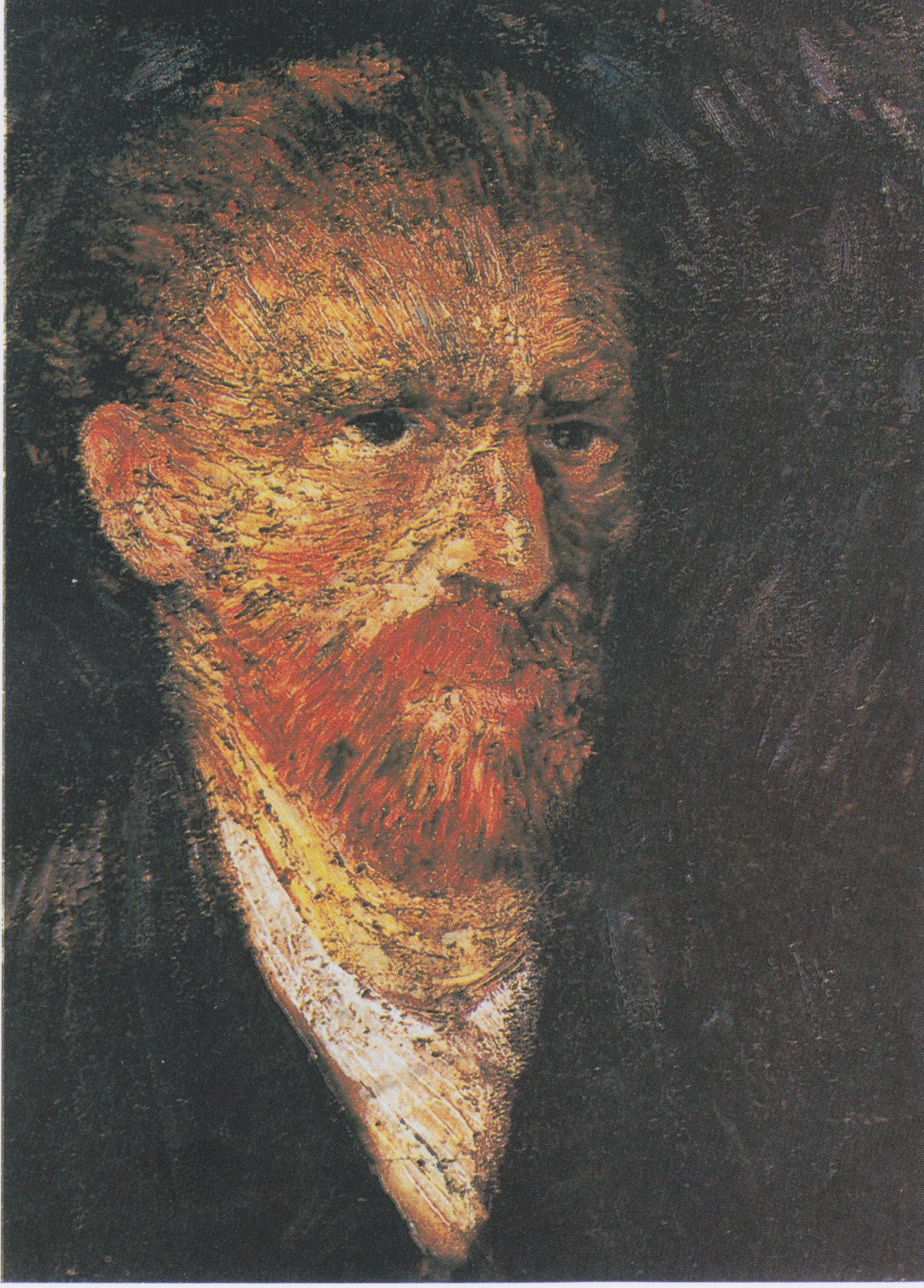
Self-Portrait, 1887–88, (F1672a)

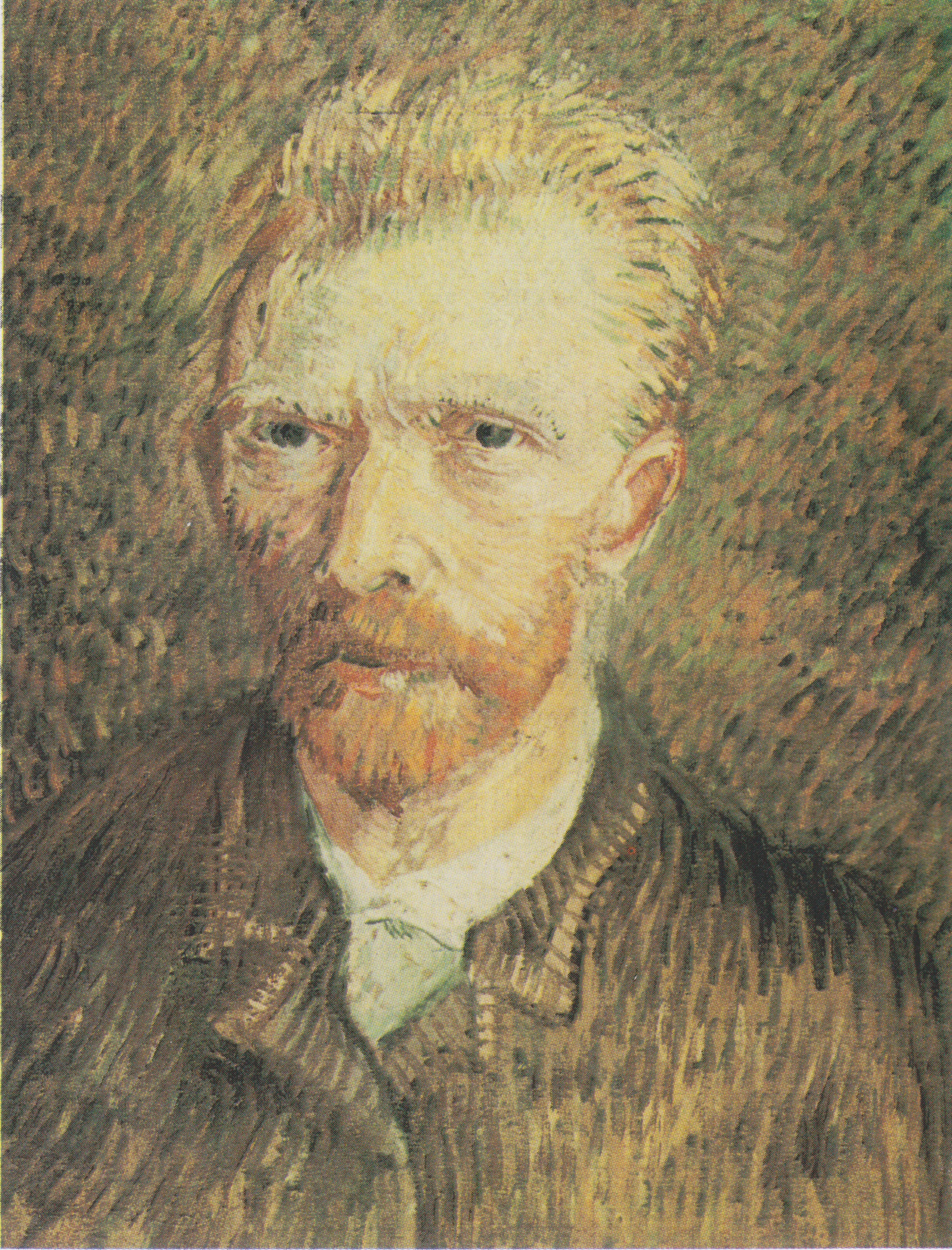
Self-Portrait, 1887–88
Foundation E.G. Bührle Collection, Zürich (F366)

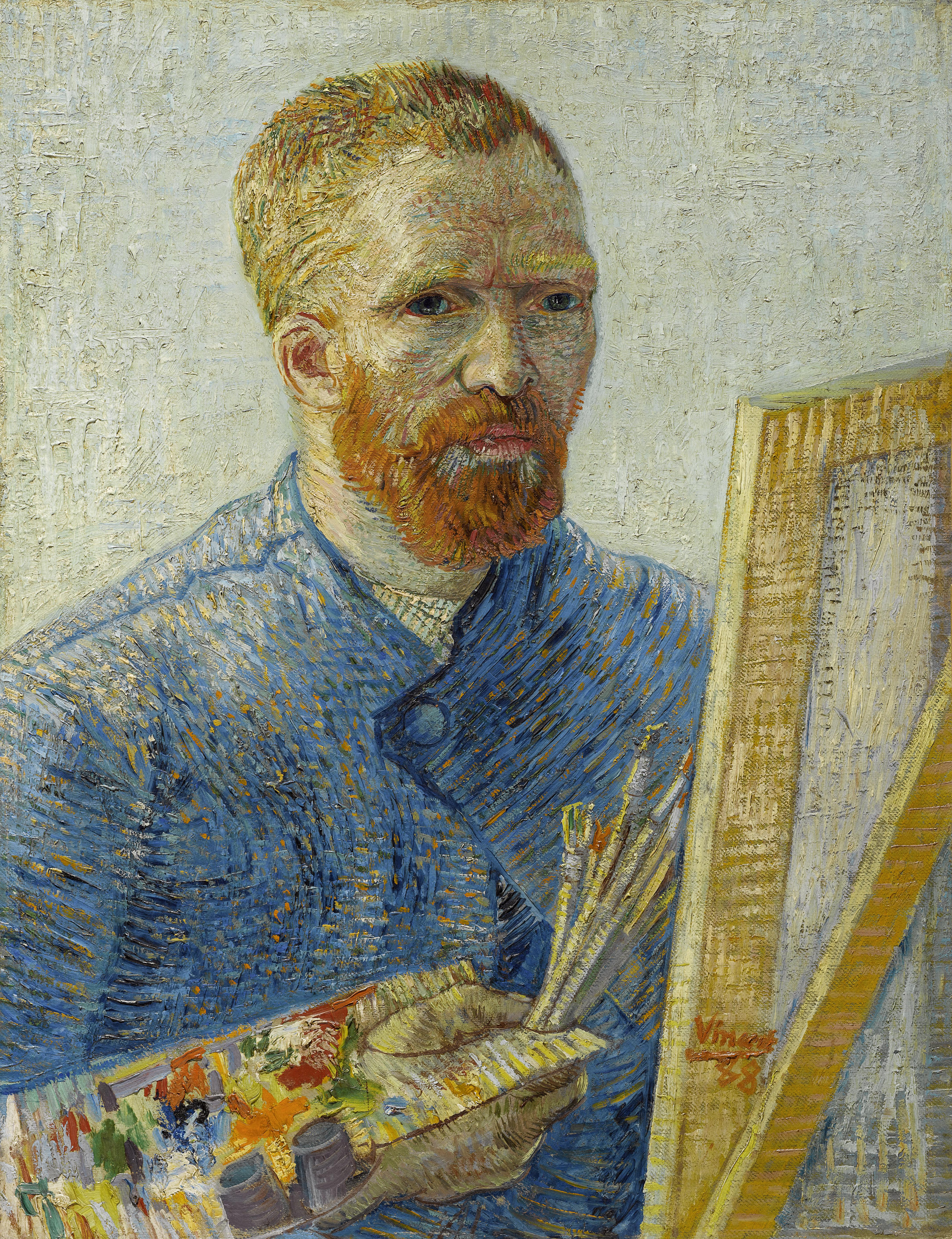
Self-Portrait as a Painter, December 1887 – February 1888, Oil on canvas, 65.1 cm × 50 cm
Van Gogh Museum, Amsterdam (F522)

=== Arles ===
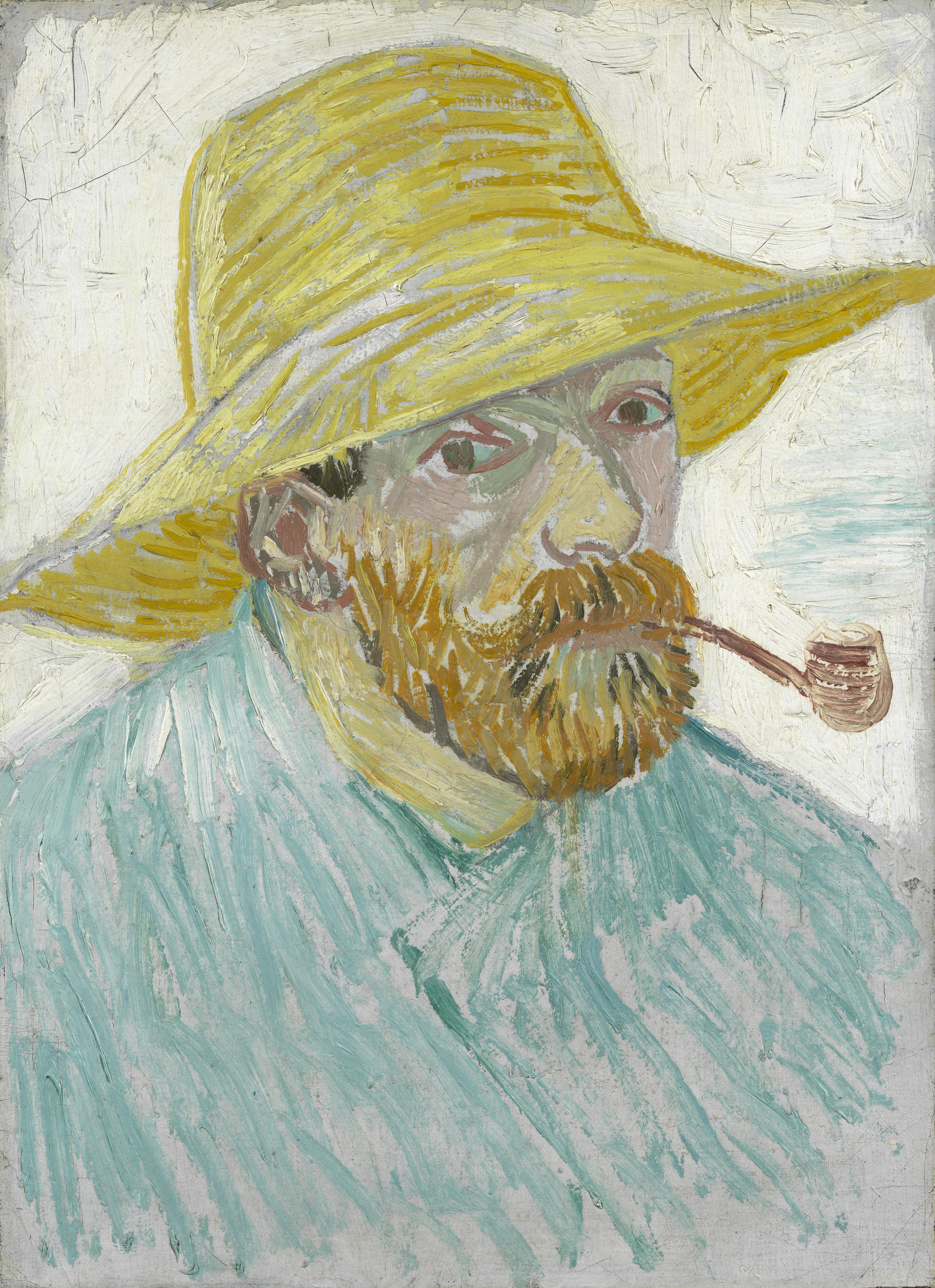
Self-Portrait with Pipe and Straw Hat, Summer 1888
Oil on pasteboard, 42 × 31 cm
Van Gogh Museum, Amsterdam (F524)

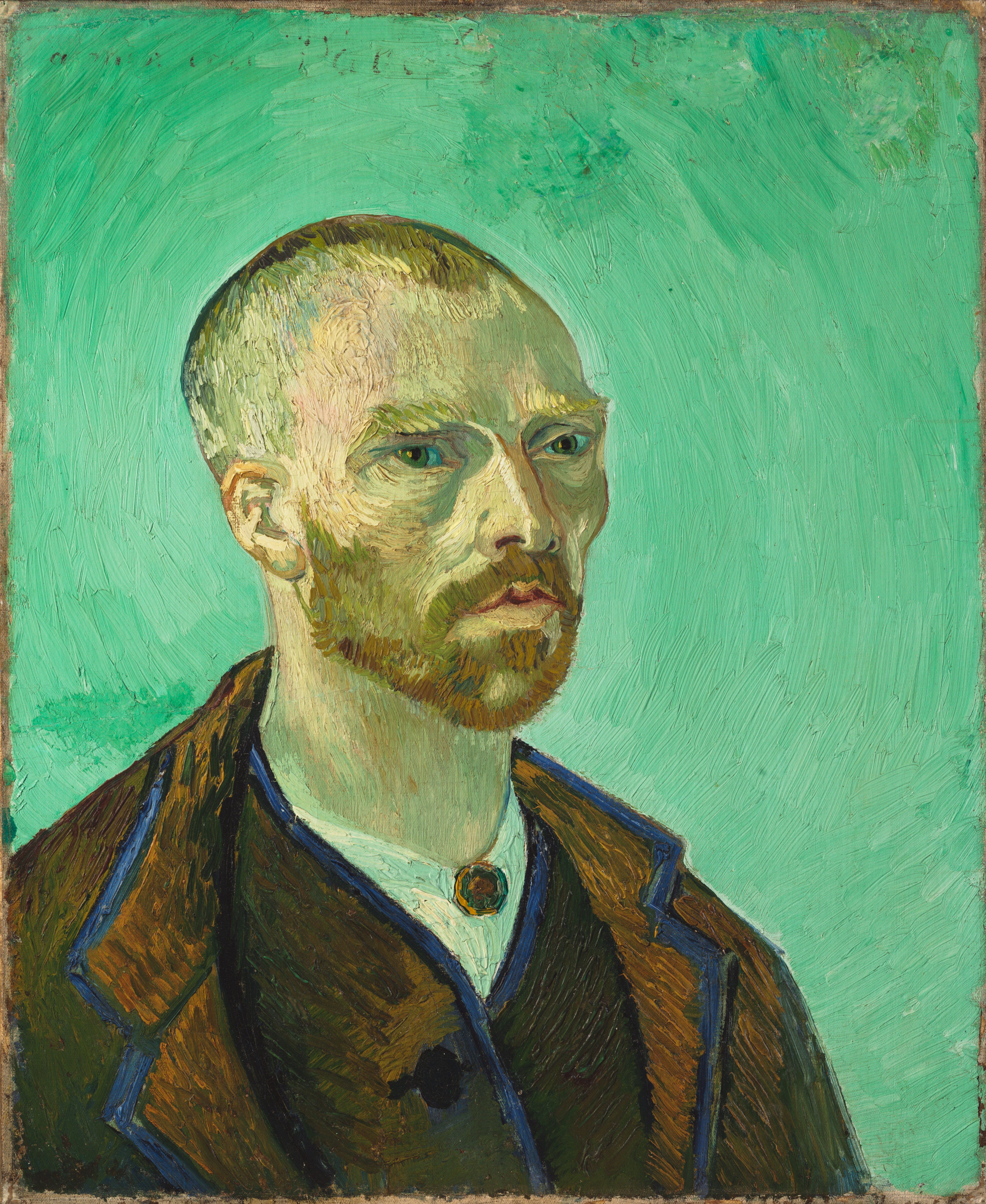
Self-portrait dedicated to Paul Gauguin, September 1888
Oil on canvas, 62 × 52 cm
Fogg Art Museum, Cambridge, MA (F476 – see Provenances below)

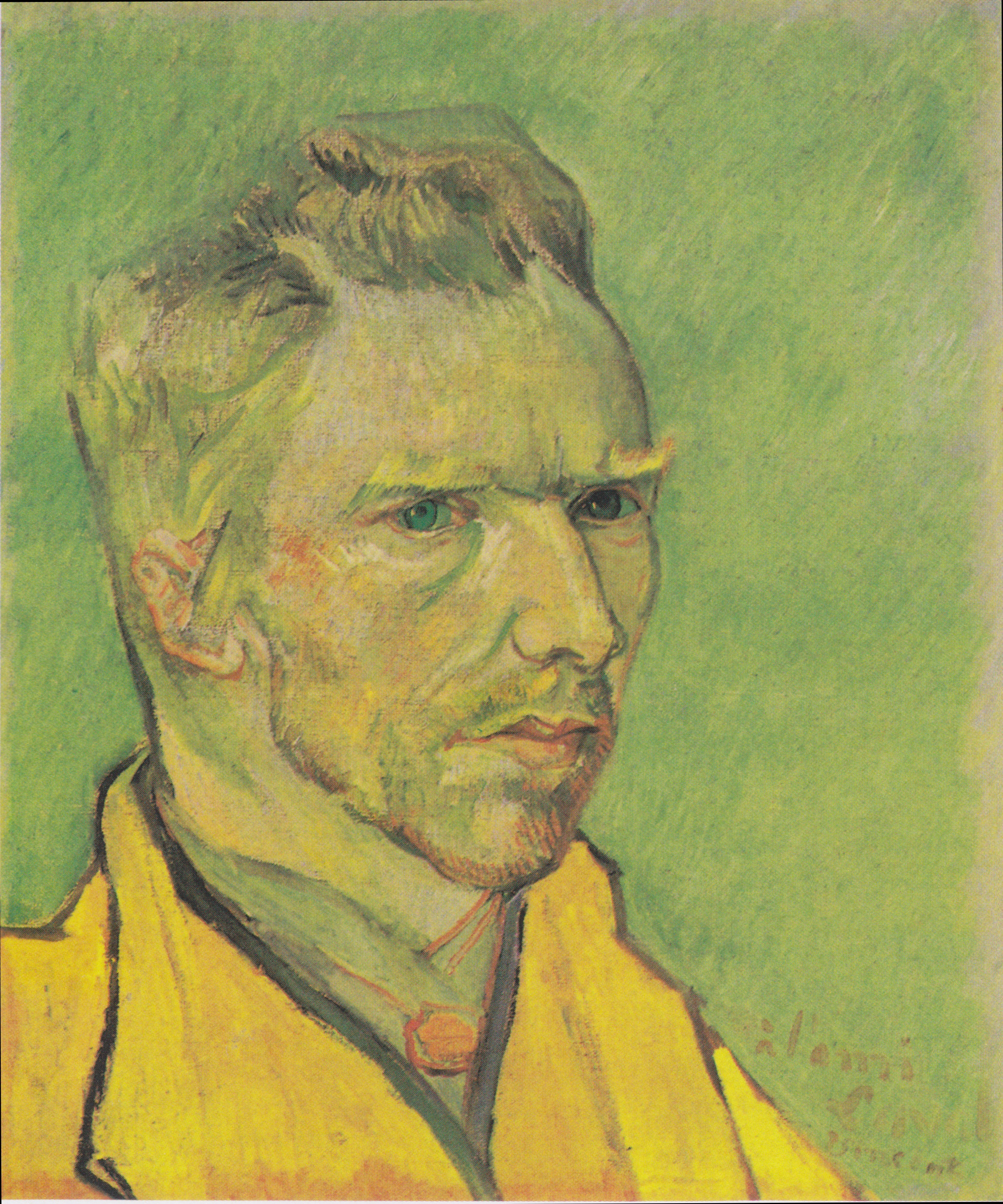
Self-portrait dedicated to Charles Laval, Arles, November/December 1888
Private collection (F501)

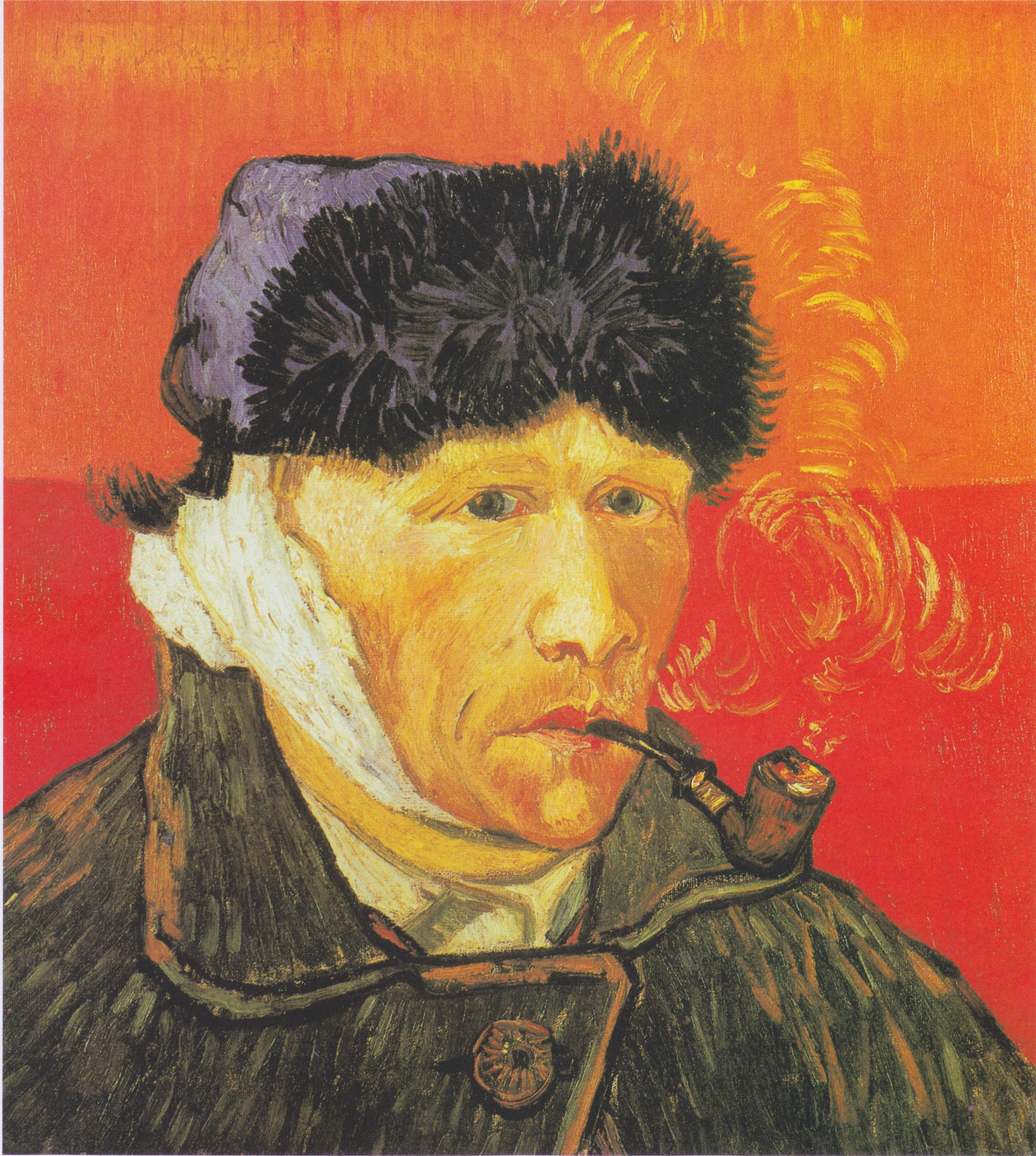
Self-portrait with Bandaged Ear and Pipe, January 1889
Oil on canvas, 51 × 45 cm
Private Collection (F529)

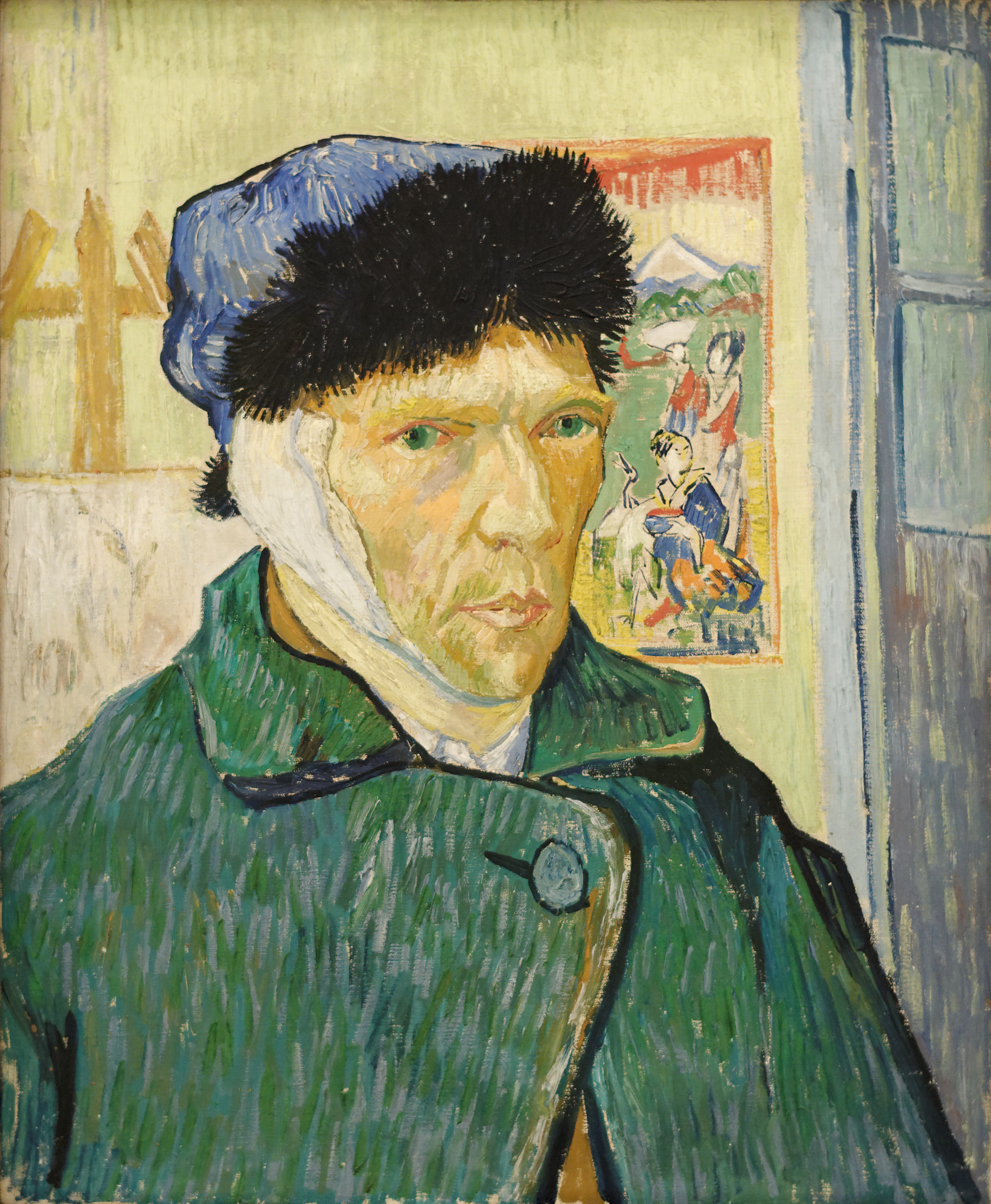
Self-portrait with Bandaged Ear, Easel and Japanese Print, January 1889
Oil on canvas, 60 × 49 cm
Courtauld Institute Galleries, London (F527)

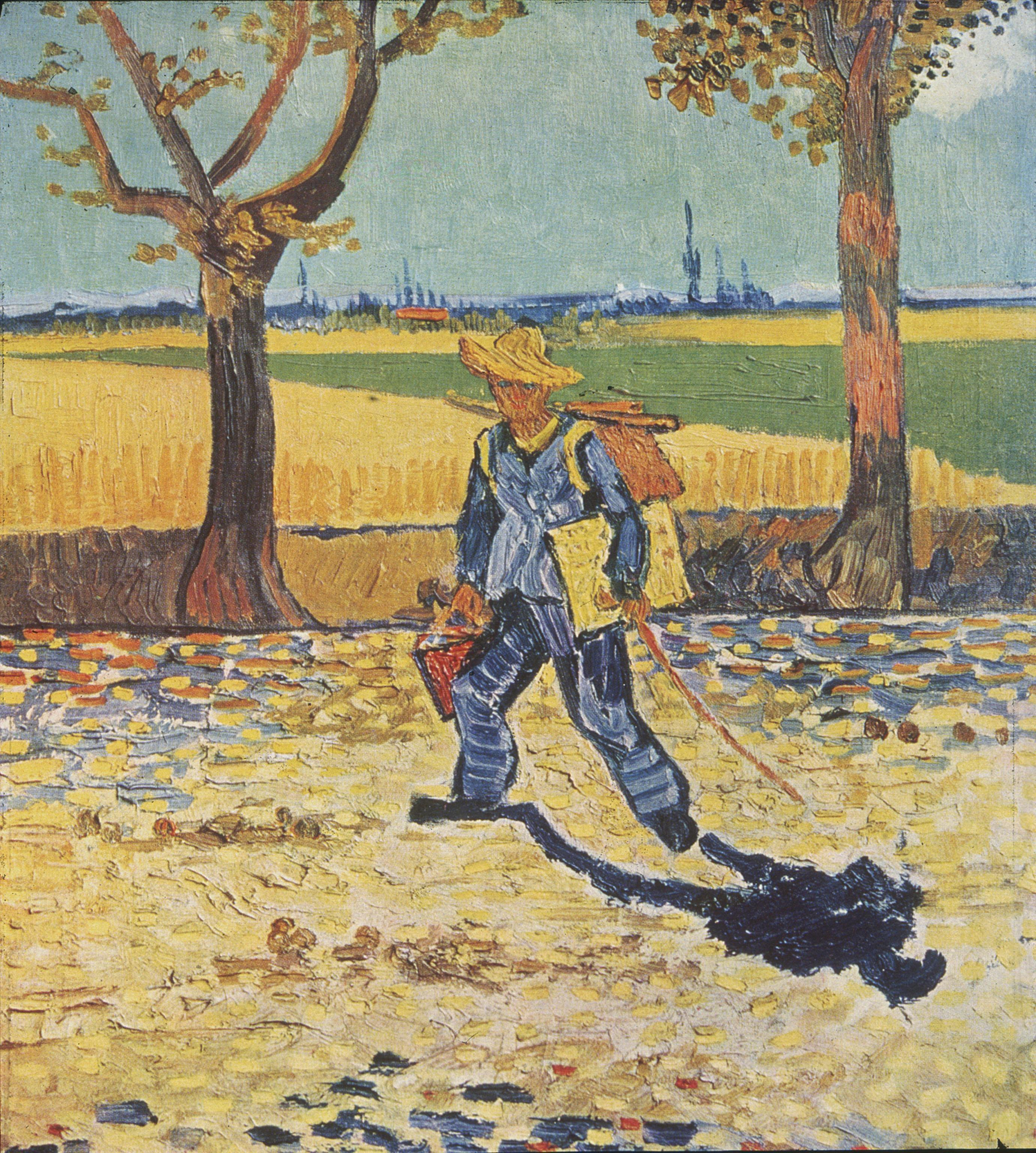
Painter on his way to work: Vincent van Gogh on the road to Montmajour, August 1888 (F448), Oil on canvas, 48 × 44 cm, believed to have been destroyed by fire in World War II

=== Saint-Rémy ===
All the self-portraits executed in Saint-Rémy show the artist's head from the left, i.e. the side with non-mutilated ear.

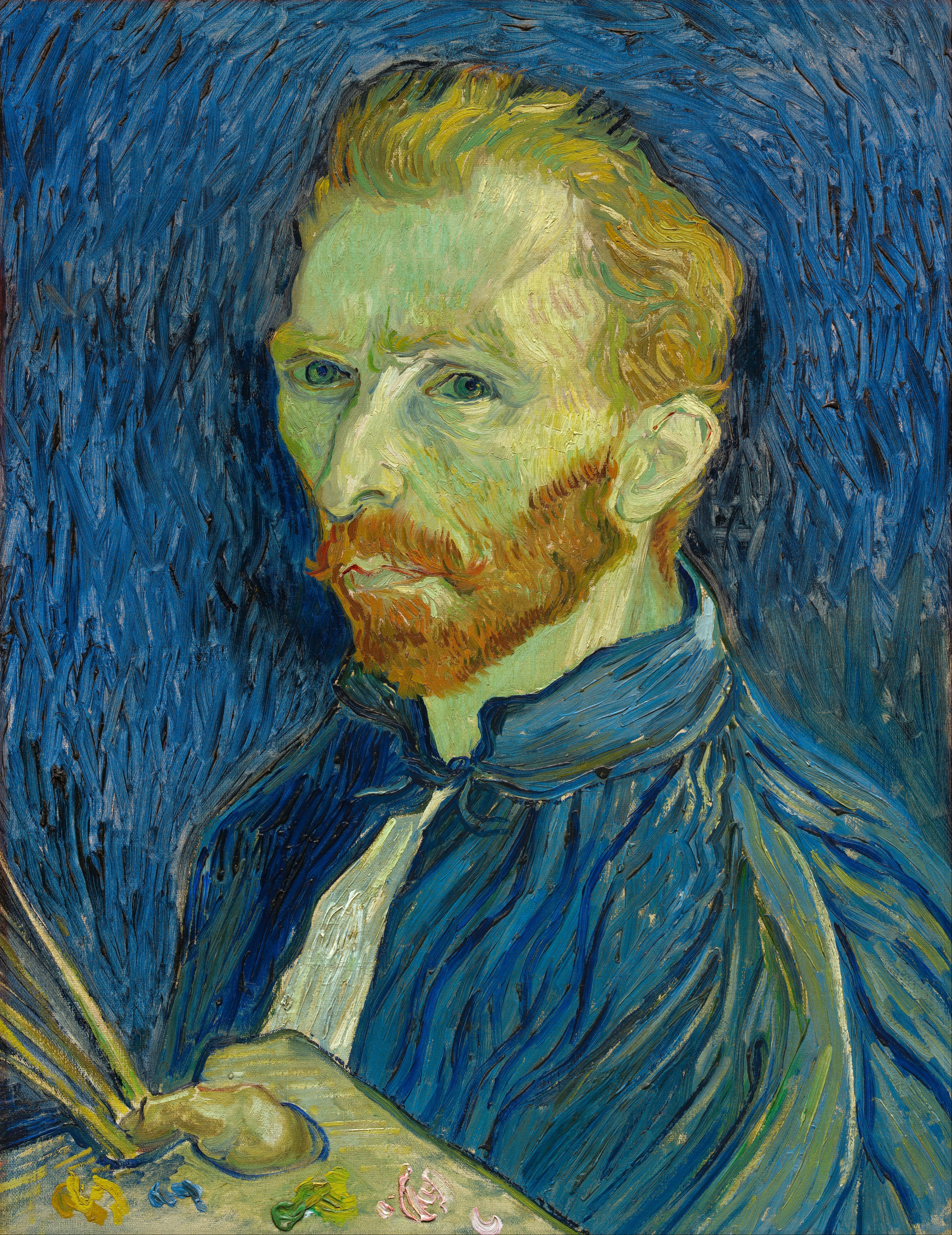
Self-Portrait, August 1889
Oil on canvas, 57 × 43,5 cm
National Gallery of Art, Washington D.C. (F626, JH1770)

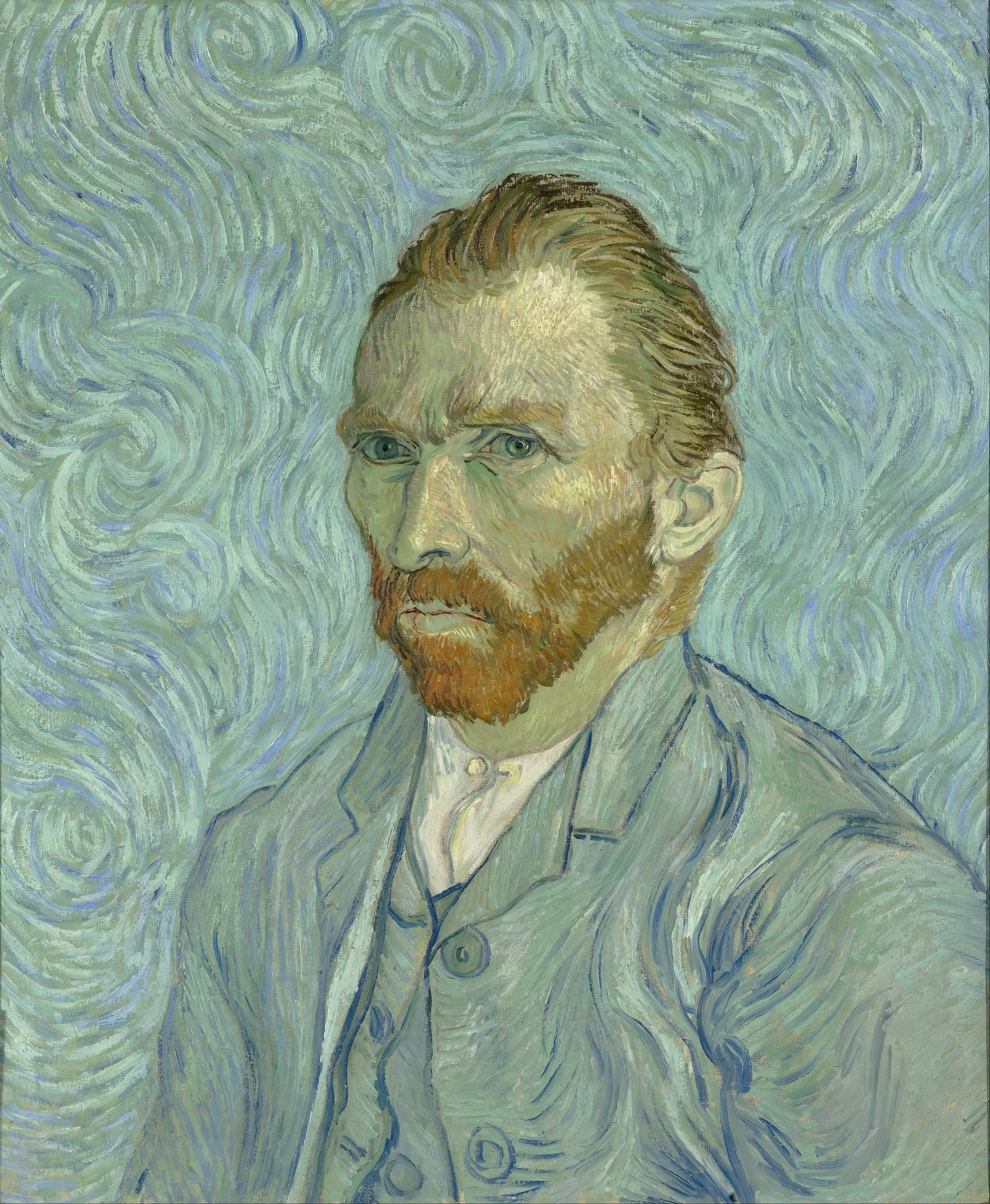
Self-portrait, September 1889
Oil on canvas, 65 × 54 cm
Musée d'Orsay, Paris. This may have been Van Gogh's last self-portrait. (F627 – see Remarks below)

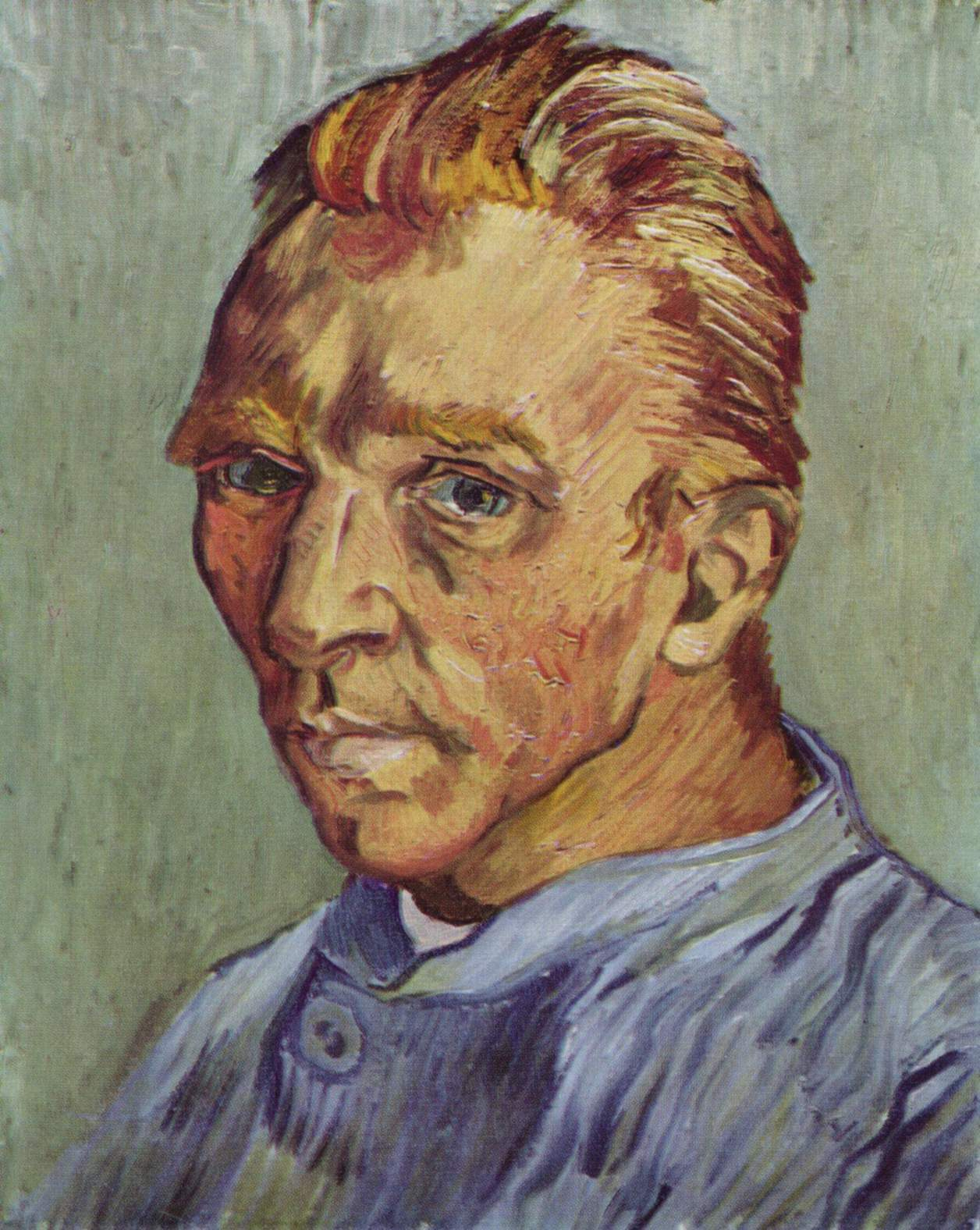
Self-portrait without beard, end September 1889
Oil on canvas, 40 × 31 cm
Private collection. Another contender for being Van Gogh's last self-portrait (F525 – see Remarks below).

=== Auvers-sur-Oise ===
No self-portraits were executed by van Gogh in Auvers-sur-Oise, during the final weeks of his life.

== Remarks ==
- F208a: Self-Portrait with Dark Felt Hat is amongst the earliest of van Gogh's self-portraits. It was discovered late in the family collection and was not exhibited before 1945. Opinions differ about the date and place of its execution. De la Faille thought it painted in Antwerp before 1886, while Hulsker thought it painted in Paris in spring 1886. Hendriks and Tilborgh opt for autumn 1886, based on its resemblance to van Gogh's work that winter when he began to embrace Neo-impressionism. X-ray analysis reveals a nude figure study below. Since students did not work from nude models at Antwerp, this places the painting as executed in Paris where van Gogh had enrolled in Fernand Cormon's atelier. There is no other work in van Gogh's oeuvre which complements this portrait, which has led to some authors such as Dorn questioning its authenticity. However Hendriks and Tilborgh are satisfied that the painting is consistent with others executed at the beginning and end of van Gogh's first year in Paris. Marc Edo Tralbaut, van Gogh's principal biographer, especially valorised the portrait, selecting it for the dust-jacket of his biography and stating that van Gogh had "laid himself bare" for the portrait. Tralbaut notes that van Gogh painted a number of self-portraits at this time, possibly because of his difficulty in getting models to sit for him. He was in poor health and his teeth were falling out, prompting him to grow a moustache to conceal them. At this time he was wearing city-clothes in an effort to stress his middle-class background as he strove to establish a conventional career for himself as an artist.
- F627: This painting may have been van Gogh's last self-portrait, which he gave to his brother.
- F525: This painting may have been van Gogh's last self-portrait, which he gave to his mother as a birthday gift. Van Gogh painted Self-Portrait without beard just after he had shaved himself (Hulsker thought it painted in Arles following his admission to hospital after mutilating his ear when he was also shaved, as can be seen in the "bandaged ear" portraits F527 and F529). The painting can be seen in the third (smaller) version of Bedroom in Arles at the Musée d'Orsay. The self-portrait is one of the most expensive paintings of all time, selling for $71.5 million in 1998 in New York. At the time, it was the third (or an inflation-adjusted fourth) most expensive painting ever sold.

== Provenances ==
- F476: Vincent van Gogh, Arles, (1888) gift; to Paul Gauguin, (1888–1897) sold. [Ambroise Vollard, Paris.] [Paul Cassirer Gallery, Berlin.] Hugo von Tschudi, Berlin, (1906–1911), by descent; to his widow, Angela von Tschudi, Munich (1911–1919), to Neue Staatsgalerie, Munich, (1919–1939); removed from the collection by the National Socialist (Nazi) authorities in 1938, (EK16554) consigned; to [Galerie Fischer, Lucerne, Switzerland, sale: Gemälde und Plastiken Moderner Meister aus Deutschen Museen, 30 June 1939, no. 45]; to Maurice Wertheim (1939–1951) bequest; to Fogg Art Museum, 1951. Notes: Gauguin sold the painting for Fr 300, Hugo von Tschudi bought the painting for the Nationalgalerie, Berlin, with funds from sponsors, but did not submit it to the Kaiser for pre-approval. He took the painting to Munich when he assumed post there.

== Scandals ==
In Nazi Germany, Vincent van Gogh's works were among those labelled generally "degenerate art". Several works were seized and sold/or destroyed by Nazi authorities including the self-portrait dedicated to Paul Gauguin, September 1888, which was seized from the Neue Staatsgalerie in Munich, part of the Bavarian State Paintings Collections, to be sold at auction in 1939 in Lucerne, Switzerland, while other works by van Gogh could remain in this collection, but were kept under lock and key.

== Fakes ==
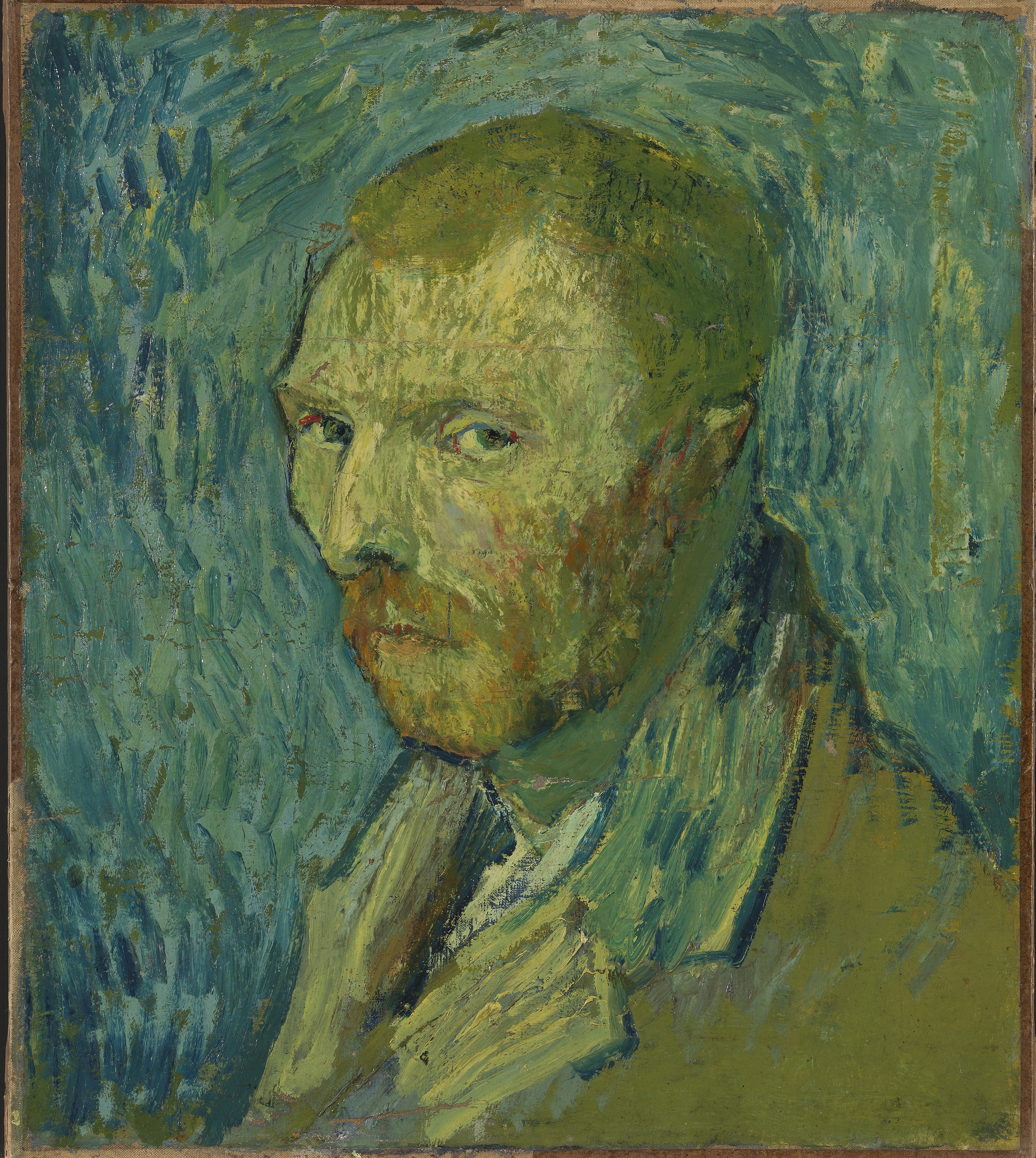
Self-portrait, à l'oreille mutilée, 1889? (F528) Oil on canvas, 40 × 31 cm National Museum, Oslo

Almost at the same time as when his Catalogue raisonné was published, Jacob Baart de la Faille had to admit that he had included paintings emerging from dubious sources, and of dubious quality. Shortly after, in 1930, De la Faille rejected some thirty-odd paintings, which he had originally included in his catalogue – together with a hundred of others he had already excluded: Self-portraits – and Sunflowers – held a prominent place in the set he now rejected. In 1970, the editors of De la Faille's posthumous manuscript brand marked most of these dubious Self-portraits as forgeries, but could not settle all disputes, at least on one:

- The Self-portrait 'a l'éstampe japonais', then in the collection of William Goetz, Los Angeles, was included, though all editors refused its authenticity.

Meanwhile, the authenticity of a second "self-portrait" has been challenged:

- The Self-portrait, 'à l'oreille mutilée', acquired in 1910 for the Nasjonalgalleriet, Oslo, had been unanimously rejected by scholars and technical researchers for decades, until provenance research by staff members reported pro domo the contrary. On January 20, 2020, the results of research into this painting were published, and the conclusion was that this is a real Van Gogh painting, painted in the time that he was in a mental institution.

Note the painter shows his right ear, if painted via a mirror, while Van Gogh cut his left ear.

== Portraits of Vincent van Gogh by other artists ==
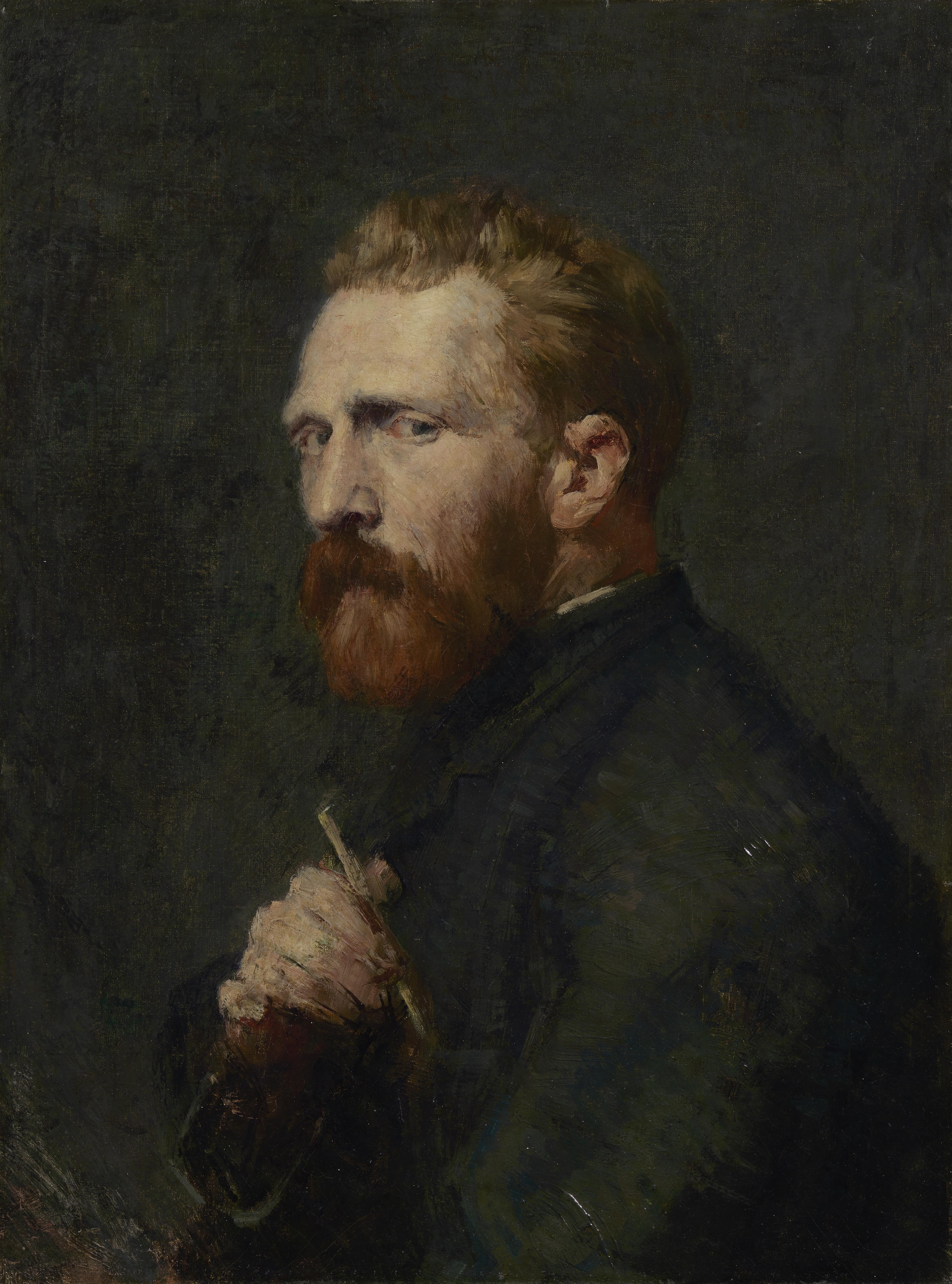
John Russell, Vincent van Gogh, 1886, Van Gogh Museum, Amsterdam

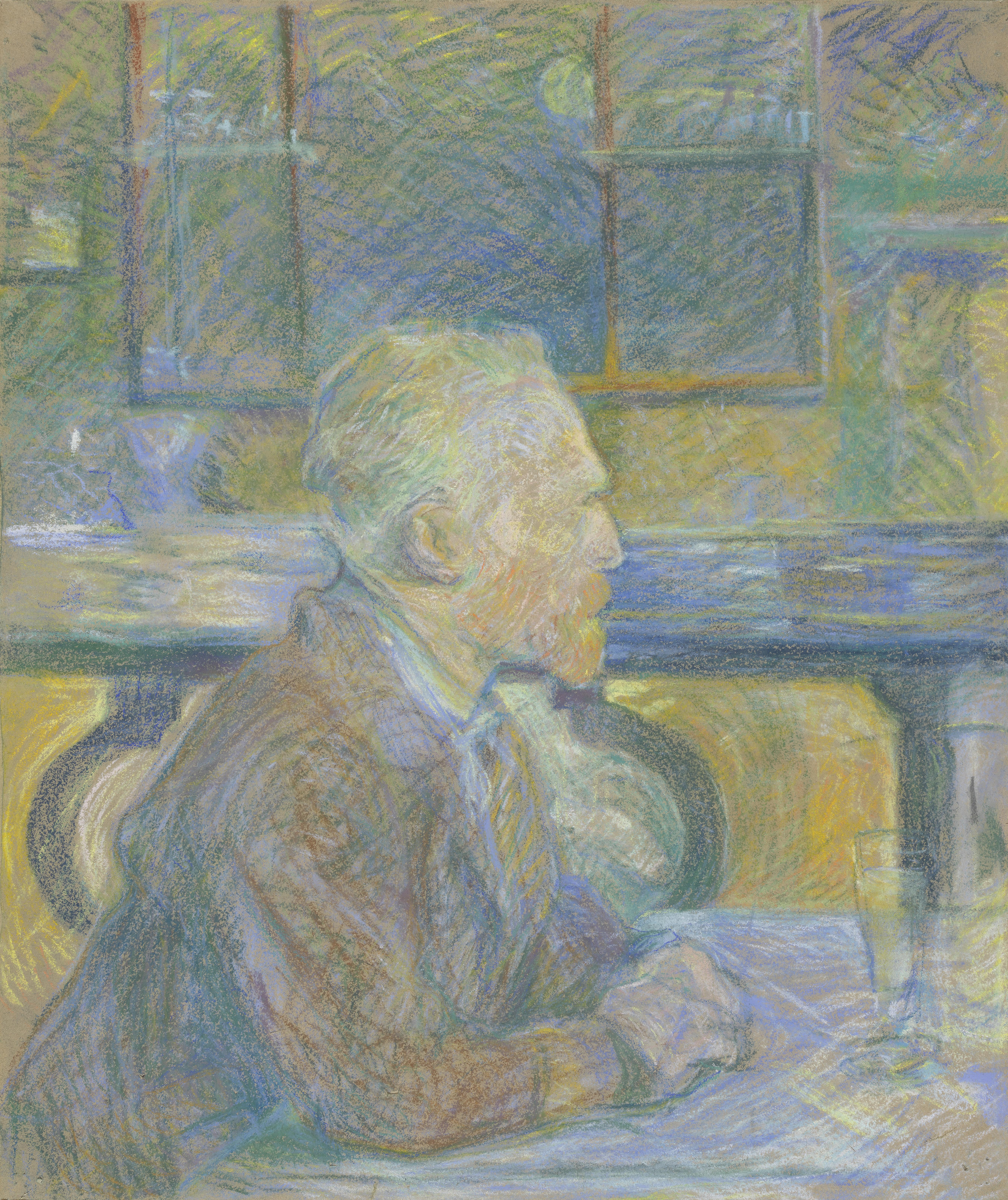
Henri de Toulouse-Lautrec, Portrait of Vincent van Gogh, 1887, pastel on cardboard, Van Gogh Museum, Amsterdam

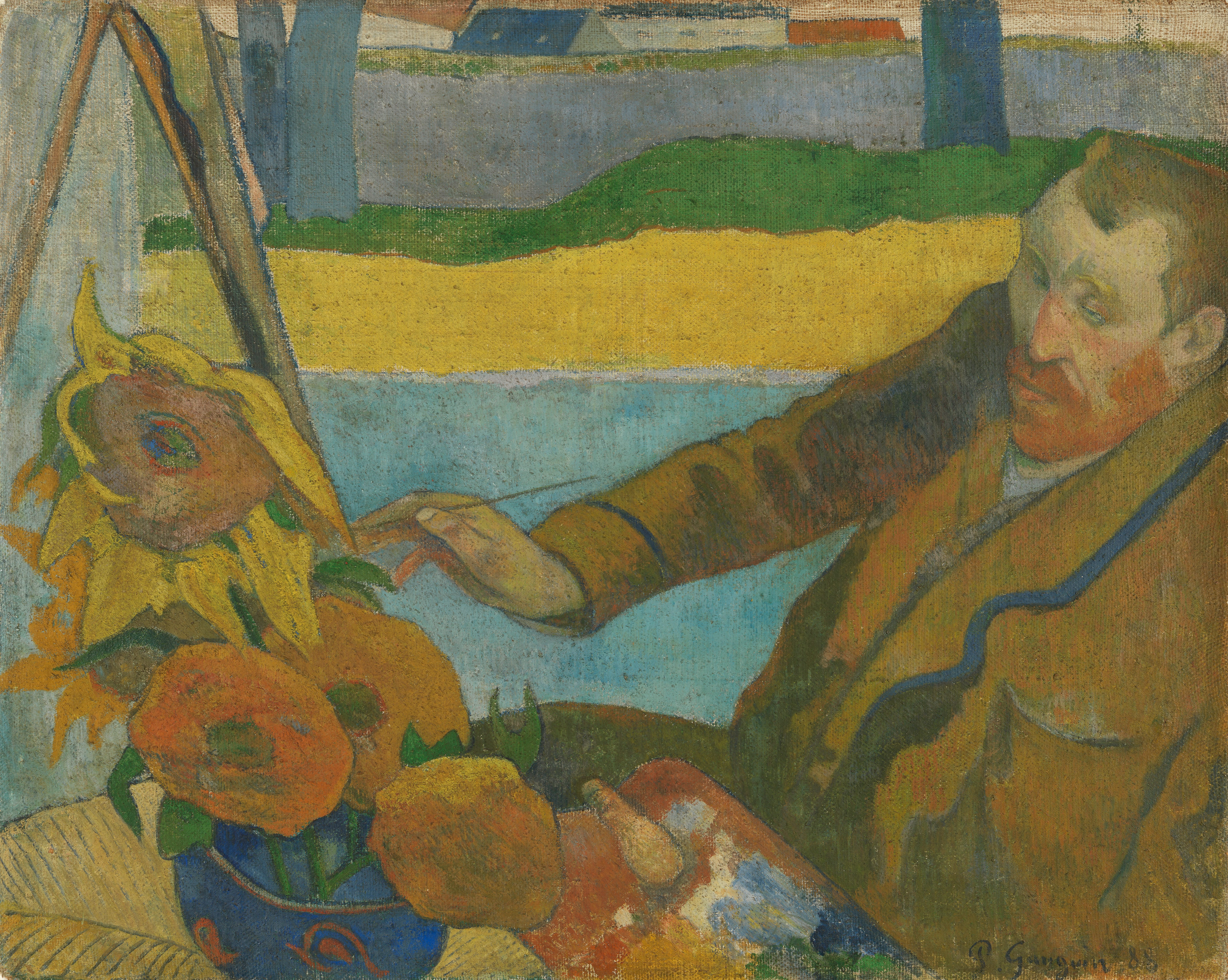
Paul Gauguin, The Painter of Sunflowers, 1888, Van Gogh Museum, Amsterdam

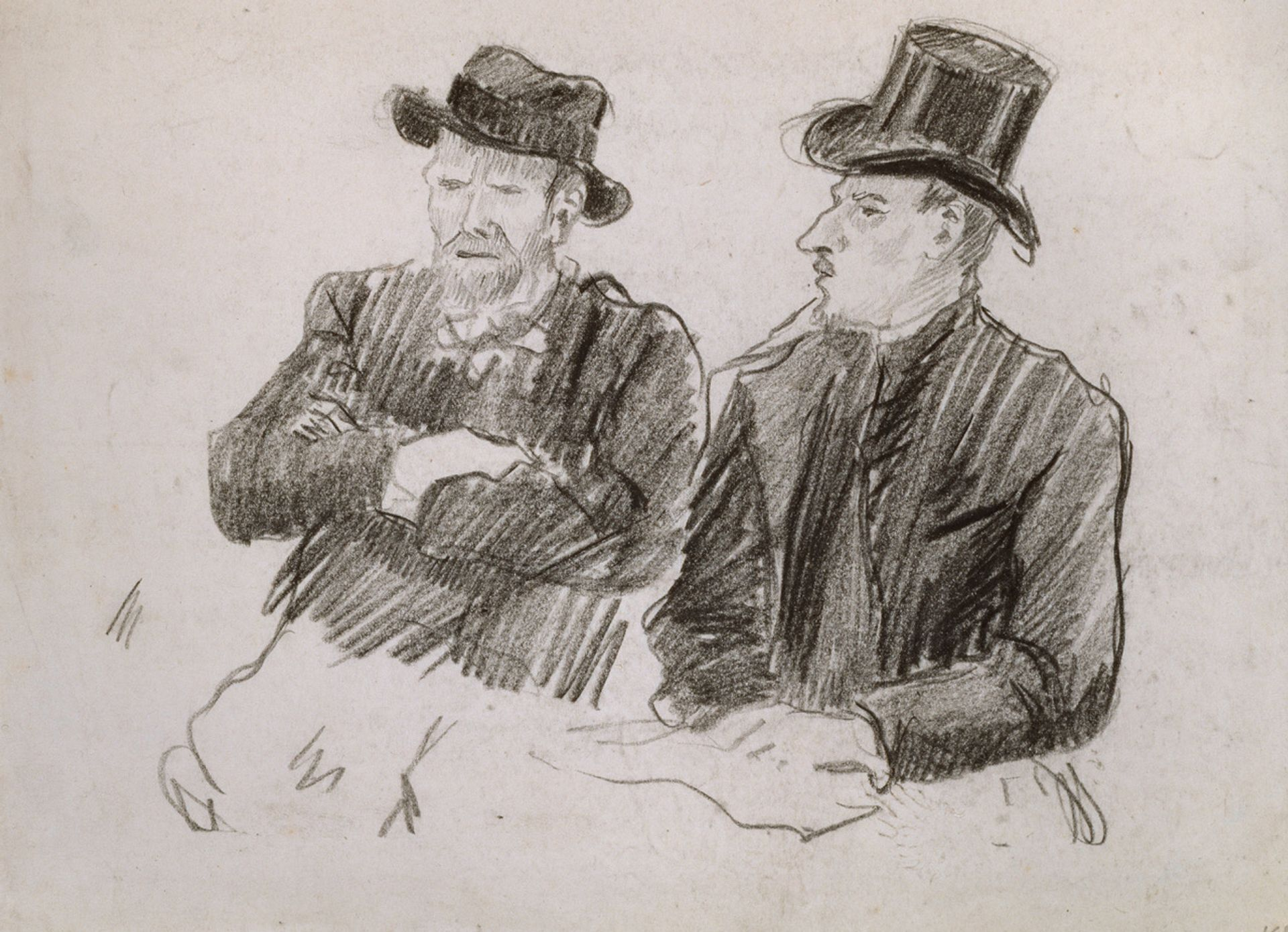
Lucien Pissarro, Vincent and Theo van Gogh in Conversation, 1887, drawing of Vincent with his brother Theo van Gogh.

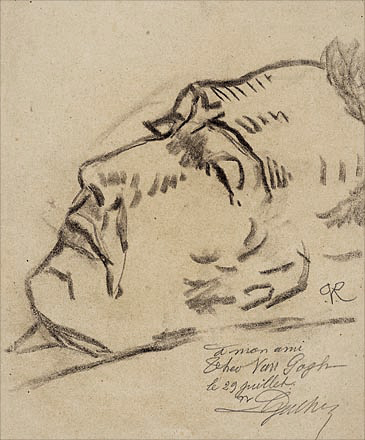
Paul Gachet, Van Gogh on his Deathbed, 1890, drawing of van Gogh in his death bed after committing suicide.

== Photographs ==
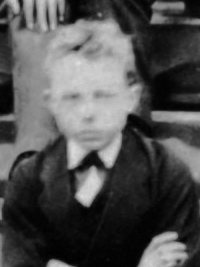
Photograph of Vincent van Gogh, age 13, 1866

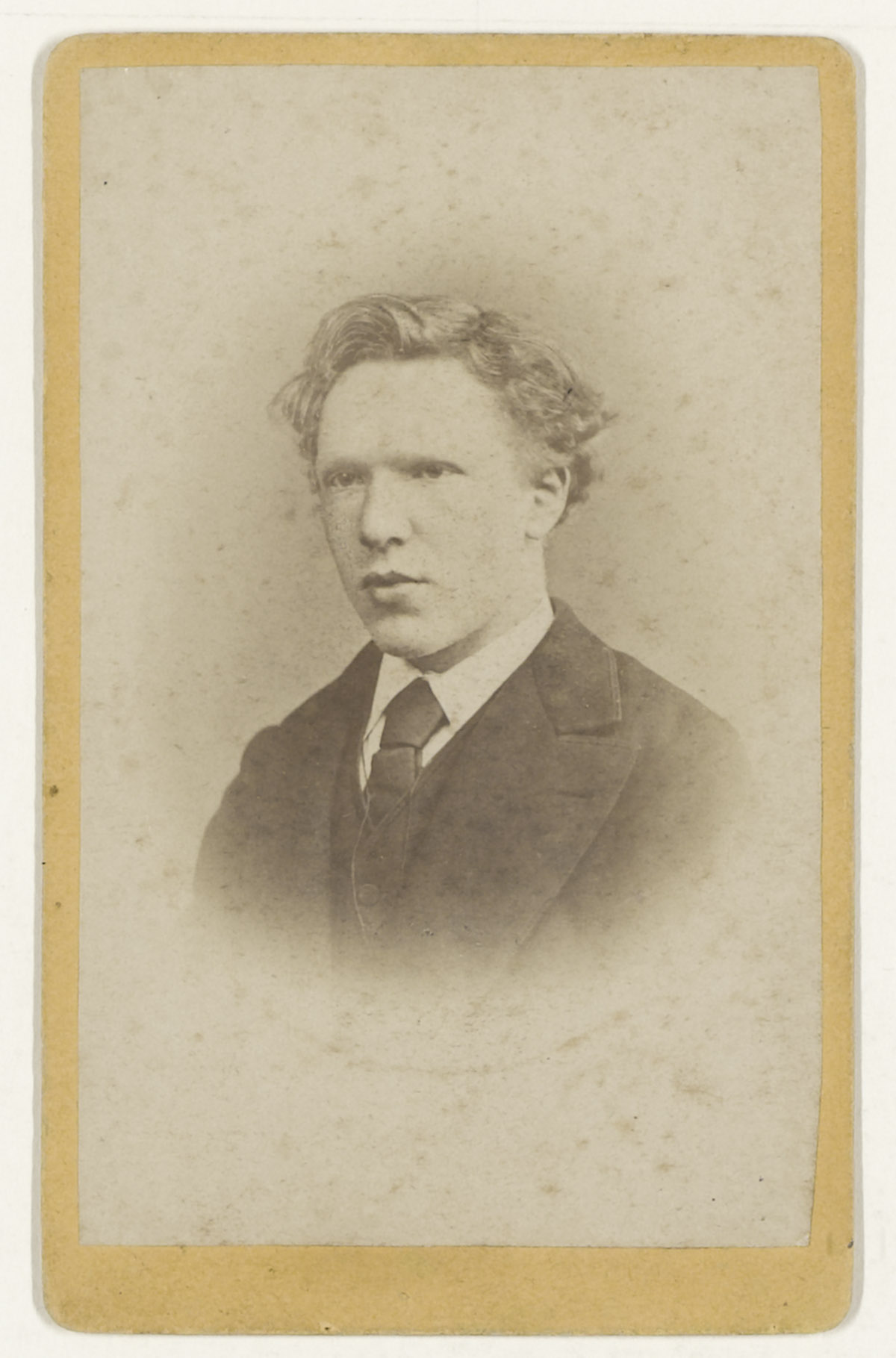
Photograph of Vincent van Gogh, age 19, c. 1873

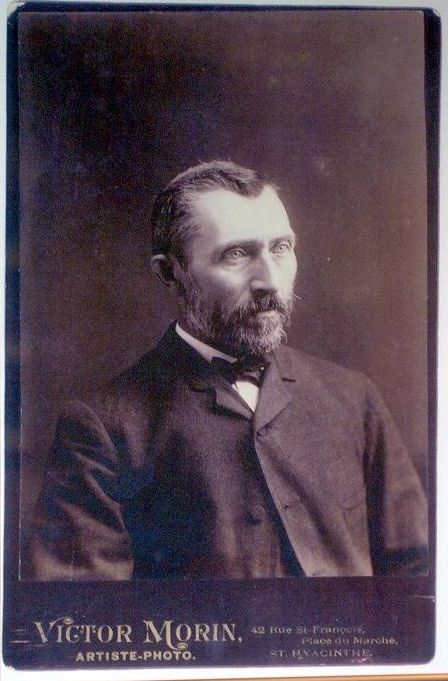
Photo by Victor Morin, c. 1886, Quebec. Discovered in the early 1990s, a disputed, unconfirmed photograph of Vincent.

== See also ==
- List of works by Vincent van Gogh

== Sources ==
=== References ===
- Dorn, Roland: Vincent, portraitiste: Bemerkungen zu ein paar heissen Eisen, in: Lukas Gloor, ed.: Van Gogh echt falsch: Zwei Selbstbildnisse der Sammlung Emil Bührle, Zürich 2005, pp. 7 – 21
- Hammacher, A. M.: Van Gogh: Selbstbildnisse, Philipp Reclam jun., Stuttgart 1960; 2nd edition 1970
- Hendriks, Ella; van Tilborgh, Louis. Vincent Van Gogh Paintings: 2, Lund Humphries 2011, ISBN 978-1848220836
- Van Lindert, Juleke, & Van Uitert, Evert: Een eigentijdse expressie: Vincent van Gogh en zijn portretten, Meulenhoff/Landshoff, Amsterdam 1990 ISBN 90-290-8350-6
- Pickvance, Ronald. Van Gogh In Saint-Rémy and Auvers (exh. cat. Metropolitan Museum of Art, New York: Abrams, 1986. ISBN 0-87099-477-8
- Tralbaut, Marc Edo. Vincent van Gogh, London 1961, Macmillan, ISBN 033-3109104
- Walther, Ingo (2000). Van Gogh. Cologne: Taschen. ISBN 978-3-8228-6322-0.
