= Outline of bridges =

Overview of and topical guide to bridges

The following outline is provided as an overview of and topical guide to bridges:

Bridges – a structure built to span physical obstacles without closing the way underneath such as a body of water, valley, or road, for the purpose of providing passage over the obstacle.

== What type of thing is a bridge? ==
Bridges can be described as all of the following:

- A structure – An arrangement and organization of interrelated elements in a material object or system, or the object or system so organized.
- A thoroughfare – A road connecting one location to another.

== Types of bridges ==
- Beam Bridge
- Truss Bridge
  - Truss arch bridge
- Cantilever Bridge
- Stressed ribbon bridge
- Arch Bridge
  - Tied Arch Bridge
  - Through arch bridge
  - Skew arch
- Suspension Bridge
  - Cable-stayed bridge
- Simple suspension bridge
  - Inca rope bridge
- Tubular bridge
- Extradosed bridge
- Moveable Bridge
  - Drawbridge (British English definition) – the bridge deck is hinged on one end
  - Bascule bridge – a drawbridge hinged on pins with a counterweight to facilitate raising; road or rail
    - Rolling bascule bridge – an unhinged drawbridge lifted by the rolling of a large gear segment along a horizontal rack
  - Folding bridge – a drawbridge with multiple sections that collapse together horizontally
  - Curling bridge – a drawbridge with transverse divisions between multiple sections that curl vertically
  - Fan Bridge - a drawbridge with longitudinal divisions between multiple bascule sections that rise to various angles of elevation, forming a fan arrangement.
  - Vertical-lift bridge – the bridge deck is lifted by counterweighted cables mounted on towers; road or rail
  - Table bridge – a lift bridge with the lifting mechanism mounted underneath it
  - Retractable bridge (Thrust bridge) – the bridge deck is retracted to one side
  - Submersible bridge – also called a ducking bridge, the bridge deck is lowered into the water
  - Tilt bridge – the bridge deck, which is curved and pivoted at each end, is lifted at an angle
  - Swing bridge – the bridge deck rotates around a fixed point, usually at the centre, but may resemble a gate in its operation; road or rail
  - Transporter bridge – a structure high above carries a suspended, ferry-like structure
  - Jet bridge – a passenger bridge to an airplane. One end is mobile with height, yaw, and tilt adjustments on the outboard end
  - Guthrie rolling bridge
  - Vlotbrug, a design of retractable floating bridge in the Netherlands
  - Locks are implicitly bridges as well allowing ship traffic to flow when open and at least foot traffic on top when closed
- Rigid-frame bridge
- Side-spar cable-stayed bridge
- Segmental bridge
- Multi-Level Bridges
- Viaduct
- Vierendeel bridge
- Toll bridge
- Footbridge
  - Clapper bridge
  - Moon bridge
  - Step-stone bridge
  - Zig-zag bridge
  - Plank
  - Boardwalk
  - Joist
- Multi-way bridge
  - Three-Way Bridge
  - Four-Way Bridge
  - Five-Way Bridge
- Trestle bridge
  - Coal trestle
- Transporter bridge
- Log bridge
- Packhorse bridge
- Aqueduct

=== Military Bridges ===
- AM 50
- Armoured vehicle-launched bridge
- Bailey bridge
- Callender-Hamilton bridge
- Mabey Logistic Support Bridge
- Medium Girder Bridge
- Pontoon bridge

== History of bridges ==
History of bridges

== General bridges concepts ==
- Bending The behavior of a slender structural element subjected to an external load applied perpendicularly to a longitudinal axis of the element.
- Compression (physics) The application of balanced inward ("pushing") forces to different points on a material or structure, that is, forces with no net sum or torque directed so as to reduce its size in one or more directions.
- Shear stress The component of stress coplanar with a material cross section.
- Span (engineering) The distance between two intermediate supports for a structure.
- Tension (physics) The pulling force transmitted axially by the means of a string, cable, chain, or similar one-dimensional continuous object, or by each end of a rod, truss member, or similar three-dimensional object; tension might also be described as the action-reaction pair of forces acting at each end of said elements.
- Torsion (mechanics) The twisting of an object due to an applied torque.
  - Torque The rate of change of angular momentum of an object.

== Bridges companies ==
- Alabama Department of Transportation (ALDOT)
- Alaska Department of Transportation and Public Facilities (DOT&PF)
- Arizona Department of Transportation (ADOT)
- Arkansas State Highway and Transportation Department (AHTD)
- California Department of Transportation (Caltrans)
- Colorado Department of Transportation (CDOT)
- Connecticut Department of Transportation (CONNDOT)
- Delaware Department of Transportation (DelDOT)
- Florida Department of Transportation (FDOT)
- Georgia Department of Transportation (GDOT)
- Hawaii Department of Transportation (HDOT)
- Idaho Transportation Department (ITD)
- Illinois Department of Transportation (IDOT)
- Indiana Department of Transportation (INDOT)
- Iowa Department of Transportation (Iowa DOT)
- Kansas Department of Transportation (KDOT)
- Kentucky Transportation Cabinet (KYTC)
- Louisiana Department of Transportation and Development (DOTD)
- Maine Department of Transportation (MaineDOT)
- Maryland Department of Transportation (MDOT)
- Massachusetts Department of Transportation (MassDOT)
- Michigan Department of Transportation (MDOT)
- Minnesota Department of Transportation (Mn/DOT)
- Mississippi Department of Transportation (MDOT)
- Missouri Department of Transportation (MoDOT)
- Montana Department of Transportation (MDT)
- Nebraska Department of Transportation (NDOT)
- Nevada Department of Transportation (NDOT)
- New Hampshire Department of Transportation (NHDOT)
- New Jersey Department of Transportation (NJDOT)
- New Mexico Department of Transportation (NMDOT)
- New York
  - New York State Bridge Authority
  - New York State Department of Transportation (NYSDOT)
  - New York State Thruway Authority (NYSTA)
- North Carolina Department of Transportation (NCDOT)
- North Dakota Department of Transportation (NDDOT)
- Ohio Department of Transportation (ODOT)
- Oklahoma Department of Transportation (ODOT)
- Oregon Department of Transportation (ODOT)
- Pennsylvania Department of Transportation (PennDOT)
- Puerto Rico Department of Transportation and Public Works (DTOP)
- Rhode Island Department of Transportation (RIDOT)
- South Carolina Department of Transportation (SCDOT)
- South Dakota Department of Transportation (SDDOT)
- Tennessee Department of Transportation (TDOT)
- Texas Department of Transportation (TxDOT)
- Utah Department of Transportation (UDOT)
- Vermont Agency of Transportation (VTrans)
- Virginia Department of Transportation (VDOT)
- Washington State Department of Transportation (WSDOT)
- West Virginia Department of Transportation (WVDOT)
- Wisconsin Department of Transportation (WisDOT)
- Wyoming Department of Transportation (WYDOT)

== Notable bridges ==
- Akashi Kaikyō Bridge
- Alcantara Bridge
- Brooklyn Bridge
- Chapel Bridge
- Charles Bridge
- Chengyang Bridge
- Chesapeake Bay Bridge
- Gateshead Millennium Bridge
- George Washington Bridge
- Golden Gate Bridge
- Great Belt Bridge
- Hangzhou Bay Bridge
- Mackinac Bridge
- Millau Viaduct
- Ponte Vecchio
- Rainbow Bridge (Niagara Falls)
- Rialto Bridge
- Royal Gorge Bridge
- Seri Wawasan Bridge
- Seven Mile Bridge
- Stari Most
- Sunshine Skyway Bridge
- Sydney Harbour Bridge
- Tacoma Narrows Bridges
- The Confederation Bridge
- The Helix Bridge
- Tower Bridge
- Verrazzano–Narrows Bridge
- Tsing Ma Bridge

== See also ==
- List of bridges
