= Rolling bridge =

Rolling bridge may be applied to several distinct types of movable bridge:

- Guthrie rolling bridge, a type of retractable bridge, also known as a thrust bridge
- Rolling bascule bridge, a type of bascule bridge (sometimes referred to as a drawbridge)
- The Rolling Bridge, the only bridge of the curling type
- Cody Dock Rolling Bridge, a foot bridge in London, England, manually rolled through 180˚ to allow boat traffic
