= List of bridges in London =

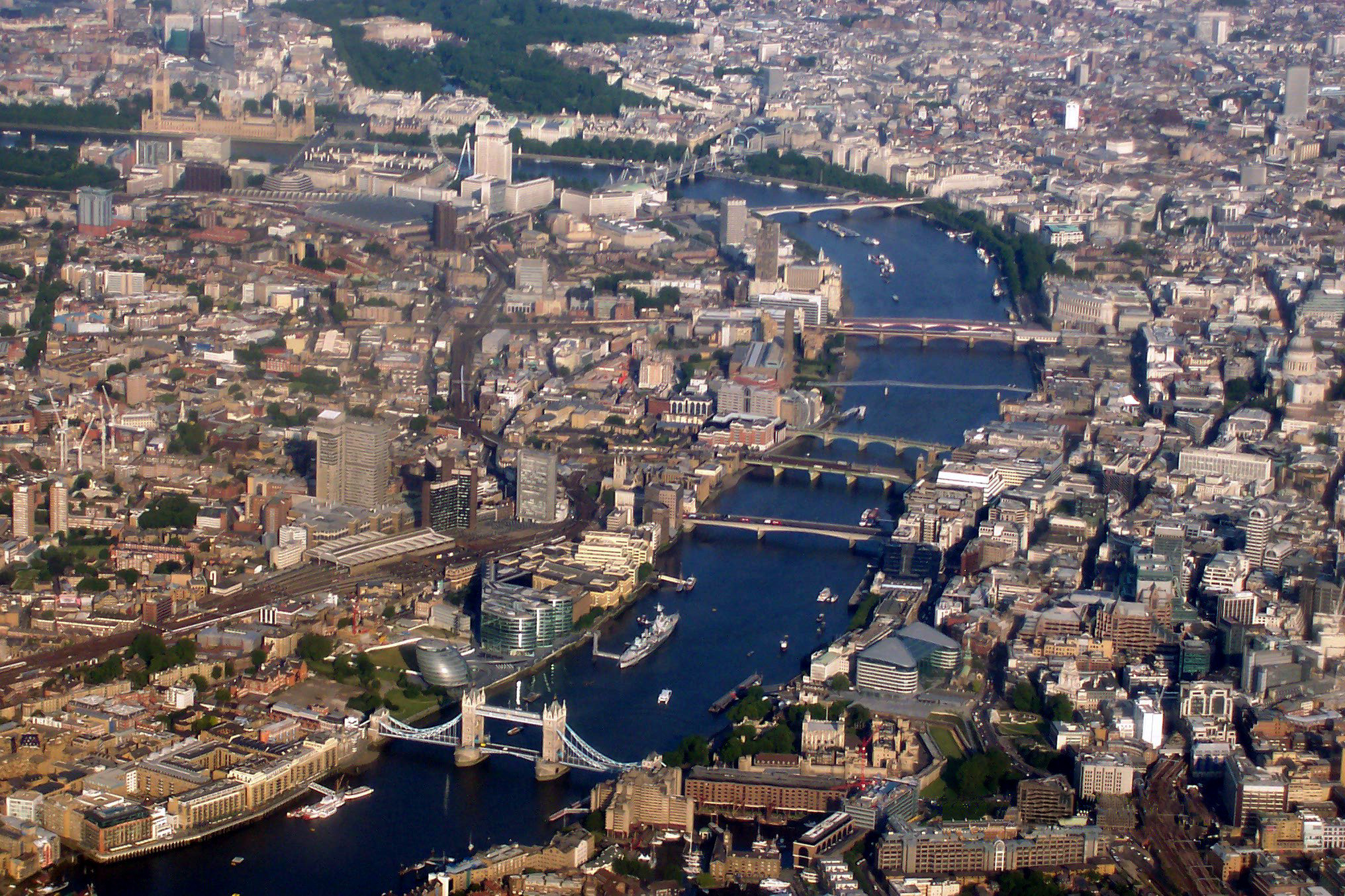
A view of bridges in the City of London, looking westwards (upstream): Tower Bridge to Westminster Bridge

List of bridges in London lists the major bridges within Greater London or within the influence of London. Most of these are river crossings, and the best-known are those across the River Thames. Several bridges on other rivers have given their names to areas of London, particularly where the whole river has become subterranean. Other bridges are high level road or rail crossings across other streets.

== River crossings ==
=== River Thames ===
Bridges over the River Thames, listed in order travelling from East to West. Multiple values in "Dates opened" pertain to earlier bridges at the site of the current structure.

Portrait	Name	Type	Dates opened	North Bank	South Bank	Maintained by
	Tower Bridge	Combination bascule / suspension	1894	Tower Hamlets	Southwark	Bridge House Estates
	London Bridge	Box girder	50 AD; 1209; 1831; 1973	City of London: Monument	Southwark	Bridge House Estates
	Cannon Street Railway Bridge	Beam	1866	City of London: Cannon Street	Southwark	Network Rail
	Southwark Bridge	Arch	1819; 1921	City of London: Queen Street	Southwark: Bankside	Bridge House Estates
	Millennium Bridge	Suspension	2000	City of London: Queenhithe	Southwark: Bankside	Bridge House Estates
	Blackfriars Railway Bridge	Arch	1864; 1886	City of London: Blackfriars	Southwark	Network Rail
	Blackfriars Bridge	Arch	1769; 1869	City of London: Blackfriars	Southwark	Bridge House Estates
	Waterloo Bridge	Box girder	1817; 1945	Westminster	Lambeth: South Bank	Transport for London
	Hungerford Bridge	Lattice truss	1864	Westminster	Lambeth: South Bank	Network Rail
	Golden Jubilee Bridges	Suspension	2002	Westminster	Lambeth: South Bank	Network Rail
	Westminster Bridge	Arch	1750; 1862	Westminster	Lambeth: South Bank	Transport for London
	Lambeth Bridge	Arch	1862; 1932	Westminster	Lambeth	Transport for London
	Vauxhall Bridge	Arch	1816; 1906	Westminster: Pimlico	Lambeth: Vauxhall	Transport for London
	Grosvenor Bridge	Arch	1859	Westminster	Wandsworth	Network Rail
	Chelsea Bridge	Suspension	1858; 1937	Kensington and Chelsea: Chelsea	Wandsworth: Battersea	Kensington and Chelsea London Borough Council
	Albert Bridge	Combined Ordish–Lefeuvre / suspension / beam	1873	Kensington and Chelsea: Chelsea	Wandsworth: Battersea	Kensington and Chelsea London Borough Council
	Battersea Bridge	Arch	1771; 1890	Kensington and Chelsea: Chelsea	Wandsworth: Battersea	Transport for London
	Battersea Railway Bridge	Arch	1863	Hammersmith and Fulham: Imperial Wharf	Wandsworth: Clapham Junction	Network Rail
	Wandsworth Bridge	Cantilever	1873; 1938	Hammersmith and Fulham: Fulham	Wandsworth: Wandsworth	Wandsworth London Borough Council
	Fulham Railway Bridge and Footbridge	Lattice girder	1889	Hammersmith and Fulham: Putney Bridge	Wandsworth: East Putney	Network Rail
	Putney Bridge	Arch	1729; 1886	Hammersmith and Fulham: Fulham	Wandsworth: Putney	Wandsworth London Borough Council
	Hammersmith Bridge	Suspension	1827; 1887	Hammersmith and Fulham: Hammersmith	Richmond upon Thames: Castelnau	Hammersmith and Fulham London Borough Council
	Barnes Railway Bridge and Footbridge	Truss arch	1849	Hounslow: Chiswick	Richmond upon Thames: Barnes	Network Rail
	Chiswick Bridge	Deck arch	1933	Hounslow: Chiswick	Richmond upon Thames: Mortlake	Transport for London
	Kew Railway Bridge	Lattice truss	1869	Hounslow: Gunnersbury	Richmond upon Thames: Kew Gardens	Network Rail
	Kew Bridge	Arch	1759; 1789; 1903	Hounslow: Brentford	Richmond upon Thames: Kew	Transport for London
	Richmond Lock and Footbridge	Arch	1894	Richmond upon Thames: St Margarets	Richmond upon Thames: Richmond	Port of London Authority
	Twickenham Bridge	Arch	1933	Richmond upon Thames: St Margarets	Richmond upon Thames: Richmond	Transport for London
	Richmond Railway Bridge	Truss arch	1848	Richmond upon Thames: St Margarets	Richmond upon Thames: Richmond	Network Rail
	Richmond Bridge	Arch	1777	Richmond upon Thames: St Margarets	Richmond upon Thames: Richmond	Richmond upon Thames London Borough Council
	Teddington Lock Footbridges	Girder (Eastern); Suspension (Western)	1889	Richmond upon Thames: Teddington	Richmond upon Thames: Ham	Richmond upon Thames London Borough Council
	Kingston Railway Bridge	Arch	1863	Richmond upon Thames: Hampton Wick	Kingston upon Thames: Kingston	Network Rail
	Kingston Bridge	Arch	1190; 1828	Richmond upon Thames: Hampton Wick	Kingston upon Thames: Kingston upon Thames	Kingston upon Thames London Borough Council
	Hampton Court Bridge	Arch	1753; 1778; 1865; 1933	Richmond upon Thames: Hampton Court Palace	Surrey: East Molesey	Surrey County Council

=== River Lea ===
- Lea Bridge
- Lower Lea Crossing

=== Subterranean rivers ===
- Knightsbridge across the River Westbourne
- Stamford Bridge across Counter's Creek

=== Canals and docks ===
- Cody Dock Rolling Bridge
- Merchant Square Footbridge
- The Rolling Bridge
- Royal Victoria Dock Bridge

== Road and foot bridges ==
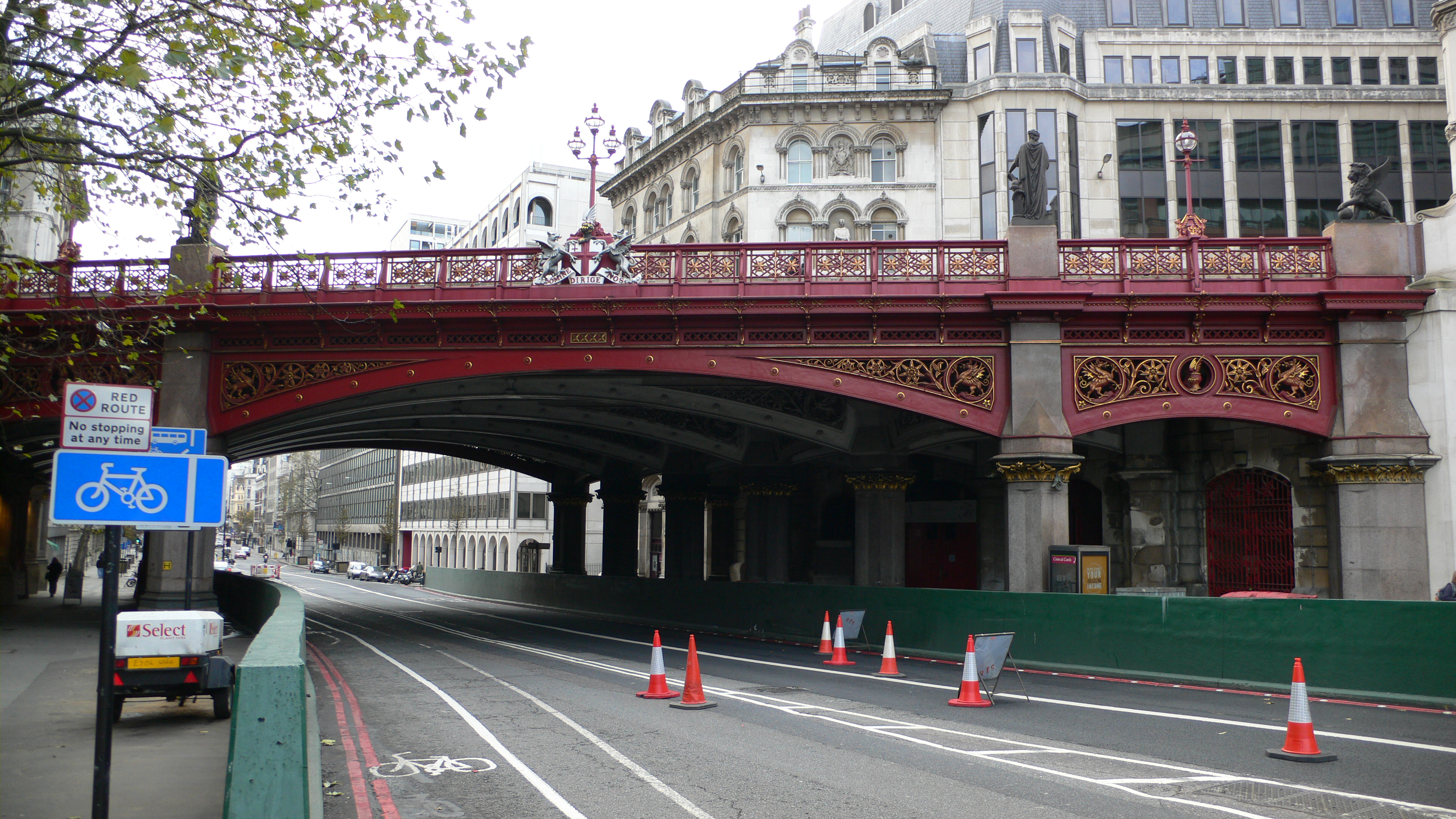
The Holborn Viaduct, 2005

- Archway, London
- Bishop's Bridge
- Croydon Flyover
- Hammersmith Flyover
- Holborn Viaduct across Fleet River
- Three Bridges
- White Horse Bridge

== Railway bridges ==
- Arnos Park Viaduct
- Dollis Brook Viaduct
- Kingsland Viaduct
- Wharncliffe Viaduct

== Illuminated River artwork ==
In 2016 an international competition was launched to design a public artwork in Central London across 15 bridges on the River Thames, from Tower Bridge to Albert Bridge, with a minimum lifespan of 10 years. A design by American artist Leo Villareal in collaboration with British architects Lifschutz Davidson Sandilands was selected from 105 entries by an independent competition jury in November 2016. This will be one of the UK's largest ever public art commissions.

The first phase - Southwark Bridge, Millennium Bridge, London Bridge and Cannon Street Bridge - was switched on in July 2019. The Illuminated River artwork was completed in April 2021 with the illumination of Blackfriars Bridge, Waterloo Bridge, Golden Jubilee Footbridges, Westminster Bridge and Lambeth Bridge. The artwork employs LED light fittings, replacing less efficient forms of lighting in places.

The installation’s colour scheme is in part influenced by famous paintings of the Thames, as noted by The Times: “The colours and tones used in the paintings of those inveterate Thames-watchers Monet, Whistler and Turner provide some of the inspiration, while at Westminster [bridge] a shade of green was chosen to complement the colour of the leather upholstery in the House of Commons”. An article in The Guardian stated: "The project... has been much trickier and taken longer to realise than anticipated." A three-part Channel 4 documentary, which started in July 2019, covered the project up to the end of the first phase.

== See also ==
- Tideway
- List of crossings of the River Thames
- Tunnels underneath the River Thames
