= Hörn Bridge =

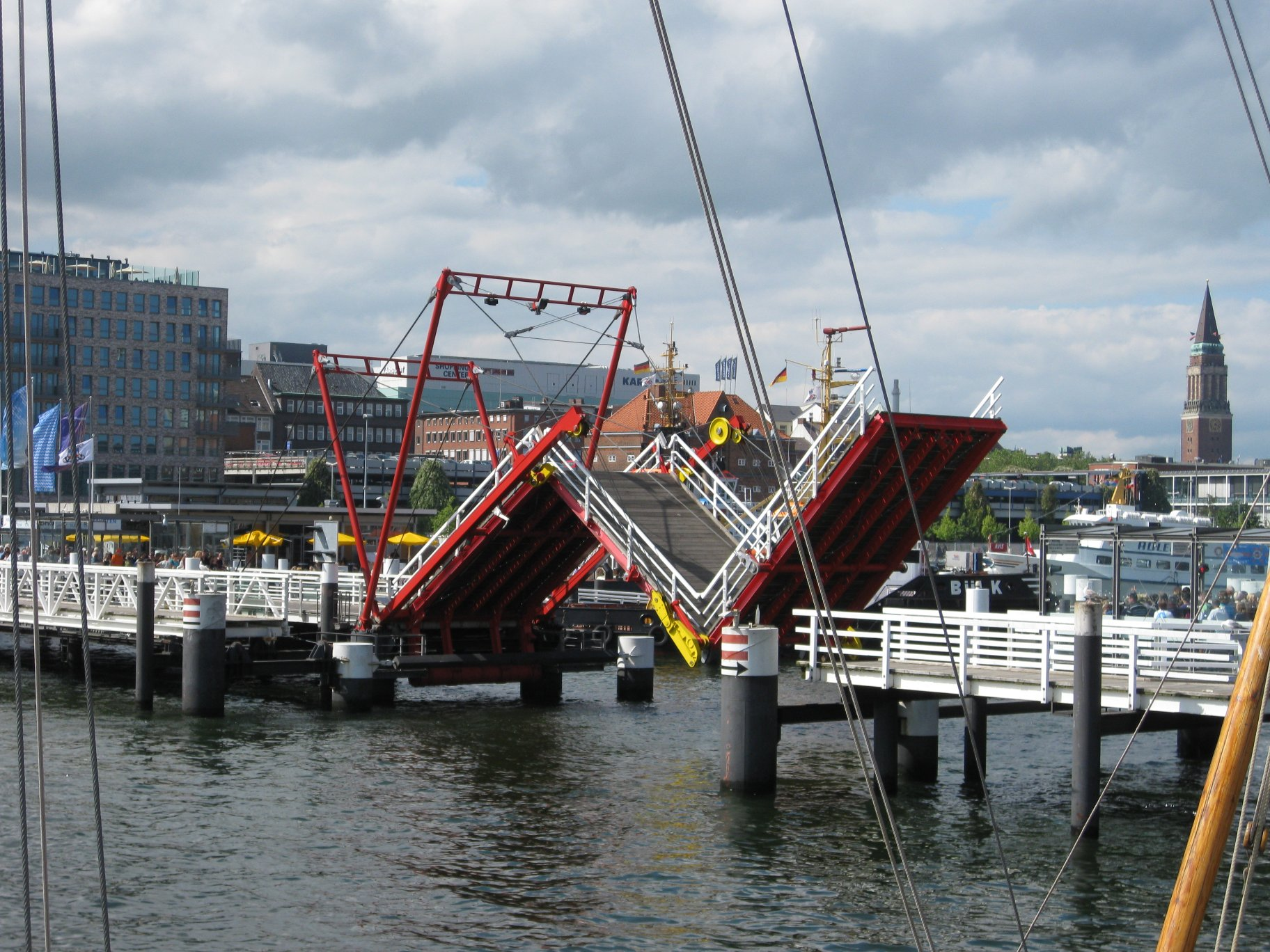
- Coordinates: 54°18′54″N 10°08′10″E
- Carries: Pedestrians
- Crosses: Kiel Fjord
- Locale: Kiel, Germany

Characteristics
- Design: Folding bridge
- Longest span: 25.5 metres (84 ft)

History
- Designer: Gerkan, Marg and Partners

Animated Kinematic Diagram of the Hörn Bridge. Cables light up when being winched.

The movement of a folding bridge

The Hörn Bridge (German: Hörnbrücke) is a folding bridge in the city of Kiel in the German state of Schleswig-Holstein. The bridge spans the end of the Kiel Fjord (called Hörn) and was designed by Gerkan, Marg and Partners.

== Design and construction ==
The Hörn Bridge is a three-segment bascule bridge with a main span of 25.5 metres (84 ft) that folds in the shape of the letter "N". The bridge was built in 1997 and cost DM 16 million.

Many Kielians were skeptical in regard to the design. There were repeated malfunctions of the mechanism upon startup, hence one of its nicknames, the "Klappt-Nix-Brücke" (Works-not Bridge). In order to ensure crossing for pedestrians and cyclists, a hydraulically operated retractable bridge was built directly adjacent as an interim solution and is still used during repair and maintenance of the folding bridge. The Hörn Bridge is now accepted as a technical masterpiece and has become a tourist attraction.

== Location ==
The Hörn Bridge is 5 metres (16 ft) wide and connects the city centre on the west bank of the Hörn with the Gaarden quarter on the east bank. The pedestrian bridge is especially important for passengers connecting between the Norway Ferry Terminal (Norwegenkai) and the main railway station.

Usually the bridge opens once every hour in order to allow small- and medium-sized ships to travel in and out of the Hörn.

The bridge offers one of the best panoramic views of the city of Kiel. It is also at the beginning and terminating point of a scenic route: the tourist route from Bremervörde to the Kieler Förde connects approximately 50 different ferries, bridges, ship locks, tidal barriers and maritime museums and its landmarks of the Rendsburg and Osten transporter bridges.
