= Merchant Square Footbridge =

Moveable pedestrian bridge spanning a canal in Paddington, London

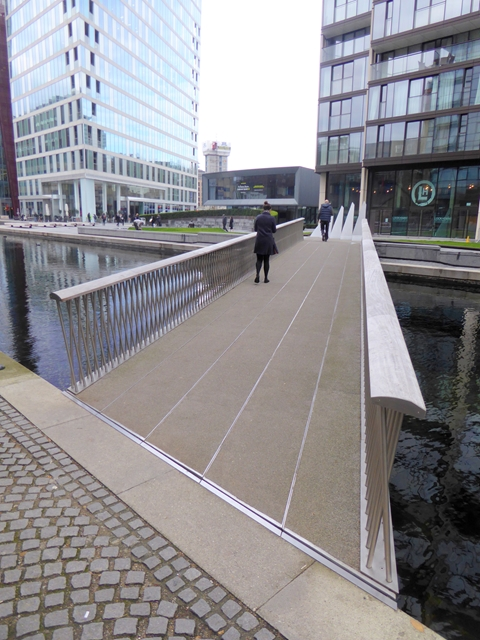
- Each section of the bridge rises independently, with separate counterweights visible at the far side
- Coordinates: 51.5187°N 0.1719°W
- Carries: Pedestrians
- Crosses: Grand Union Canal
- Locale: Merchant Square (a development of six buildings)
- Owner: European Land

Characteristics
- Design: Longitudinal segmented bascule with counterweights
- Material: Steel segments, concrete, hydraulic actuators, stainless steel handrails with LED downlighting
- Total length: 20 metres (66 ft)
- Width: 3 metres (9.8 ft)
- No. of spans: 1
- Load limit: Pedestrian
- Clearance above: 2.5 metres (8 ft 2 in) at mid-channel

History
- Architect: Knight Architects
- Engineering design by: AKT II (structural); Eadon Consulting (mechanical, hydraulic, electrical)
- Constructed by: Mace
- Construction end: 2014

References
- http://www.archdaily.com/553405/merchant-square-footbridge-knight-architects

The Merchant Square Footbridge (also known as The Fan Bridge) is a moveable pedestrian bridge spanning a canal in Paddington, London. It is composed of five side-by side sections of varying lengths, with offset pivots to accommodate the varying lengths. When opened, the segments are brought to varying angles of elevation. The visual effect when opened has been likened to that of a Japanese fan.

Not to be confused with the Fan Bridge which crosses Holland Brook (formerly known as the Holland River) between Little Clacton and Great Holland in Essex (UK) (OS Grid Ref: TM 19710 18667 / Latitude 51°49'24"N Longitude 1°11'12"E). This was the lowest crossing-point until the Gunfleet estuary was reclaimed in the 1700s.

== See also ==
- List of bridges in London
- Moveable bridges for a list of other moveable bridge types
- The Rolling Bridge
