= Table bridge =

Moveable bridge in which the deck moves along the vertical axis

- Animation of operation
- Span range: Short
- Material: Steel
- Movable: Yes
- Design effort: Medium
- Falsework required: No

A table bridge is a moveable bridge in which the deck moves vertically. Two or four hydraulic pillars under the bridge, one or two at each end, raise the bridge deck to allow boat traffic to pass beneath it. In contrast to a lift bridge, where the deck is pulled upwards along towers, the deck of a table bridge is pushed upwards by otherwise hidden pillars. The name originates from the fact that when open it resembles a table.

The total space required by a table bridge is hardly larger than the bridge deck, which is not the case with a retractable bridge. Unlike a lift bridge this type has only slight visual impact upon its surroundings when closed for use by road traffic. This is very well demonstrated by the Pont levant Notre Dame at Tournai in Belgium.

== Examples of table bridges ==
Several rivers and waterways are home to multiple examples of table bridges. These include:

- Erie Canal in New York between Lockport and the Genesee River is home to one of the largest collection of table bridges
- Gulf Intracoastal Waterway between the Judge Perez Bridge in Louisiana and the Veterans Memorial Bridge in Texas (including Bayou Lafourche and Bayou Terrebonne in Louisiana) features several table bridges
- Trent-Severn Waterway in Ontario; both table bridges and bobtail swing bridges are located along its entire length
- Multiple road bridges in Milwaukee, Wisconsin

== A table bridge in operation ==
Three views of the Pont levant Notre-Dame on the Scheldt River at Tournai, Belgium

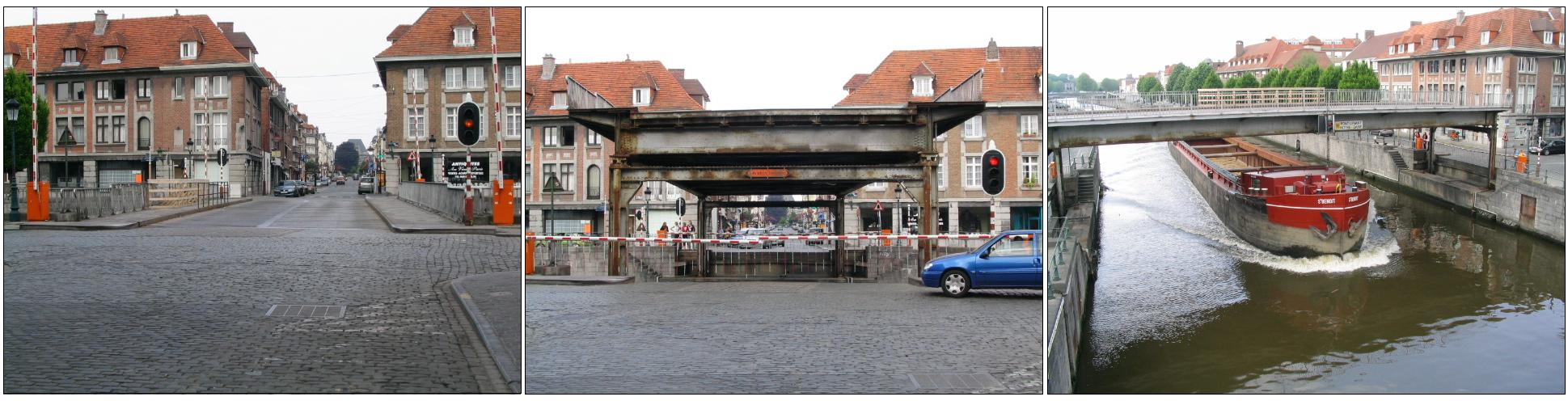
Left: Looking across the Pont levant Notre Dame (in front of the first row of buildings); Center: Seen from the same viewpoint, the bridge is up; Right: Overlooking the canalized river, a self-propelled canal boat passes

== See also ==
- Moveable bridges for a list of other movable bridge types
- Submersible bridge for a similar bridge that disappears by moving down
