= Submersible bridge =

Bridge that lowers the deck into the water

- Submerging
- Span range: Short
- Material: Steel
- Movable: Yes
- Design effort: Medium
- Falsework required: No

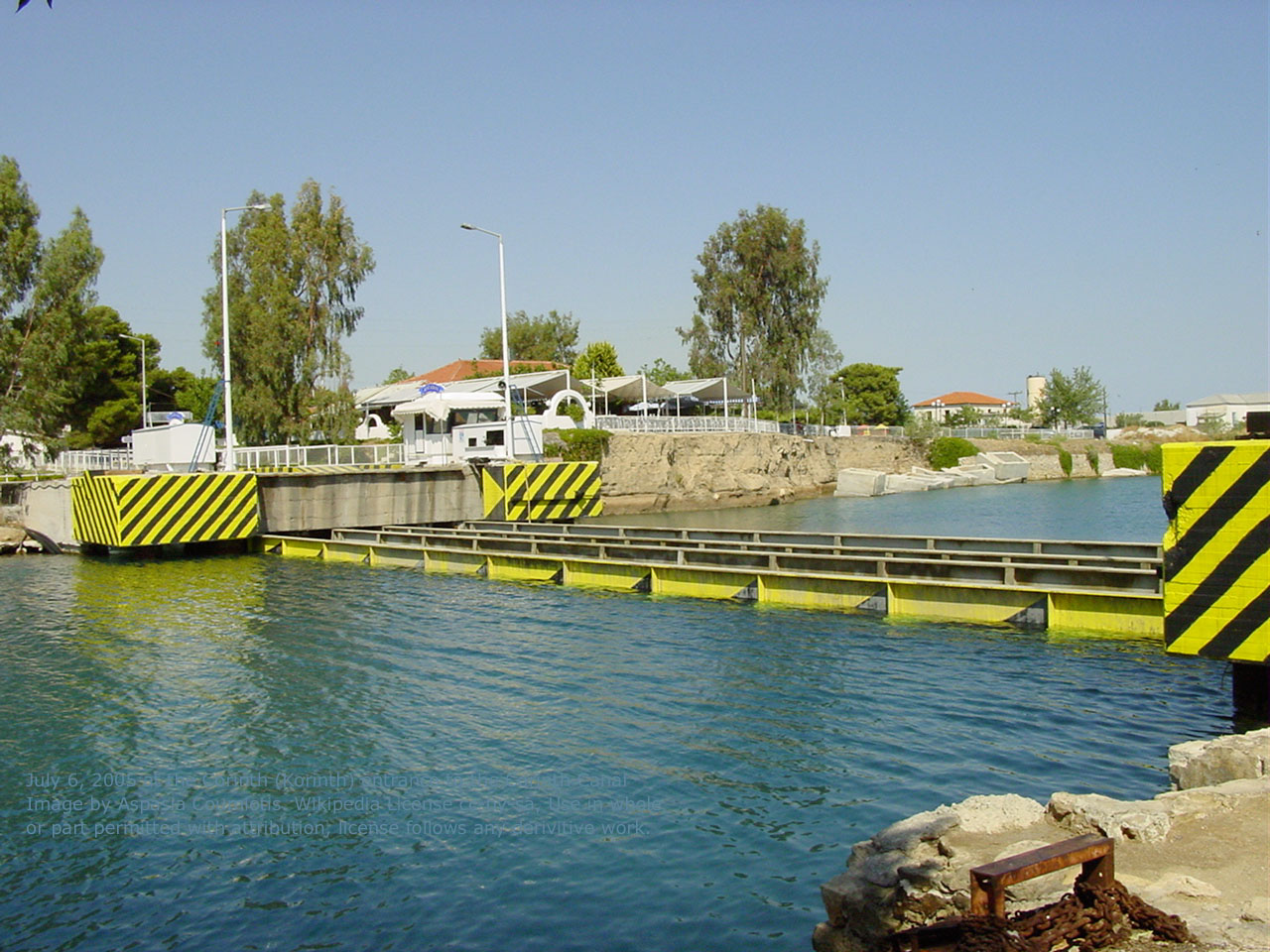
A submersible bridge at the entrance of Corinth Canal. Two pairs of guard rails are visible, with the single-lane roadbeds still underwater between each pair.

A submersible bridge is a type of movable bridge that lowers the bridge deck below the water level to permit waterborne traffic to use the waterway. This differs from a lift bridge or table bridge, which operates by raising the roadway. Two submersible bridges exist across the Corinth Canal in Greece, one at each end, in Isthmia and Corinth. They lower the centre span to 8 metres below water level when they give way to vessels crossing the channel.

The submersible bridge's primary advantage over the similar lift bridge is that there is no structure above the shipping channel and thus no height limitation on ship traffic. This is particularly important for sailing vessels. Additionally, the lack of an above-deck structure is considered aesthetically pleasing, a similarity shared with the Chicago-style bascule bridge and the table bridge. However, the presence of the submerged bridge structure limits the draft of vessels in the waterway.

The term submersible bridge is also sometimes applied to a non-movable bridge that is designed to withstand submersion and high currents when the water level rises. Such a bridge is more properly called a low water bridge.

== See also ==
- Low water crossing, a non-moving bridge that is sometimes submerged
- Moveable bridges for a list of other moveable bridge types
- Table bridge, a similar bridge that moves upward
- Underwater bridge, a non-moving military bridge that is always submerged
