= Folding bridge =

Moveable bridge capable of folding to allow passage of watercraft

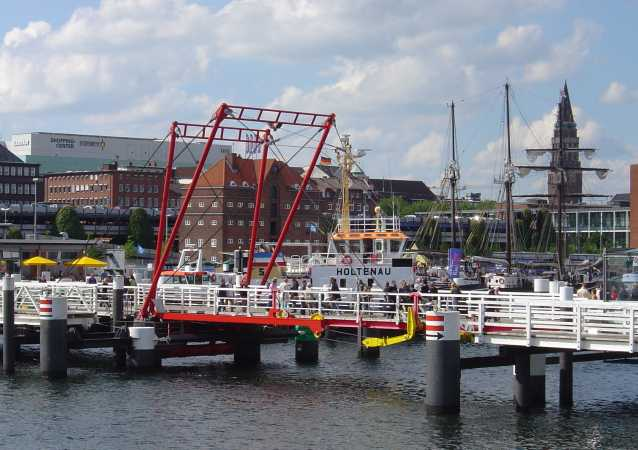
- Hörnbrücke in Kiel
- Span range: Short
- Material: Steel
- Movable: Yes
- Design effort: High
- Falsework required: No

A folding bridge is a type of moveable bridge engineered to fold. This allows ship traffic to pass through the waterway that the bridge spans.

An example of a folding bridge is the Hörnbrücke (Hörn Bridge) in the city of Kiel in the German state of Schleswig-Holstein. When the bridge is down it spans 25.5 metres (84 ft) across the Kiel Fjord, known as the Hörn. The three-segment bascule bridge folds up into the shape of the capital letter N to allow for ship and boat traffic.

Two of the first folding bridges were built in Chicago by Shailer & Schniglau out of steel. The first stood between 1891 and 1899 at the Weed Street. The second was built in 1893 but was demolished 10 years later due to it being repeatedly out of service and two boat collisions in 1900. It had an 89-foot span and a width of 35 feet. The jack-knife design was eventually abandoned because its numerous joints required frequent and expensive maintenance.

The movement of a folding bridge

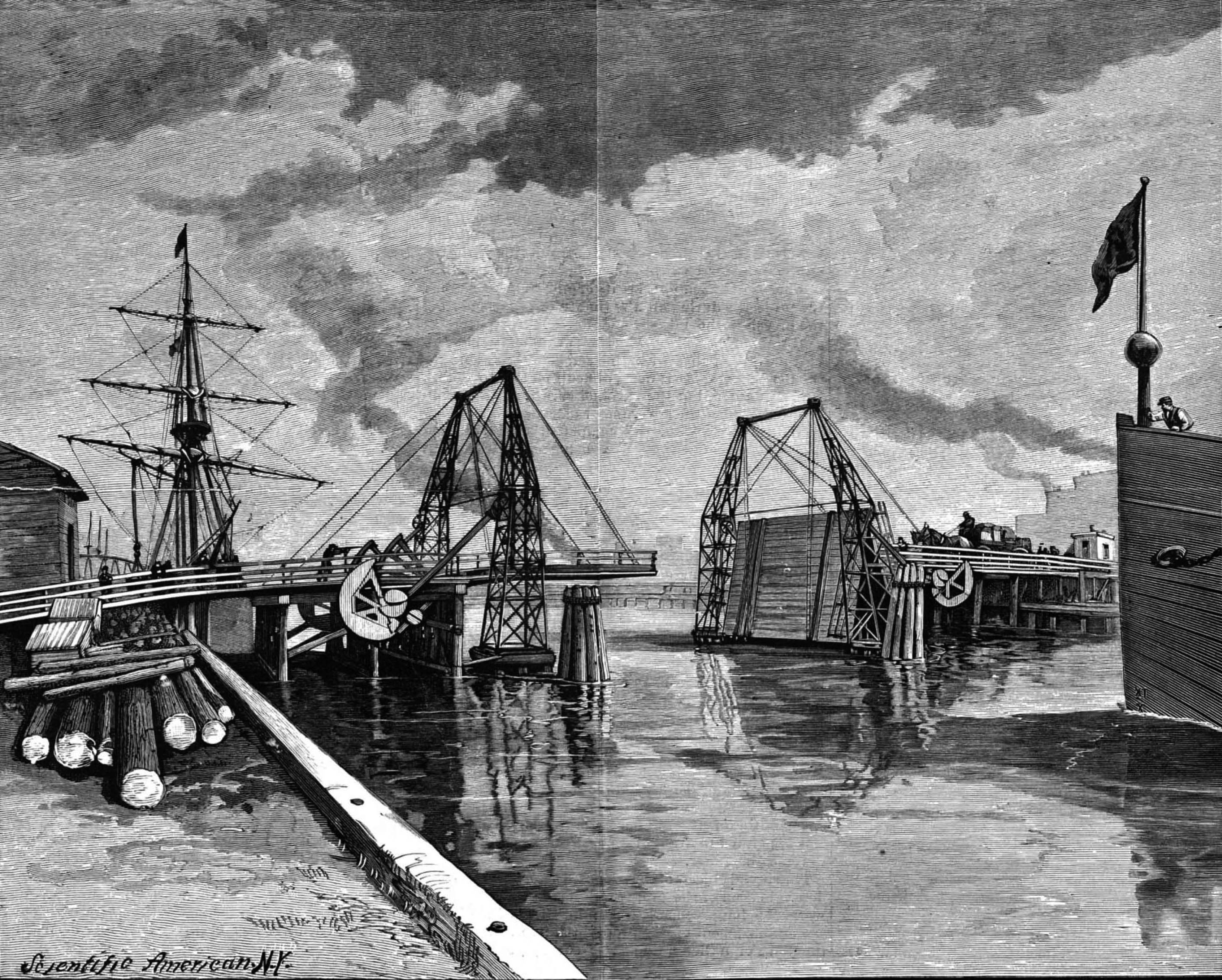
Folding Bridge at Weed Street, Chicago (1891)

== See also ==
- Bascule bridge
- Double-beam drawbridge
- Drawbridge
- Moveable bridges for a list of other moveable bridge types
