= Tilt bridge =

Moveable bridge which rotates about fixed endpoints rather than lifting or bending

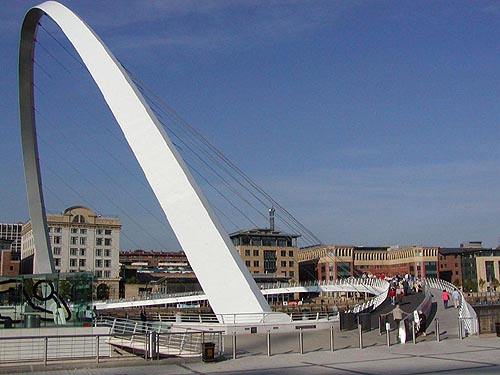
Gateshead Millennium Bridge lowered

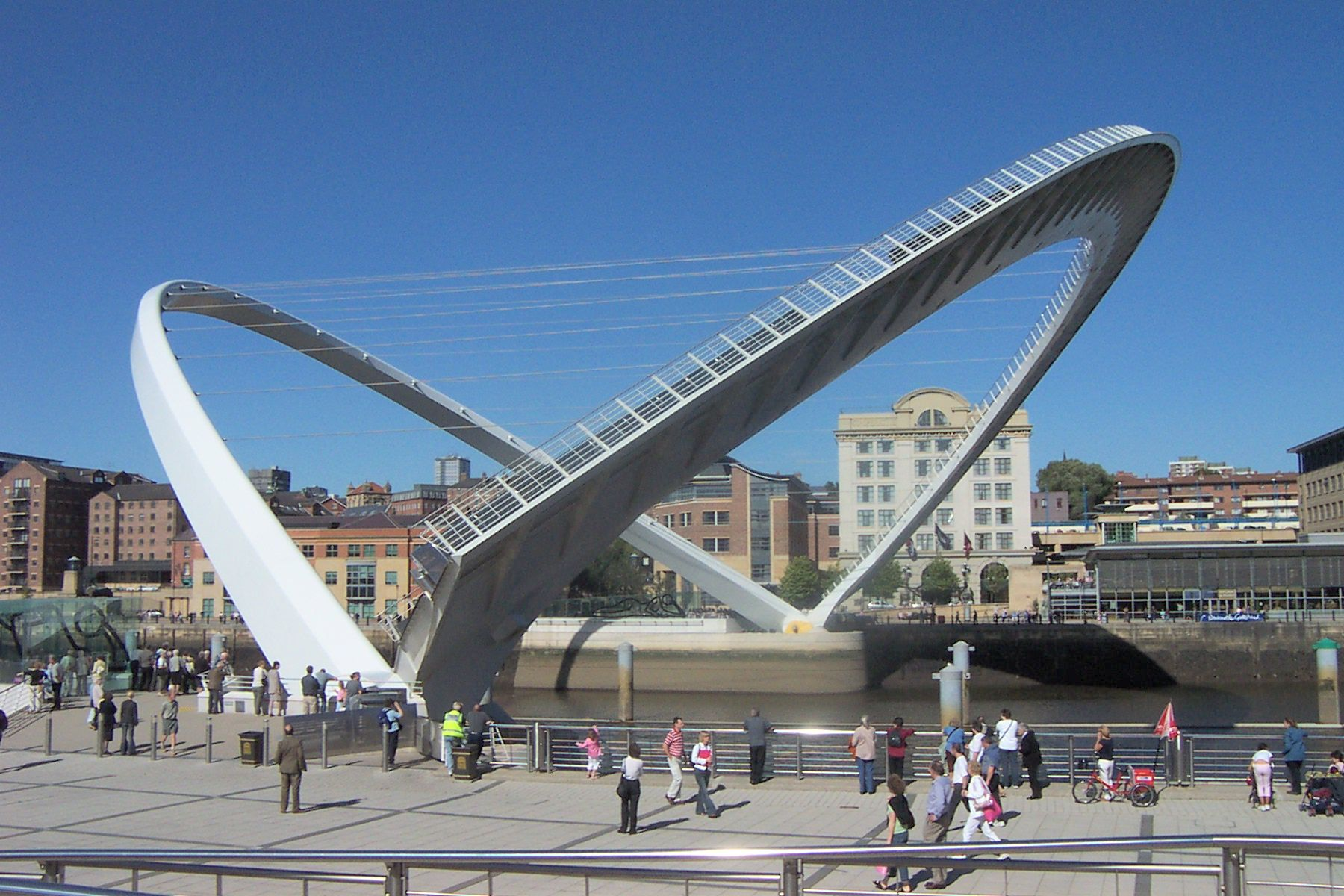
Millennium Bridge open for river traffic

A tilt bridge is a type of moveable bridge which rotates about fixed endpoints rather than lifting or bending, as with a drawbridge. The tilting Gateshead Millennium Bridge spanning the River Tyne between Gateshead on the south bank and Newcastle upon Tyne, England, on the north is a pedestrian bridge with two large hydraulic rams at each side that tilt the structure back allowing small watercraft to pass under.

The pedestrian and cycle pathway is an almost-horizontal curve, suspended above the river from a just-beyond-the-vertical parabolic arch. To raise the bridge, this whole assembly rotates as a single, rigid structure. As the arch tilts lower, the pathway rises, each counterbalancing the other so that a minimum of energy is needed. The resultant appearance in motion leads to it sometimes being called the "eyelid bridge", since its shape is akin to the blinking of an eye if seen from along the river.

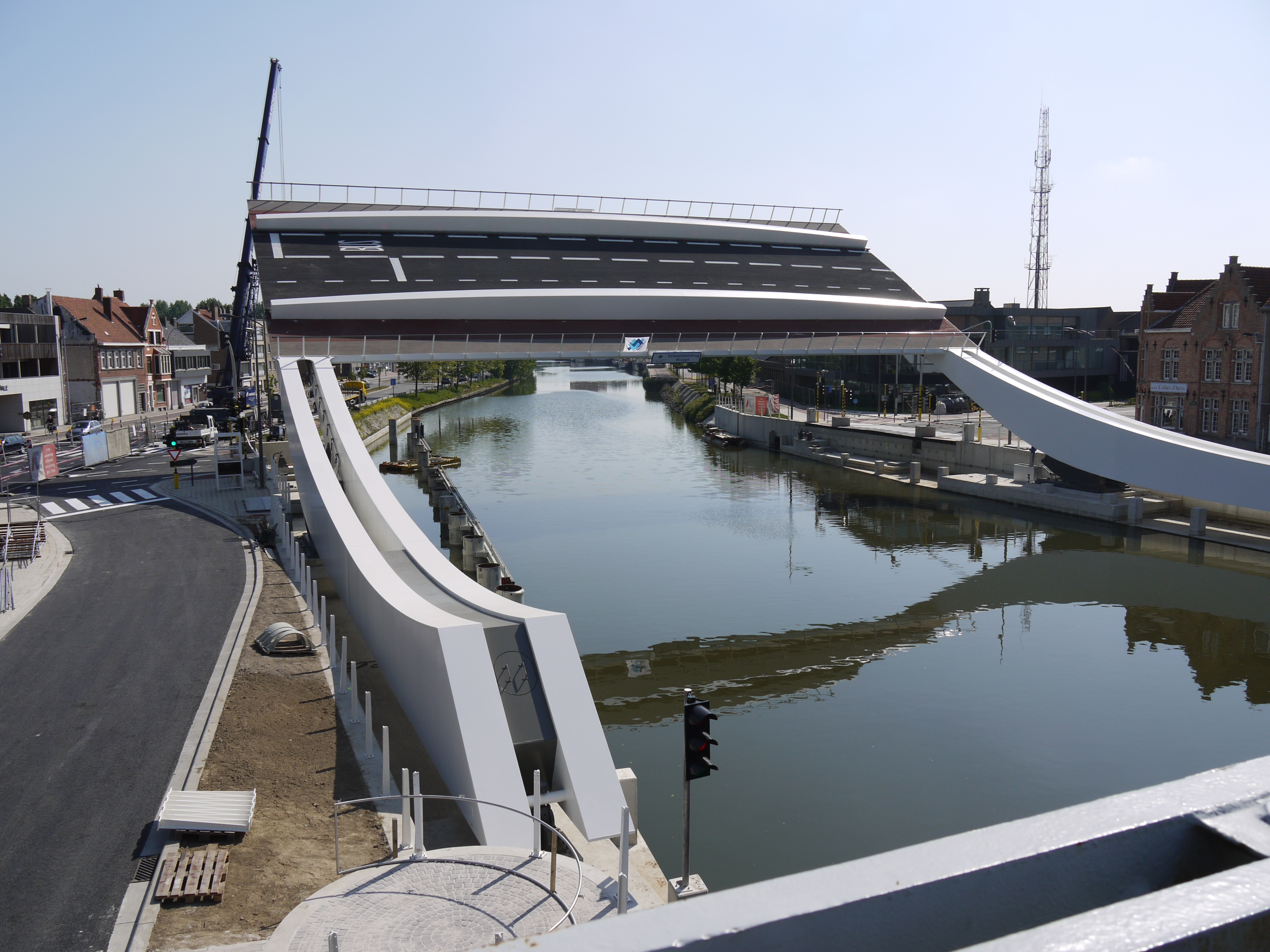
Scheepsdalebrug during construction in raised position

Two further tilt bridges are in Belgium, both constructed in 2011: the Scheepsdalebrug (Scheepsdalebridge) in Brugge and the Sint-Annabrug over the river Dender in Aalst. The former combines the working mechanisms of a rolling lift bascule bridge and a tilt bridge: the bridge is mounted on two lifting arms which roll along racks, positioned parallel to the navigable way, tilting up the bridge leaf providing a clearance for passing ships. The latter is mounted on two lifting arms which are connected to fixed pivot points a few feet downstream from the bridge leaf.

Tilt bridge animation

== Gallery ==
A selection of tilt bridges

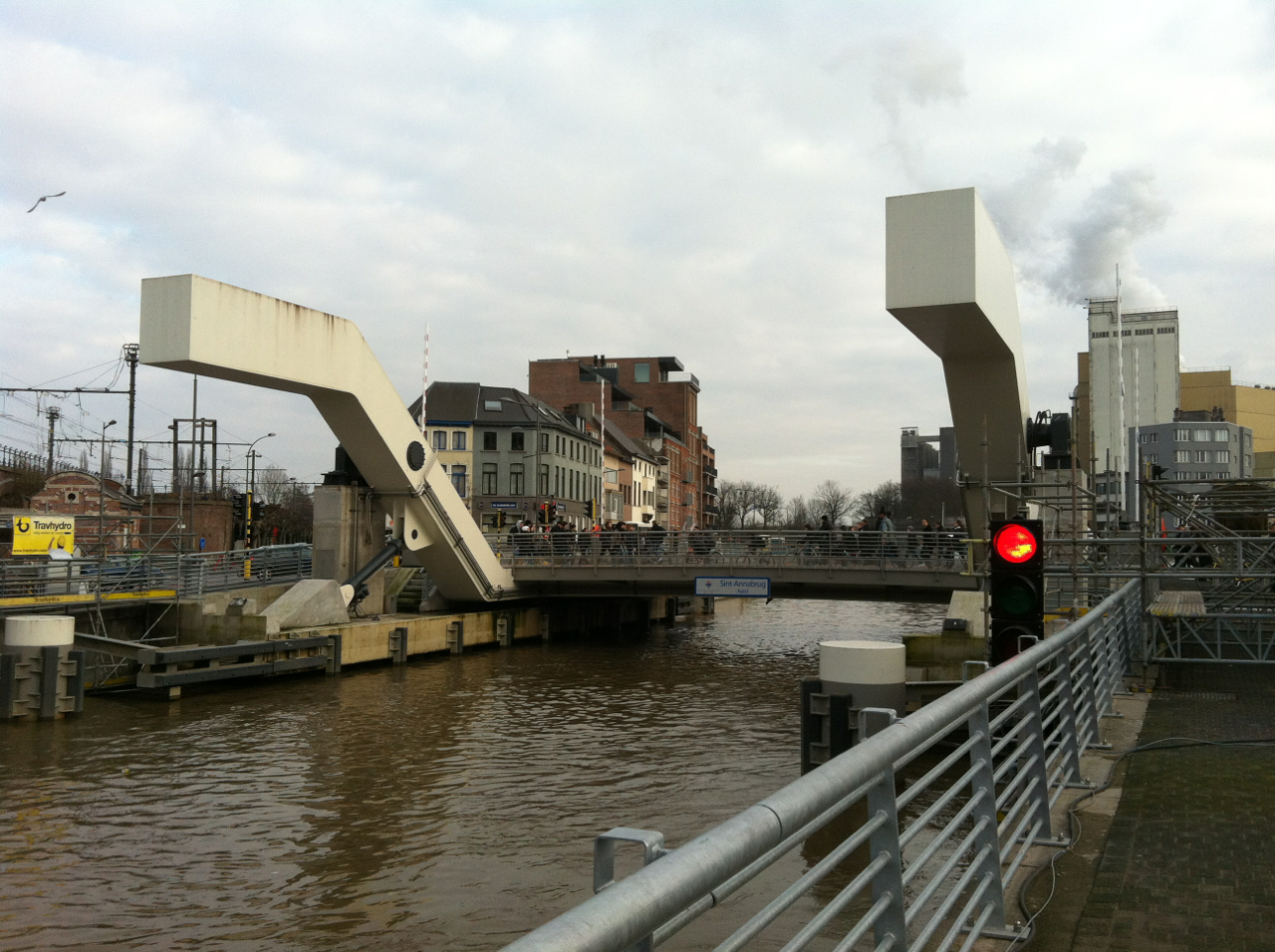
Sint-Annabrug in Aalst, Belgium

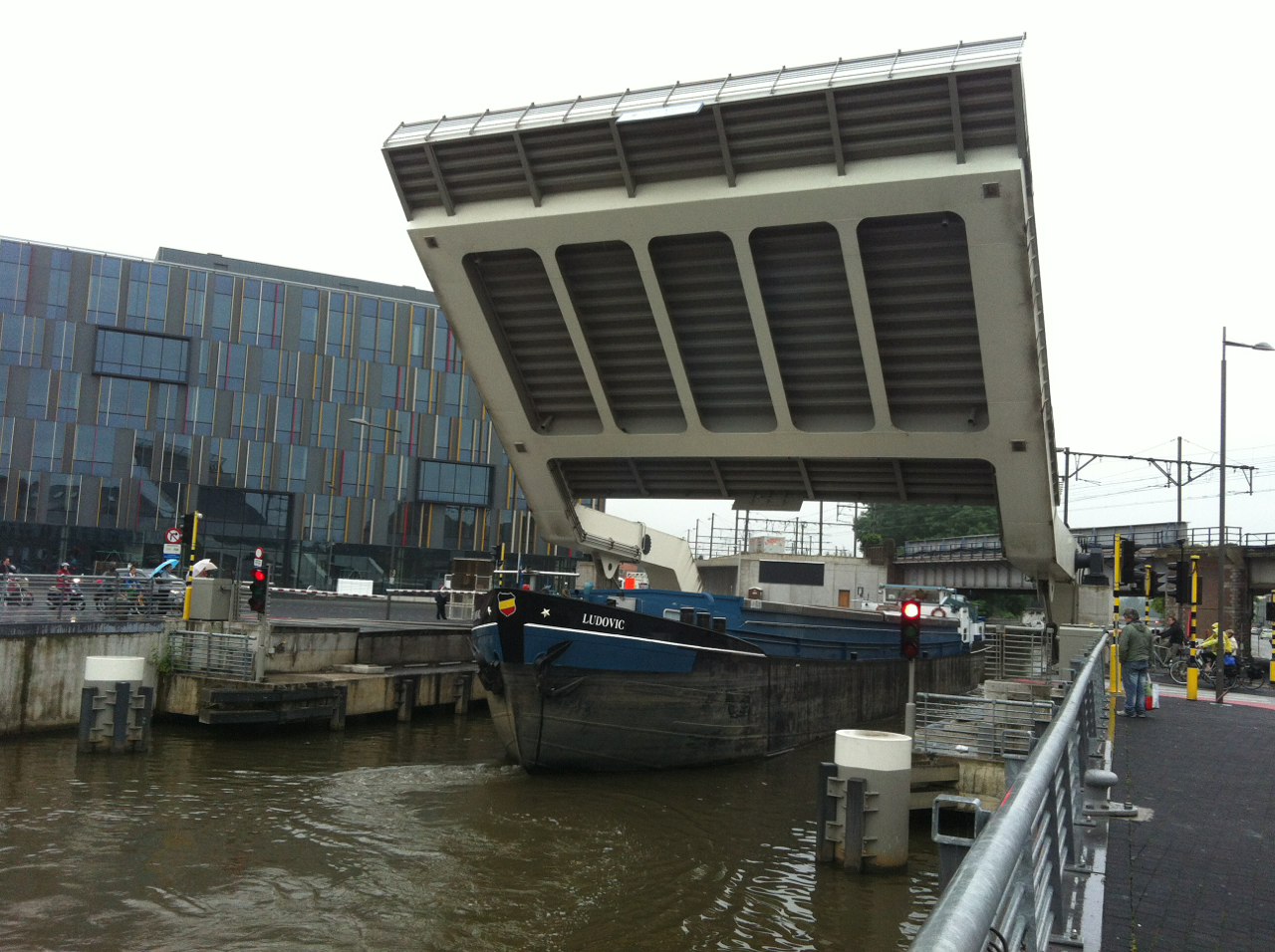
Sint-Annabrug raised to allow a vessel to pass through

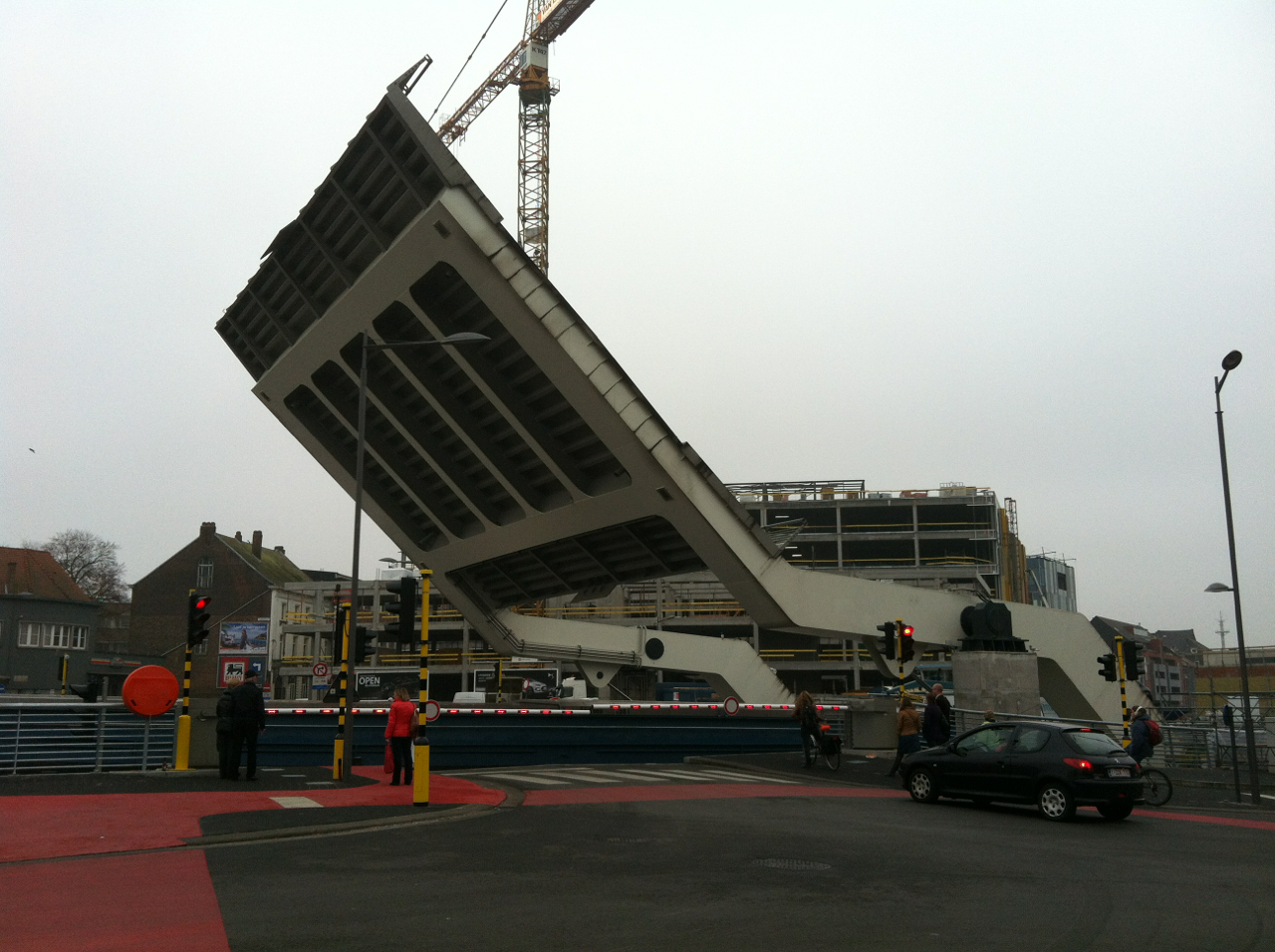
Frontal view of the Sint-Annabrug in raised position
