= Cody Dock Rolling Bridge =

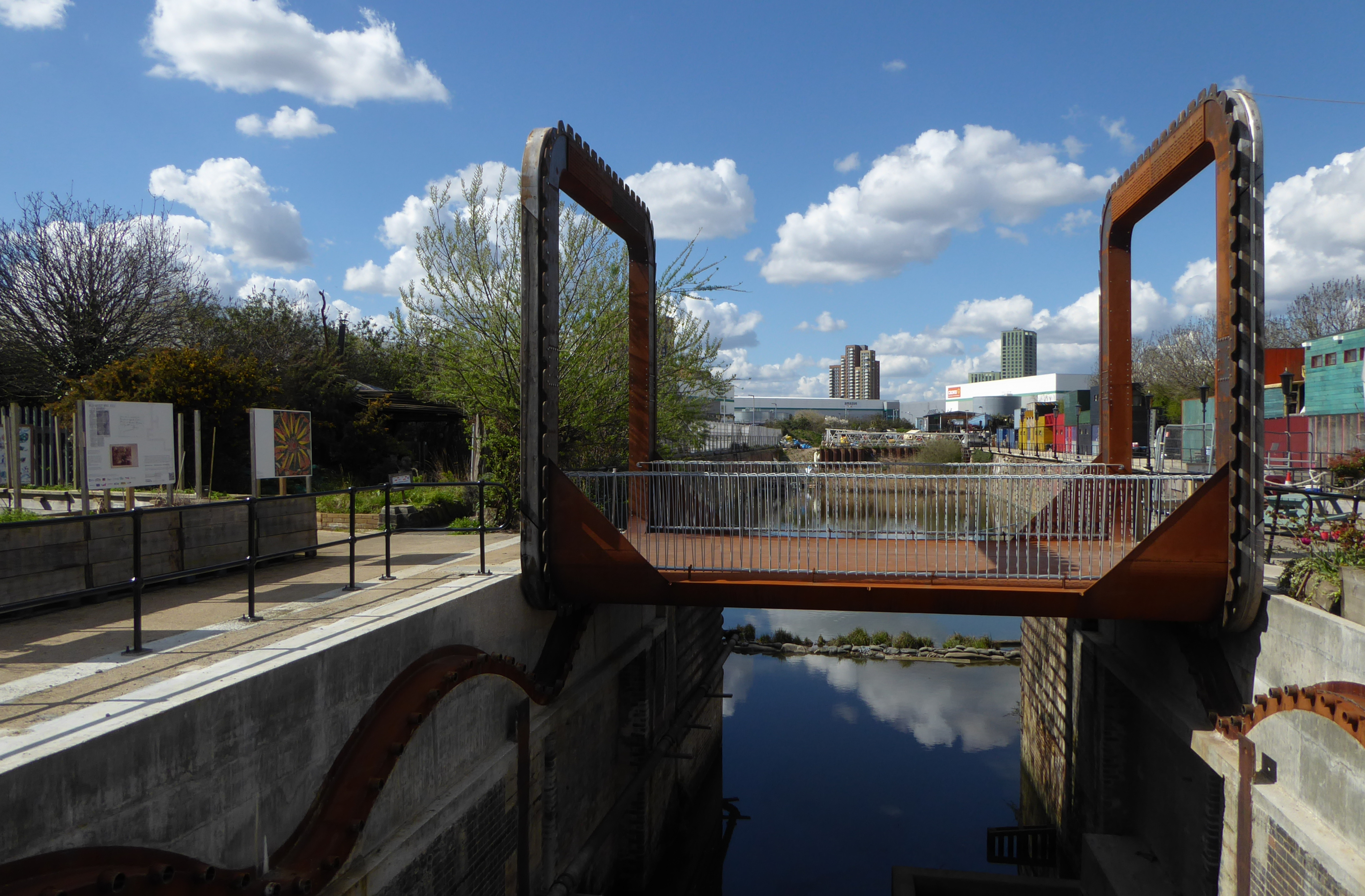
- Coordinates: 51.51861°N 0.00274°W,
- Carries: Pedestrians and bicycles
- Crosses: A channel that runs from River Lea to a nearby dock
- Locale: East London

Characteristics
- Design: Moveable
- Material: Iron and wood
- Traversable?: Yes

History
- Architect: Thomas Randall-Page and Tim Lucas of the engineers Price & Myers
- Constructed by: Cake Industries

Location
- Interactive map of Cody Dock Rolling Bridge

The Cody Dock Rolling Bridge is a moveable pedestrian bridge in London, England at Cody Dock. The bridge is manually rolled using winches to alternate between pedestrian and boat traffic. It crosses a channel that runs from River Lea to a nearby dock. It was designed by Thomas Randall-Page and Tim Lucas, and built by Cake Industries.

The concept for a rectangular rolling frame came from an article titled Roads and Wheels by mathematicians Leon Hall and Stan Wagon and an interactive exhibit of square-wheeled tricycles at the MoMath museum.
