= The Rolling Bridge =

Curling moveable bridge in London

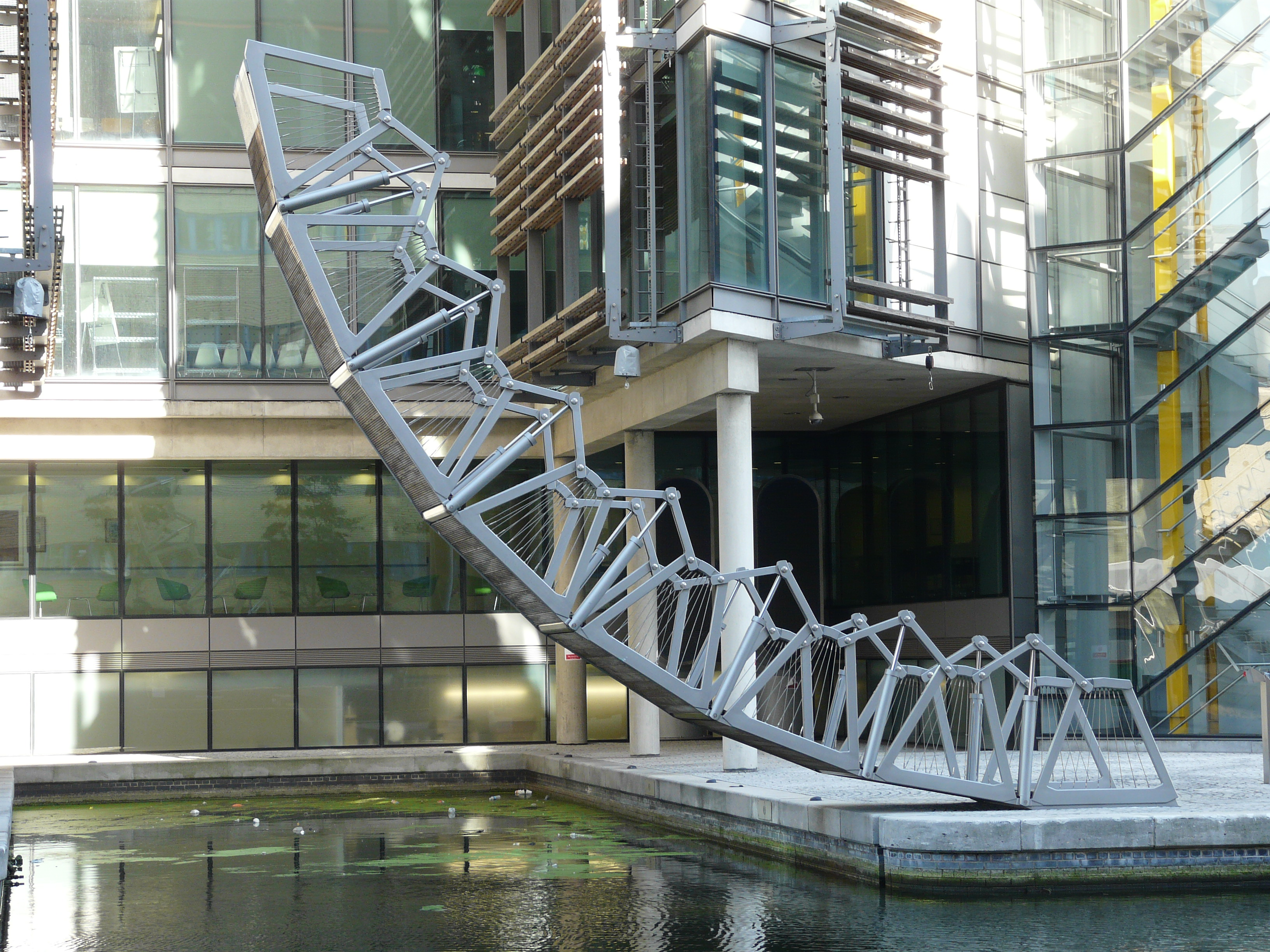
- Half curled
- Coordinates: 51.518390°N 0.174735°W
- Carries: Pedestrians

Characteristics
- Design: Truss bridge
- Material: Triangular steel segments, hydraulic actuators, lightweight deck
- Total length: 12 metres (39 ft)

History
- Designer: Thomas Heatherwick Studio
- Engineering design by: SKM Anthony Hunts and Packman Lucas
- Constructed by: Littlehampton Welding Ltd
- Construction end: 2005
- Construction cost: £500,000

Location
- Interactive map of The Rolling Bridge

The Rolling Bridge is a kinetic sculpture, and a unique type of curling moveable bridge, completed in 2004 as part of the Grand Union Canal office and retail development project at Paddington Basin, London.

In the past, the bridge used to be rolled up every Friday around midday. Unfortunately, the hydraulic system for rolling it up no longer works today.

== Design ==
Video clip of opening and closing of the Rolling Bridge, at Paddington Basin, London. The clip is shown at five times the original speed.

The Rolling Bridge was conceived by Thomas Heatherwick. It consists of eight triangular sections hinged at the walkway level and connected above by two-part links that can be collapsed towards the deck by hydraulic cylinders mounted vertically between the sections. When extended, it resembles a conventional steel and timber footbridge, and is 12 metres (39 ft) long. To retract the bridge, the hydraulic pistons are activated and the bridge curls up until its two ends join, to form an octagonal shape measuring one half of the waterway's width at that point.

The bridge won the British Constructional Steelwork Association's British Structural Steel Design Award.

== Disadvantages ==
The Rolling Bridge could theoretically allow the passage of boats, but the small basin behind the bridge is not open to canal traffic – it is currently occupied by a fountain, and blocked by a steel barrier at surface level to prevent boats entering. It also has a very long cycle time, taking 2–3 minutes to finish moving in either direction, which compares unfavourably with traditional hand-operated canal footbridges and would cause delays on a waterway with frequent boat traffic. Finally, the detour around the open bridge is very short, so the crossing is arguably not required at all. Thus, the project is primarily public art rather than a practical structure for navigation.

The high number of complex moving parts – fourteen hydraulic rams, numerous precision bearings, and an underground machinery chamber to provide the required oil pressure – can be seen as an example of overengineering, and has led to maintenance failures where the bridge is unable to move for significant periods of time. For these reasons, the design disregards established principles of architecture and civil engineering such as form follows function.

A higher-profile water crossing in London also proposed by Heatherwick – the Garden Bridge – attracted significant criticism along similar lines for mainly targeting tourists as a novelty, rather than functioning as a practical water crossing.

== "Rolling" as a name and as a type ==
Bridge animation

Traditional use of the term "rolling bridge" dates from at least the Victorian era, and is used to describe a type of retractable drawbridge used to span a ditch or moat surrounding a fortification. That type of bridge is not hinged, and remains horizontal when it is rolled inside the gates of a fort. Modern versions are called retractable bridges or thrust bridges. One particular version of the rolling bridge type was known as the Guthrie rolling bridge, examples of which may still be seen at Fort Nelson, Portsmouth. Certain types of bascule bridges roll on an arc; an example is the Pegasus Bridge.

== See also ==
- Merchant Square Footbridge
- List of bridges in London
