= Vertical-lift bridge =

Type of movable bridge

- An animation showing how a vertical-lift bridge operates with vehicular and shipping traffic
- Span range: Short
- Material: Steel
- Movable: Yes
- Design effort: Medium
- Falsework required: Depends upon degree of prefabrication

A vertical-lift bridge or just lift bridge is a type of movable bridge in which a span rises vertically while remaining parallel with the deck.

The vertical lift offers several benefits over other movable bridges such as the bascule and swing-span bridges. Generally speaking, they cost less to build for longer moveable spans. The counterweights in a vertical lift are only required to be equal to the weight of the deck, whereas bascule bridge counterweights must weigh several times as much as the span being lifted. As a result, heavier materials can be used in the deck, and so this type of bridge is especially suited for heavy railroad use. The biggest disadvantage to the vertical-lift bridge (in comparison with many other designs) is the height restriction for vessels passing under it, due to the deck remaining suspended above the passageway.

Vertical-lift bridges gained popularity in the late 19th century as steam-powered vessels began to replace the tall ships that necessitated the height clearances afforded by bascule or swing-span bridges. They were especially popular in the Great Lakes region, where the frequency of both rail and maritime traffic made them a cost-effective choice.

Most vertical-lift bridges use towers, each equipped with counterweights. The oldest operating example is the Hawthorne Bridge over the Willamette River in Portland, Oregon, built in 1910. The Steel Bridge, also in Portland, is the only double-deck vertical-lift bridge where both decks can be lifted independently.

Another design uses balance beams to lift the deck, with pivoting bascules located on the top of the lift towers.

== See also ==
- List of vertical-lift bridges.

== Gallery of images ==
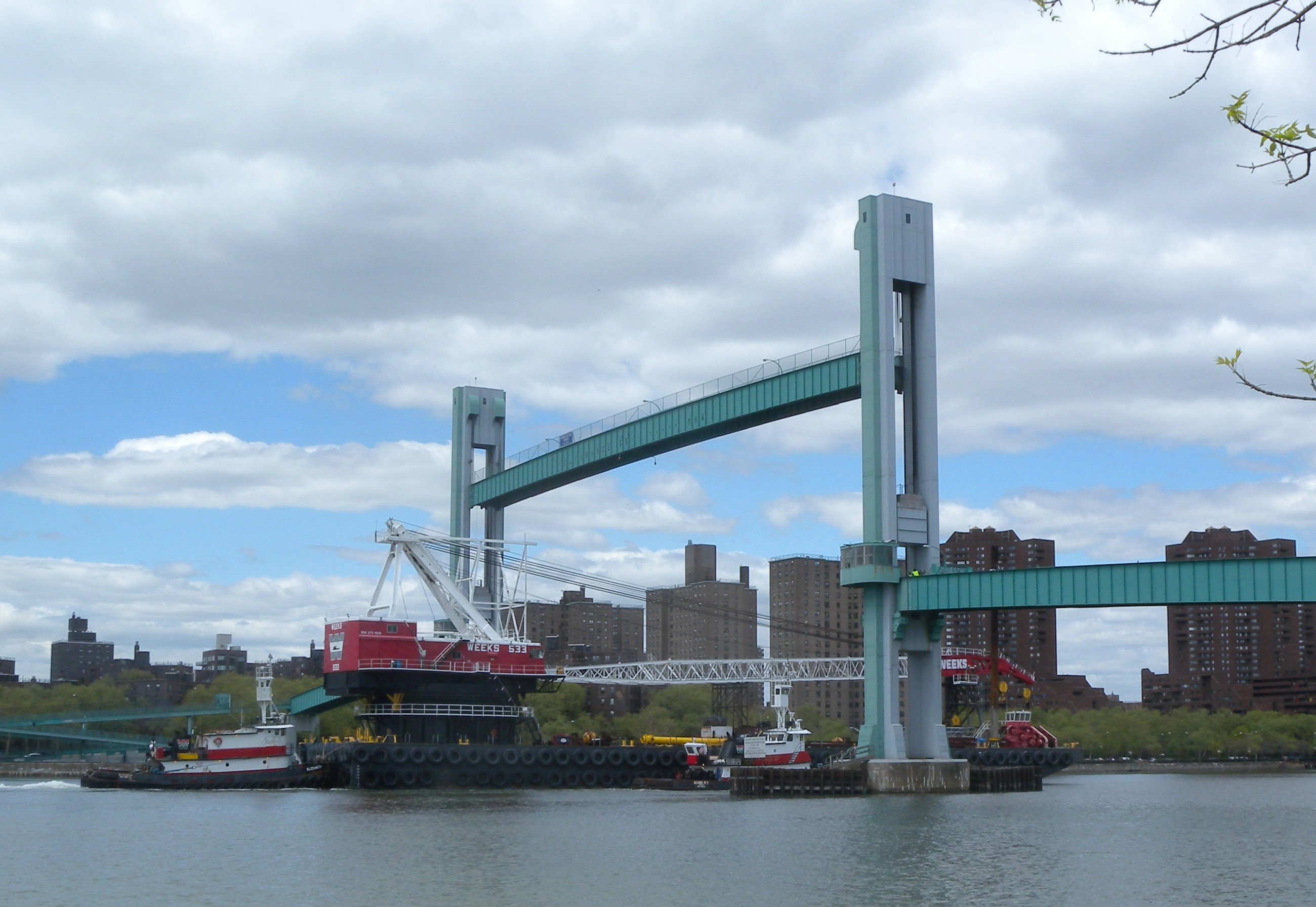
The Wards Island Bridge in New York City over the Harlem River

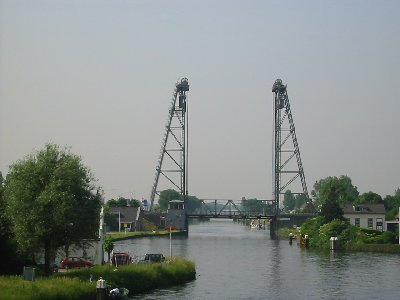
One of the vertical-lift bridges over the Gouwe River, built in 1930

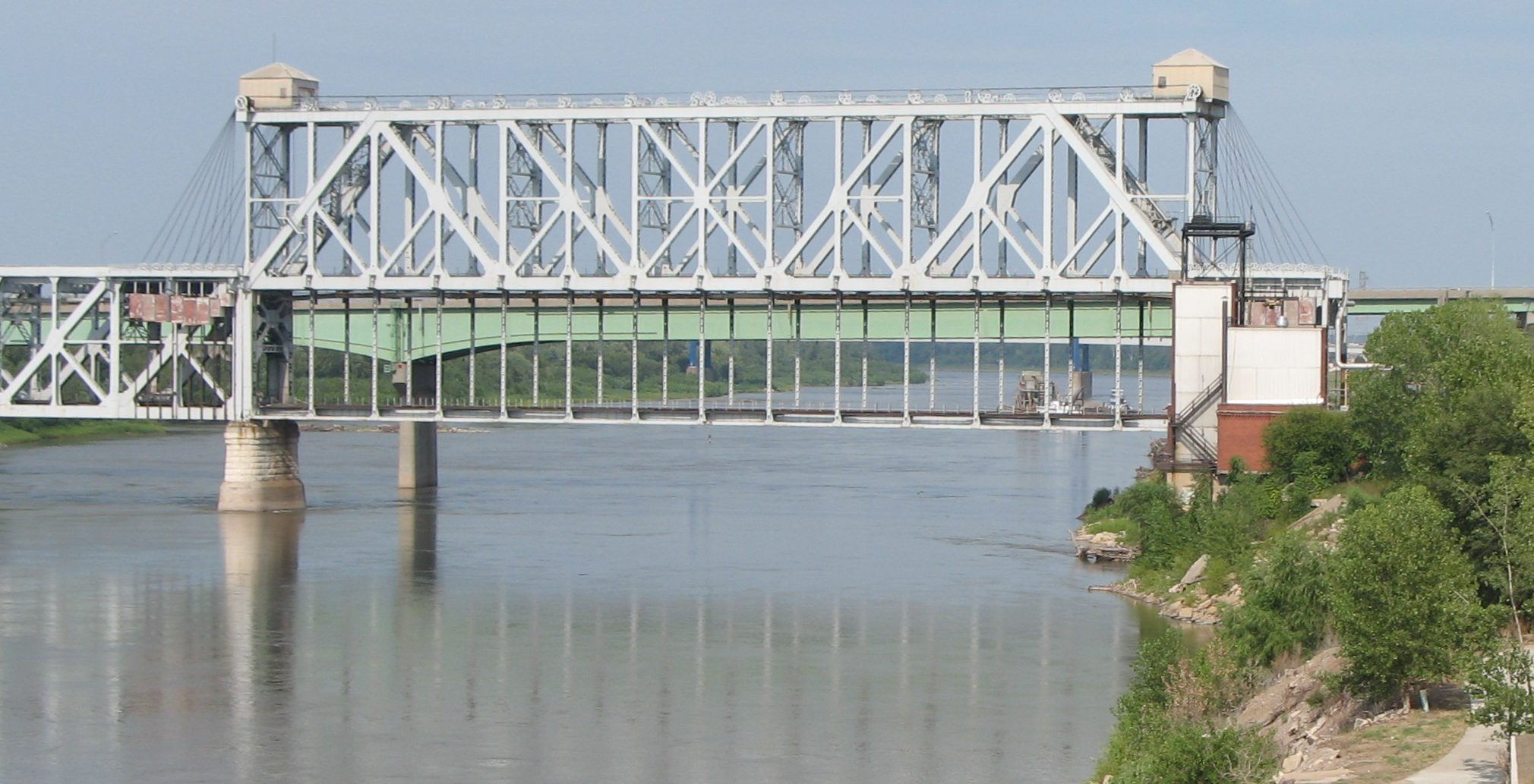
ASB Bridge in Kansas City, Missouri

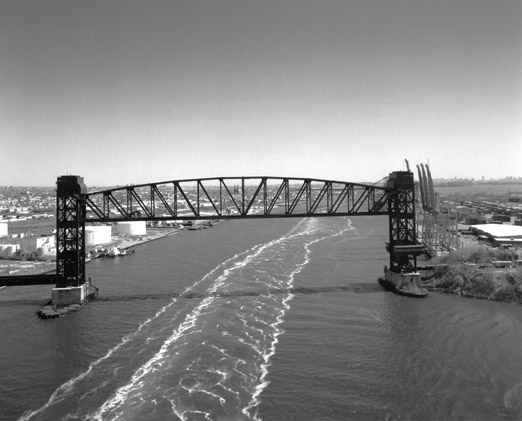
Arthur Kill Vertical Lift Bridge has the longest lift span of any vertical-lift bridge in the world

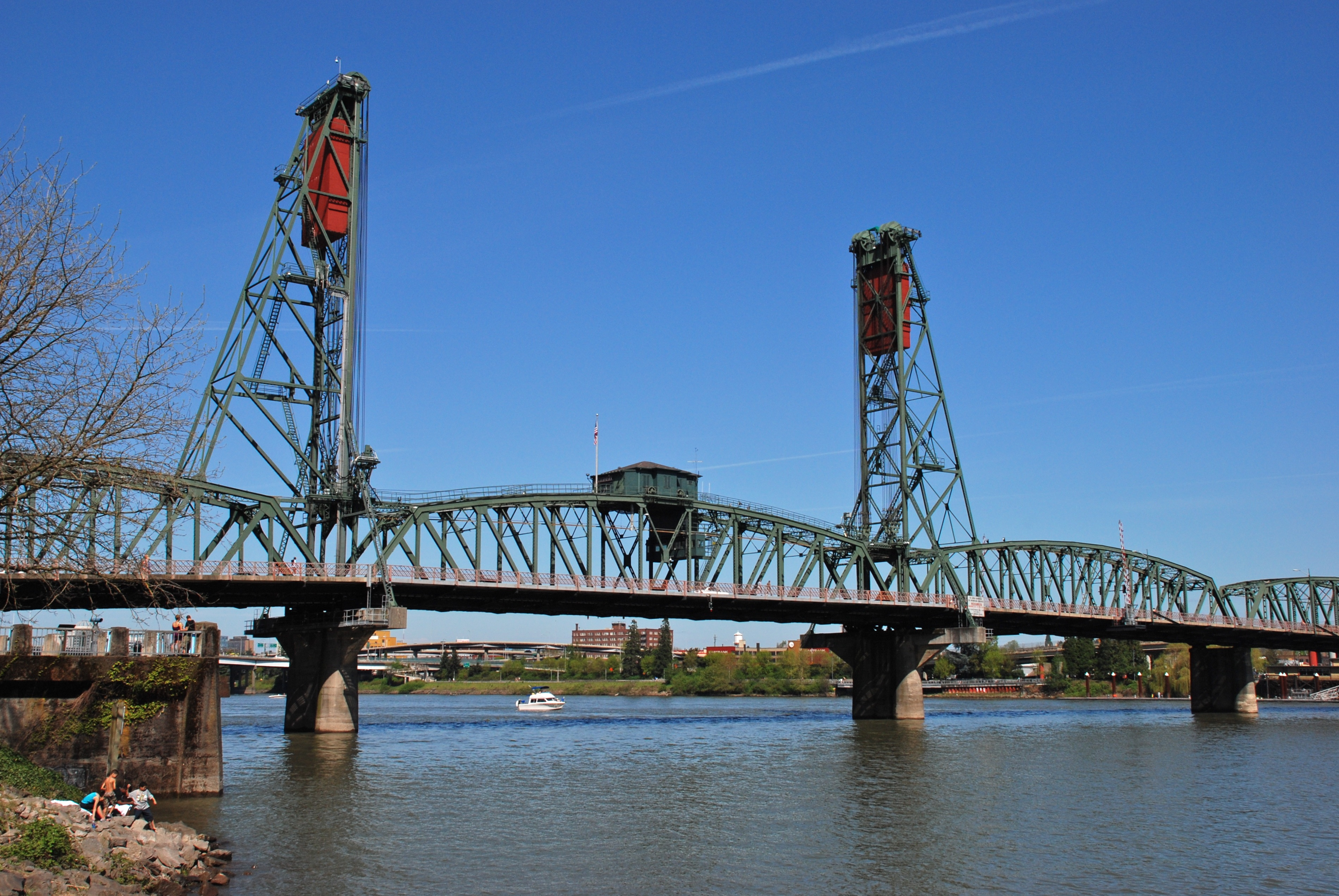
Hawthorne Bridge (in Portland, Oregon, U.S.), built in 1910, the oldest vertical-lift bridge in the United States

Clarence St. Bridge in Port Colborne, Ontario

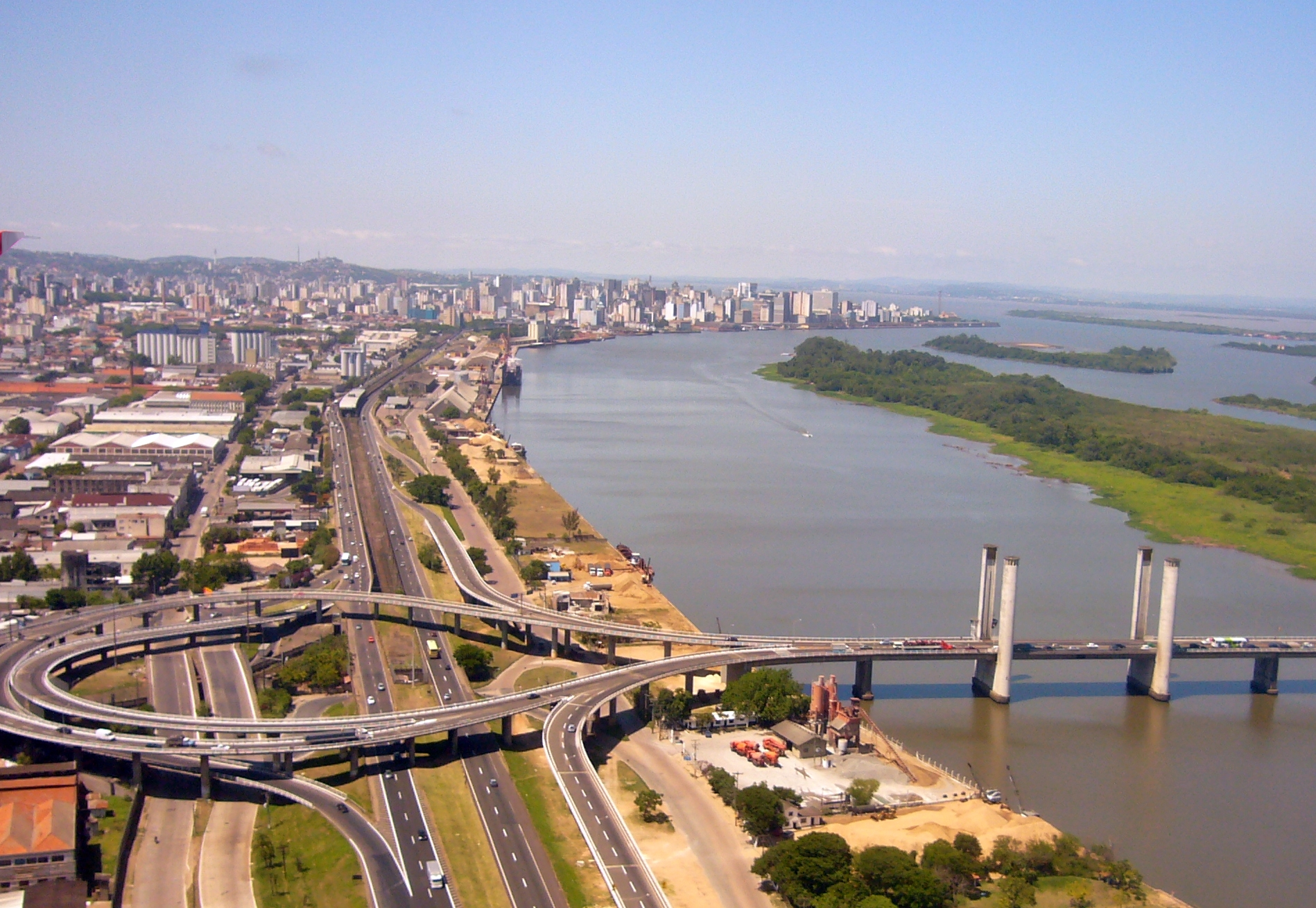
Guaiba Bridge, which crosses Lake Guaíba, in Porto Alegre, Brazil

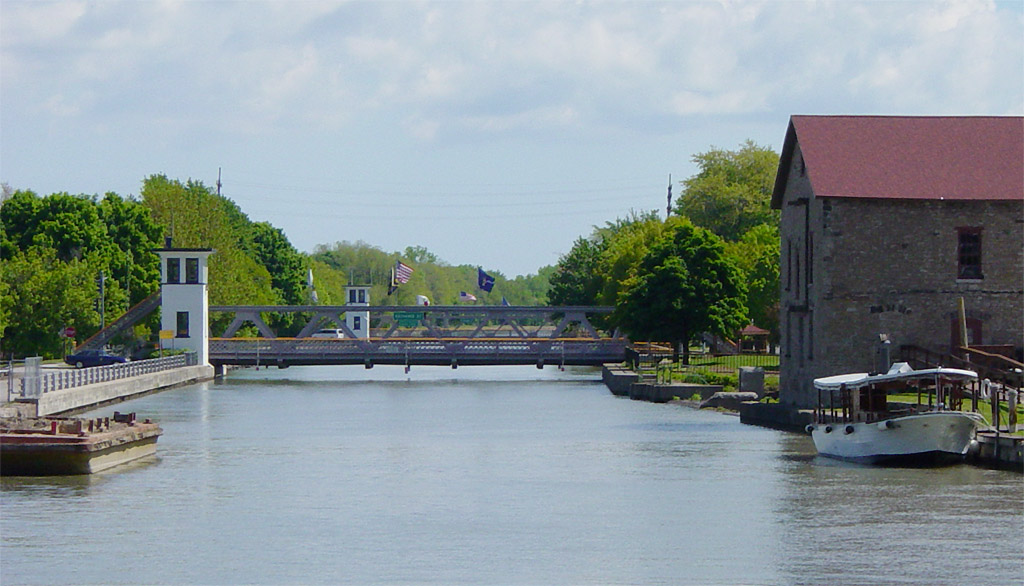
A lift bridge over the Erie Canal at Lockport, New York

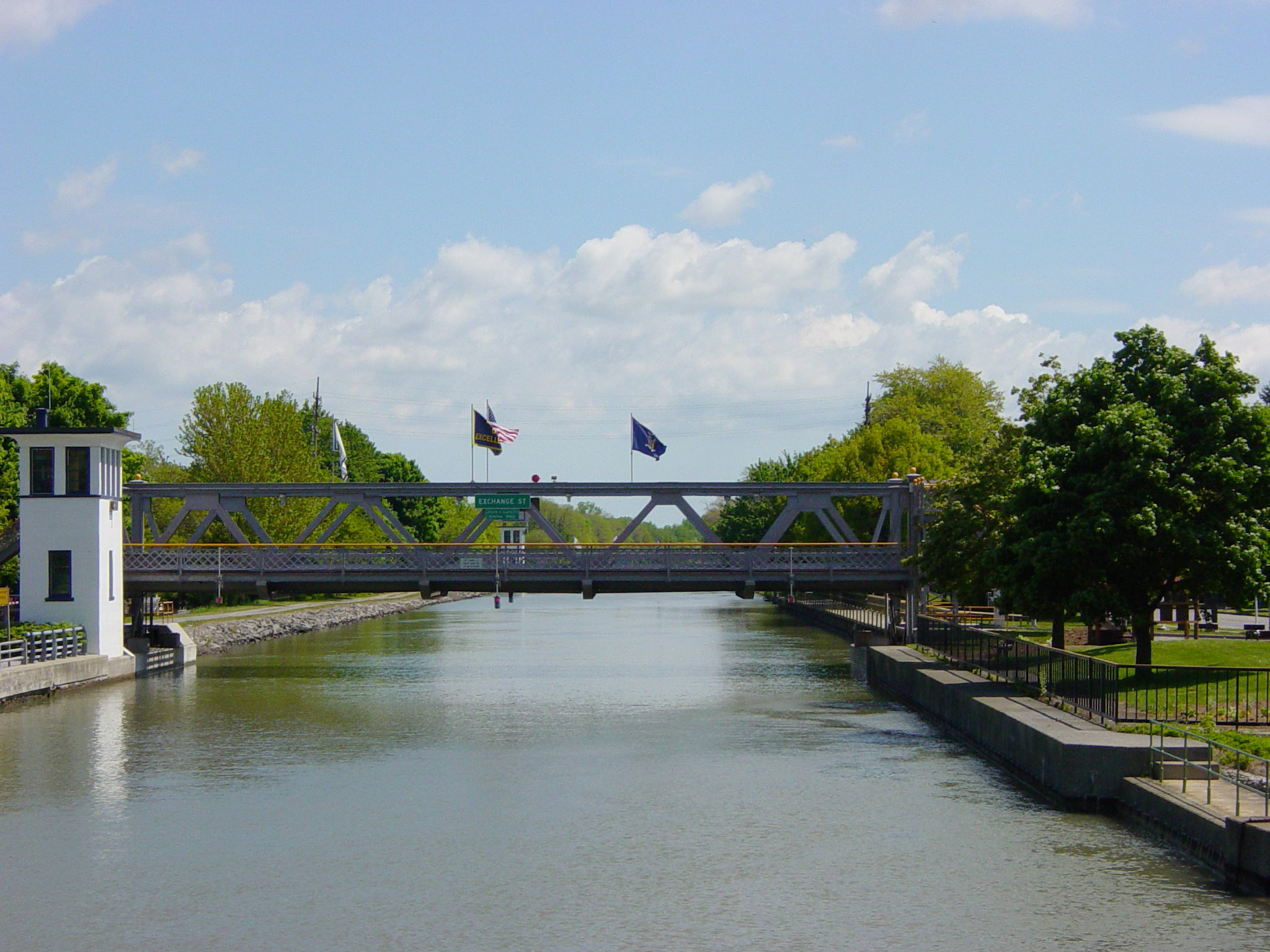
A lift bridge, elevated at both ends

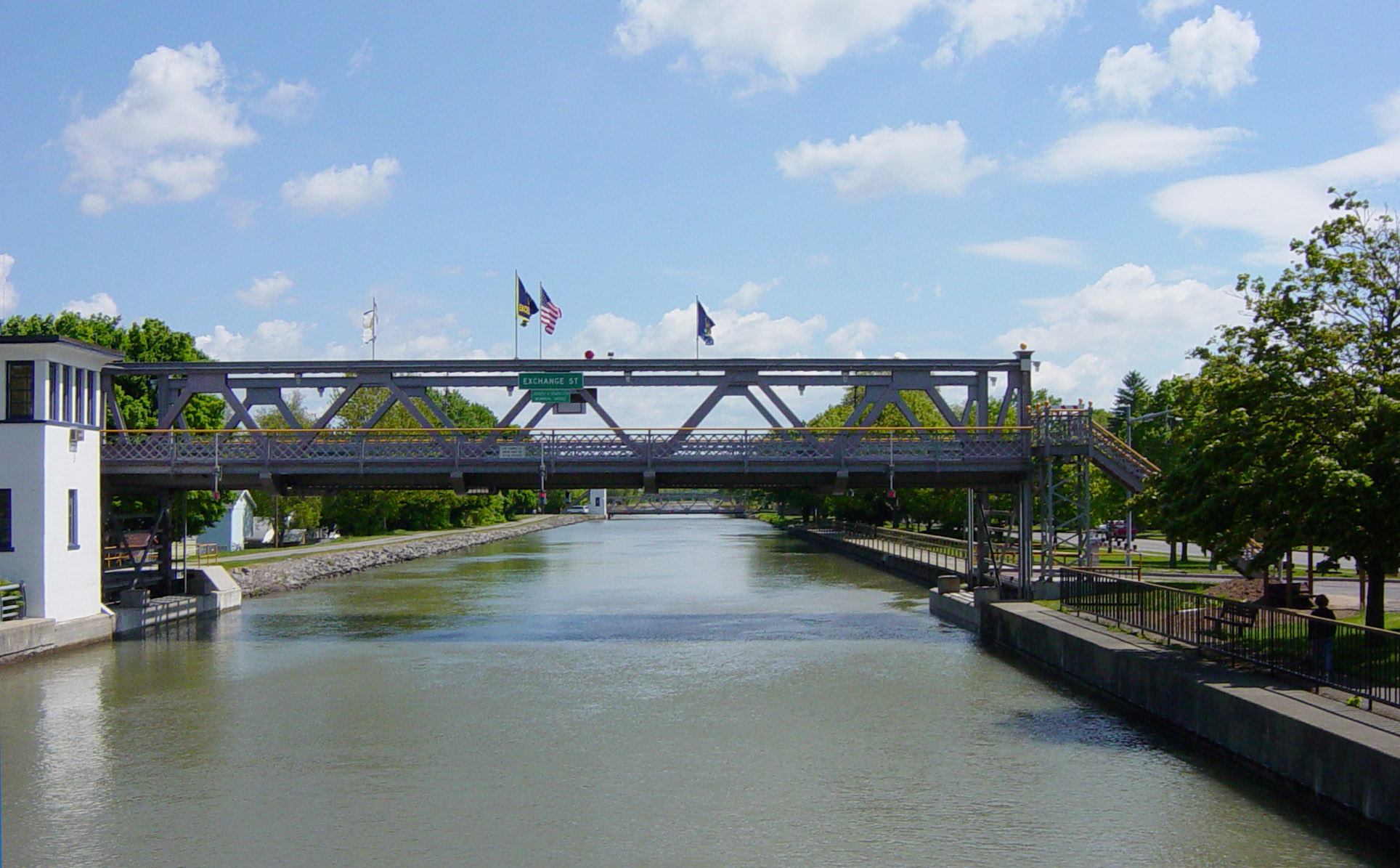
A lift bridge near its upward position, pedestrians may cross when it is raised by using stairways

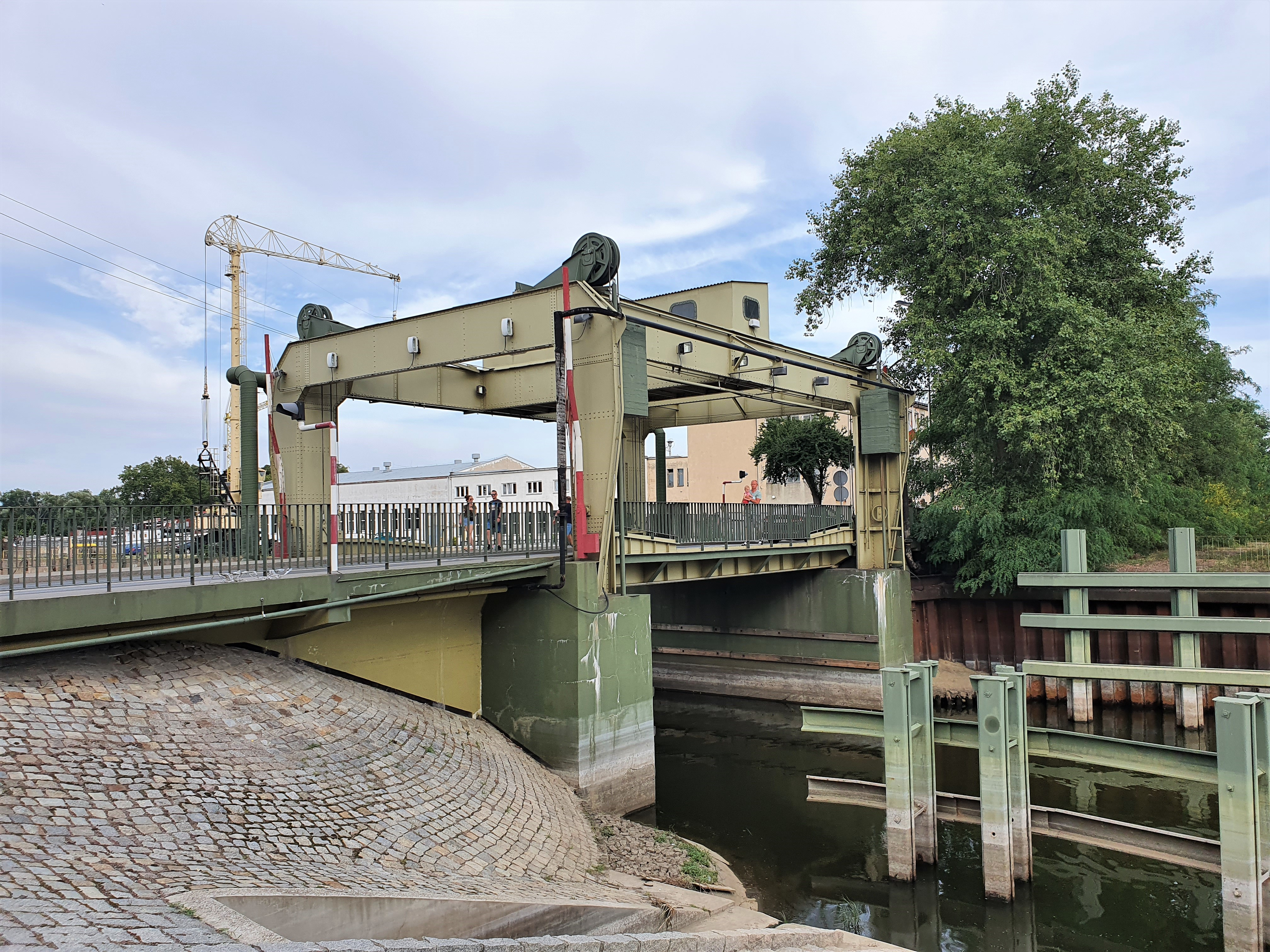
Small lift bridge in Nowa Sól, Poland

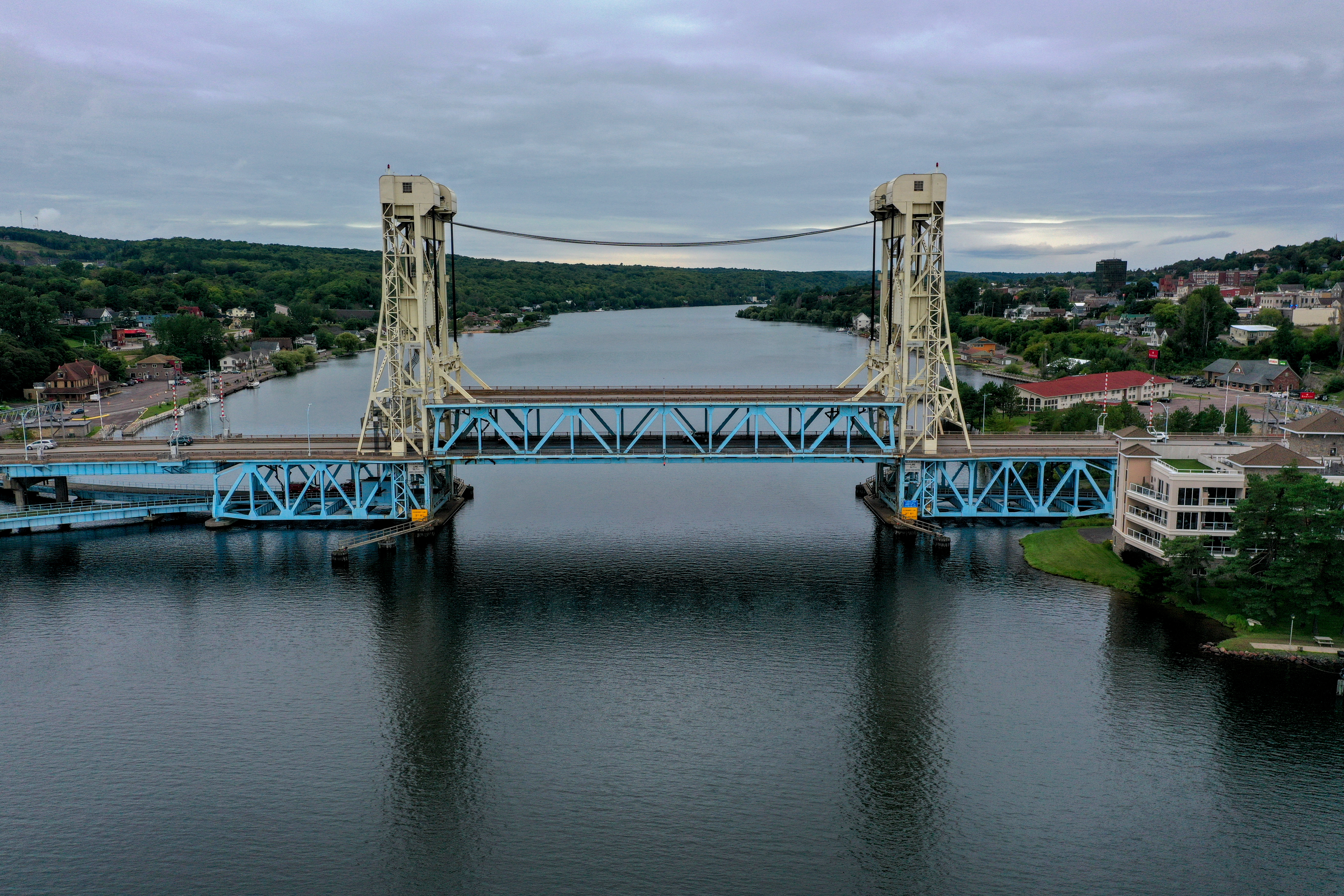
Portage Lake Lift Bridge linking Houghton, Michigan to Hancock, Michigan

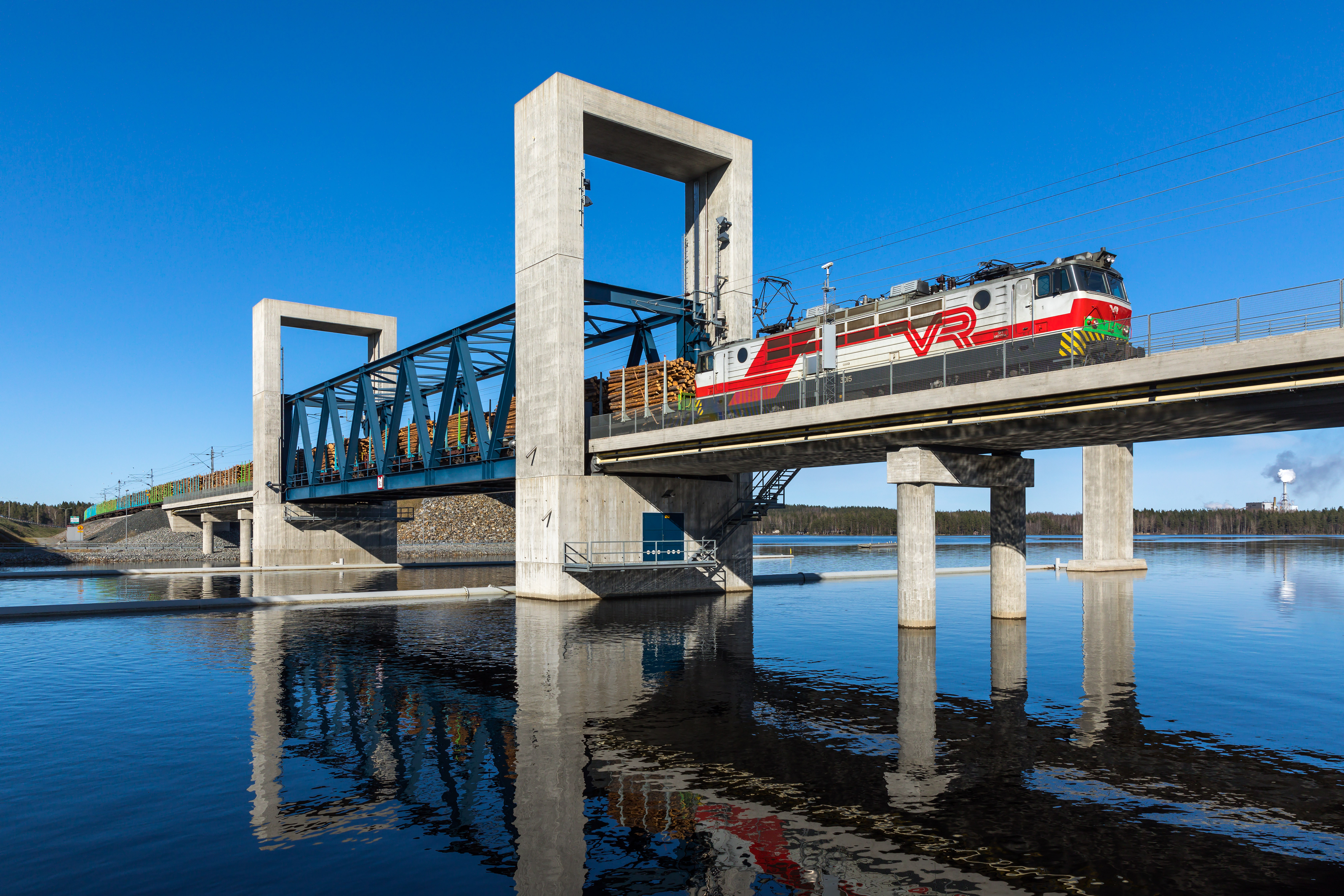
An Sr1 locomotive pulling lumber across a lift bridge north of Kuopio railway station in Finland

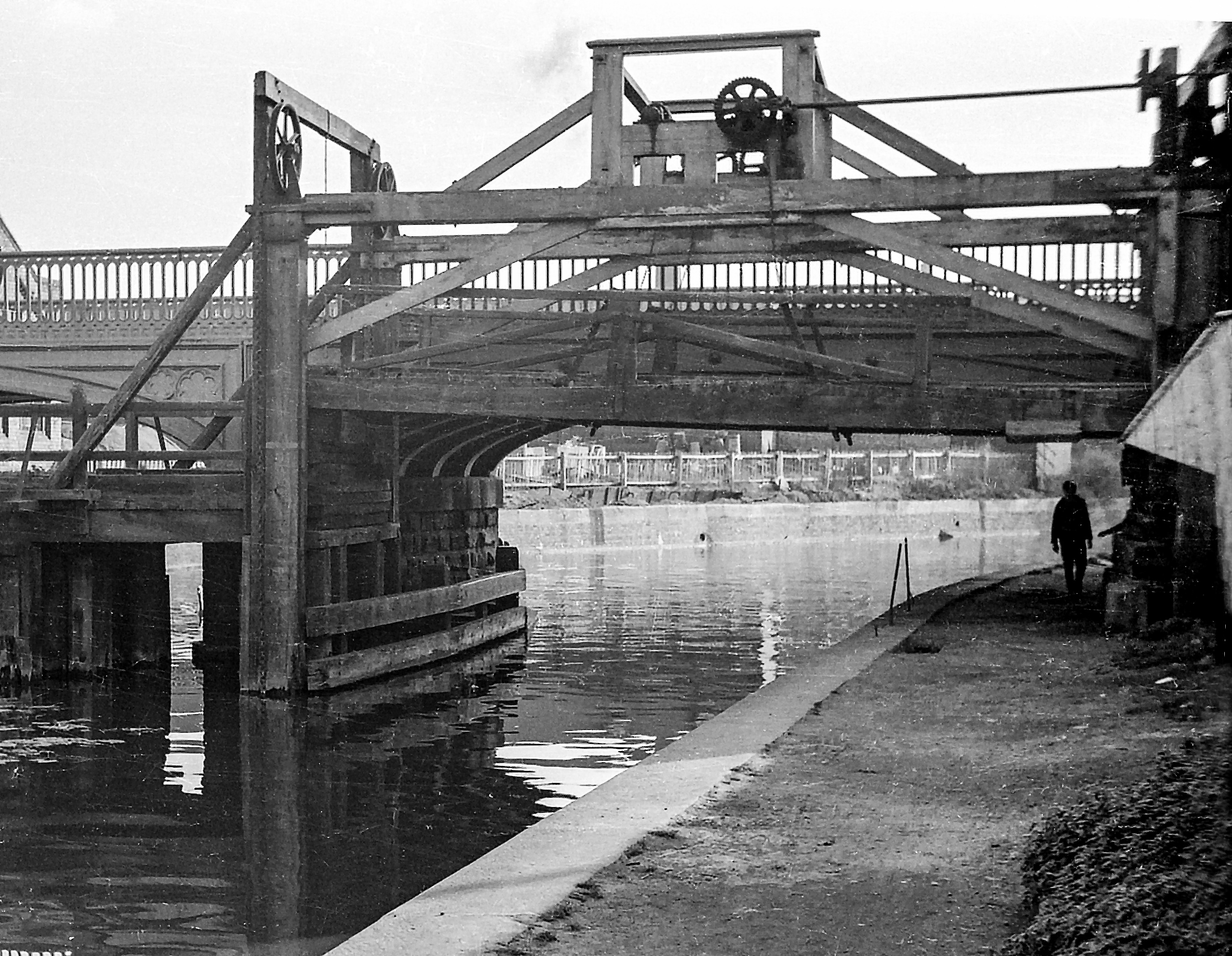
Railway lift bridge of 1834 on the Leicester and Swannington Railway, based on a design by Robert Stephenson, over the Grand Union Canal, Leicester, England, in 1965

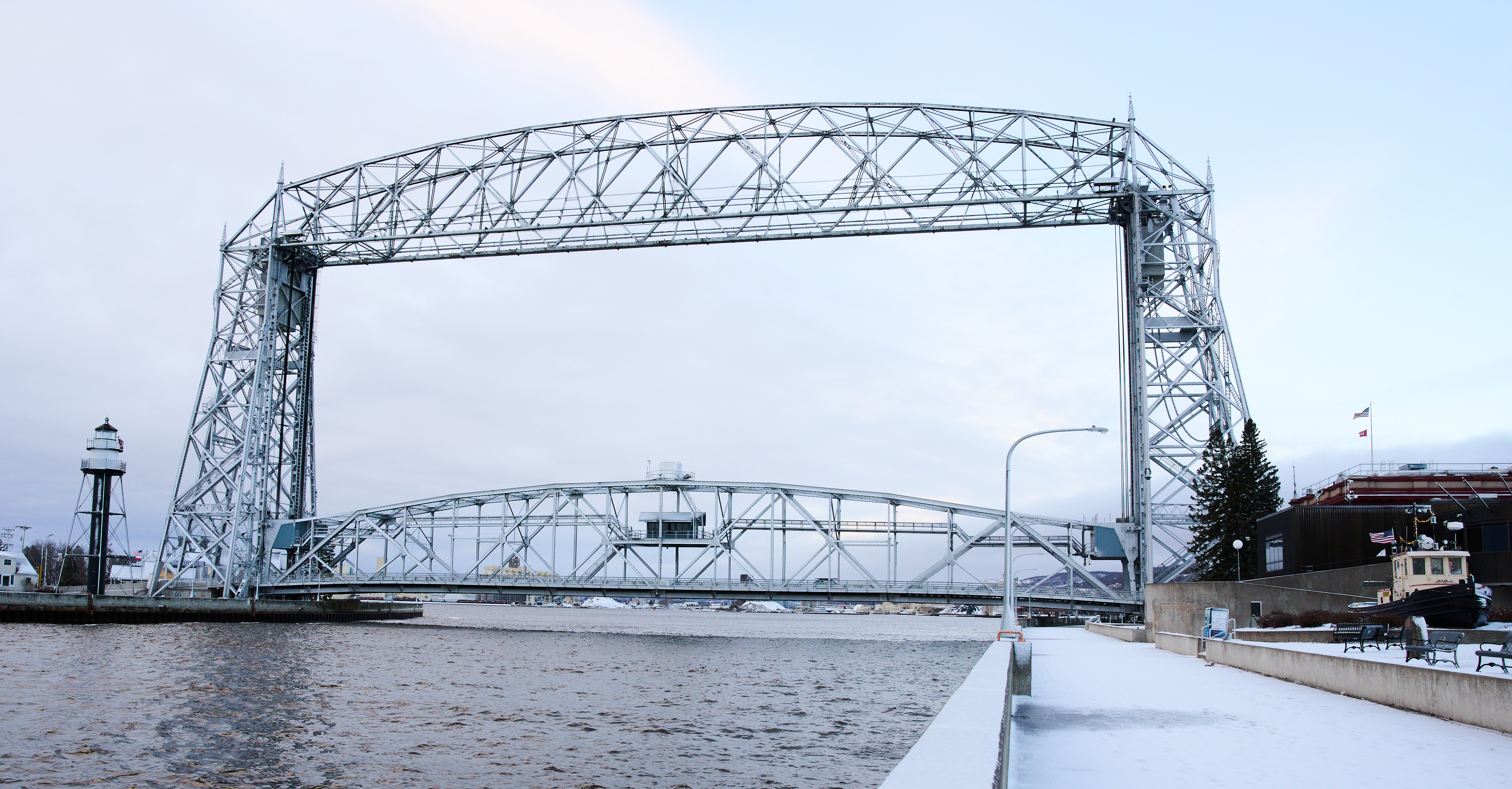
The Aerial Lift Bridge in the port city of Duluth, Minnesota is famous for its loud horn exchanges with passing ships.

== See also ==
- Moveable bridges for a list of other movable bridge types
- Submersible bridge for a similar disappearing bridge
- Table bridge for a vertical-lift bridge without visible lifting means
