= Moveable bridge =

Bridge that moves to allow passage, usually of watercraft

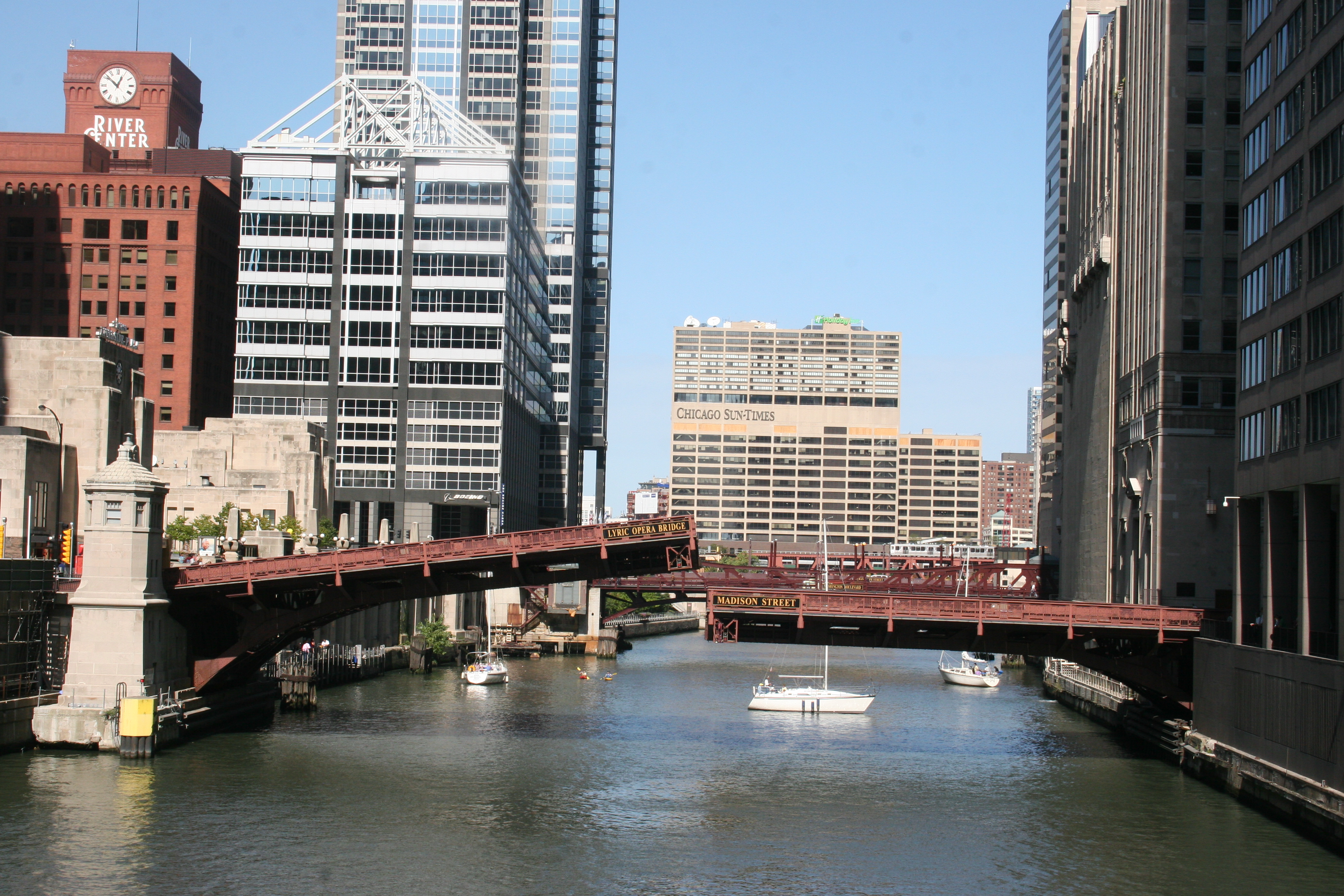
Madison Street Bridge, a bascule bridge over the Chicago River in Chicago, IL

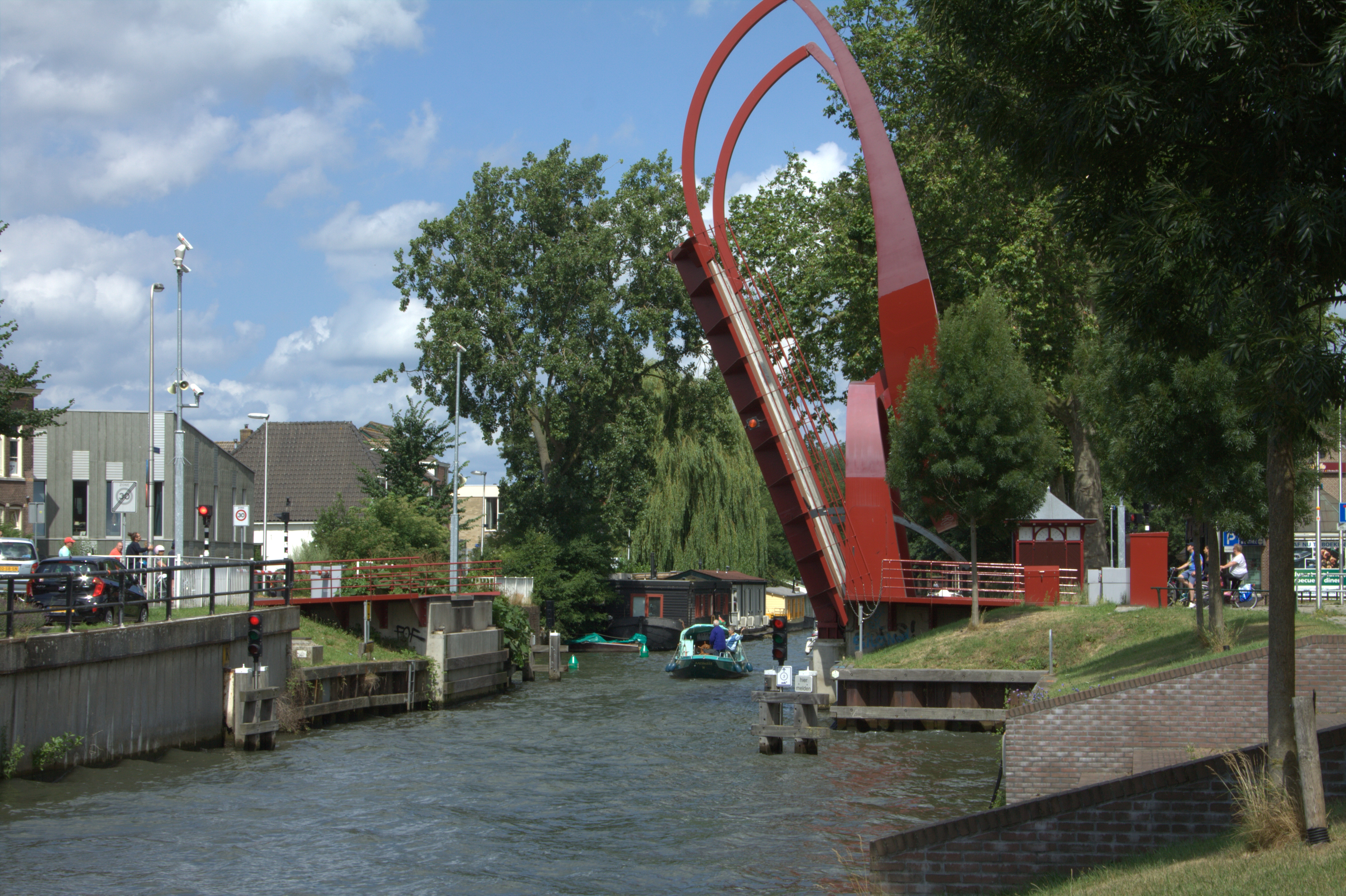
The Rode Brug (Red Bridge) across the Vecht river in Utrecht, Netherlands

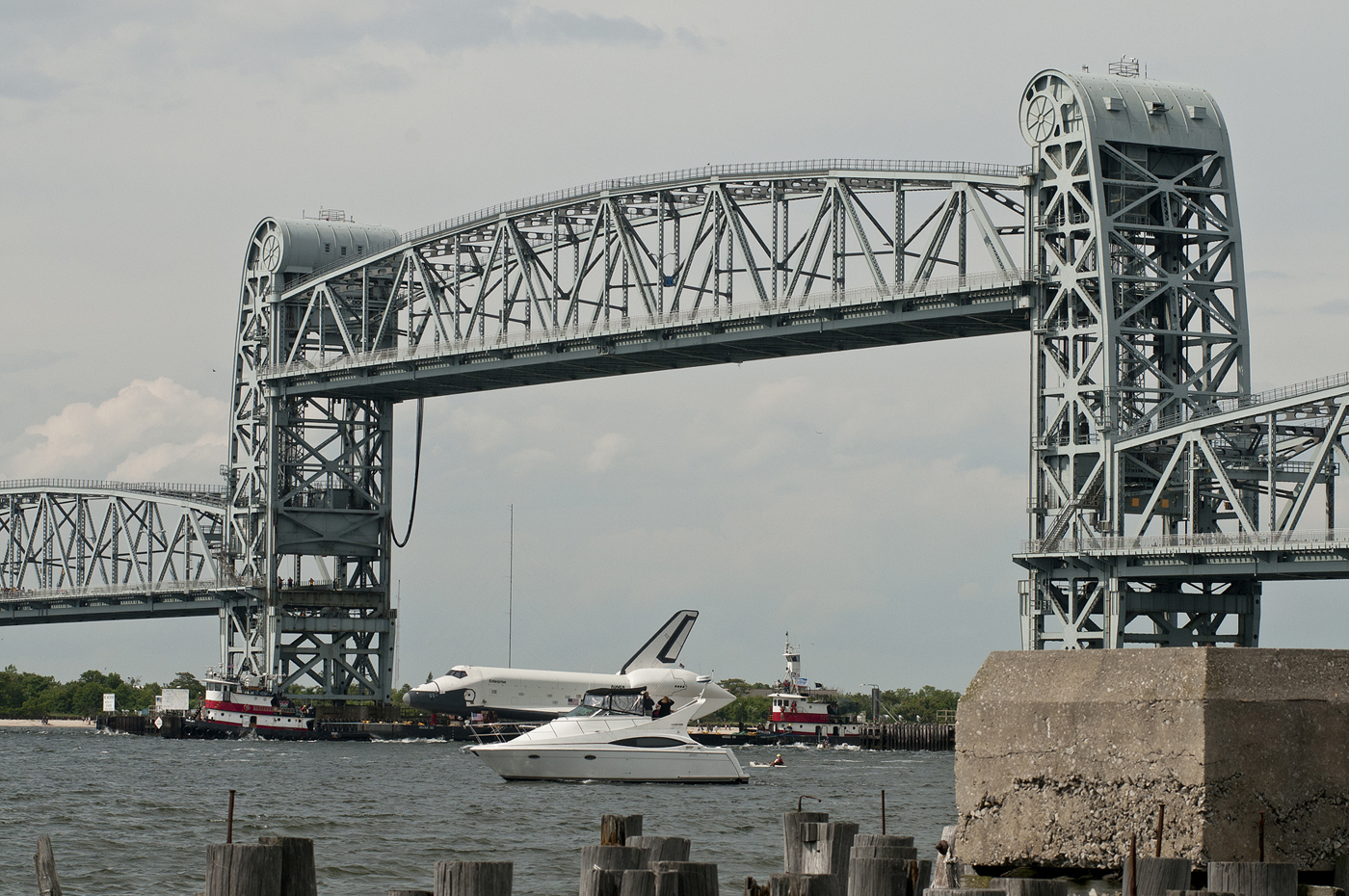
The Marine Parkway–Gil Hodges Memorial Bridge in New York City

A moveable bridge, or movable bridge, is a bridge that moves to allow passage for boats or barges. In American English, the term is synonymous with drawbridge, and the latter is the common term, but drawbridge can be limited to the narrower, historical definition used in some other forms of English, in which drawbridge refers to only a specific type of moveable bridge often found in castles.

An advantage of making bridges moveable is the lower cost, due to the absence of high piers and long approaches. The principal disadvantage is that the traffic on the bridge must be halted when it is opened for passage of traffic on the waterway. For seldom-used railroad bridges over busy channels, the bridge may be left open and then closed for train passages. For small bridges, bridge movement may be enabled without the need for an engine. Some bridges are operated by the users, especially those with a boat, others by a bridgeman (or bridge tender); a few are remotely controlled using video-cameras and loudspeakers. Generally, the bridges are powered by electric motors, whether operating winches, gearing, or hydraulic pistons. While moveable bridges in their entirety may be quite long, the length of the moveable portion is restricted by engineering and cost considerations to a few hundred feet.

There are often traffic lights for the road and water traffic, and moving barriers for the road traffic.

The Steel Bridge in Portland, Oregon is believed to be the only example of a double-deck bridge where both decks can be moved independently.

In the United States, regulations governing the operation of moveable bridges (referred to as drawbridges) – for example, hours of operation and how much advance notice must be given by water traffic – are listed in Title 33 of the Code of Federal Regulations; temporary deviations are published in the Coast Guard's Local Notice to Mariners.

== Types ==
Vertical motion

- Vertical-lift bridge – the bridge deck is lifted by counterweighted cables mounted on towers; road or rail
- Table bridge – a lift bridge with the lifting mechanism mounted underneath it
- Submersible bridge – also called a ducking bridge, the bridge deck is lowered into the water

Horizontal motion

- Retractable bridge (Thrust bridge) – the bridge deck is retracted to one side
- Vlotbrug, a design of retractable floating bridge in the Netherlands
- Guthrie rolling bridge
- Transporter bridge – a structure high above carries a suspended, ferry-like structure

Rotation about a vertical axis

- Swing bridge – the bridge deck rotates around a fixed point, usually at the centre, but may resemble a gate in its operation; road or rail

Rotation about a horizontal axis

- Bascule bridge – a drawbridge hinged on pins with a counterweight to facilitate raising; road or rail
  - Rolling bascule bridge – an unhinged drawbridge lifted by the rolling of a large gear segment along a horizontal rack
- Drawbridge (British English definition) – the bridge deck is hinged on one end
- Double-beam drawbridge
- Fan Bridge – a drawbridge with longitudinal divisions between multiple bascule sections that rise to various angles of elevation, forming a fan arrangement.
- Tilt bridge – the bridge deck, which is curved and pivoted at each end, is lifted at an angle

Other motions

- Folding bridge – a drawbridge with multiple sections that collapse together horizontally
- Curling bridge – a drawbridge with transverse divisions between multiple sections that curl vertically

By function

- Jet bridge – a passenger bridge to an airplane. One end is mobile with height, yaw, and tilt adjustments on the outboard end
- Linkspan – for a roll-on/roll-off vessel or ferry
- Ferry slip
- Locks are implicitly bridges as well allowing ship traffic to flow when open and at least foot traffic on top when closed

== Visual index ==
Drawbridge

Bascule bridge

Folding bridge

Curling bridge

Vertical-lift bridge

Table bridge

Retractable bridge (Thrust bridge)

Rolling bascule bridge

Submersible bridge

Tilt bridge

Swing bridge

Transporter bridge

== Accidents ==
- April 23, 1853 – Rancocas Creek, New Jersey: Engineer of the Camden & Amboy's 2 p.m. train out of Camden, New Jersey missed stop signals and ran his train off an open drawspan at Rancocas Creek. There were 27 fatalities.
- June 29, 1864 – St-Hilaire train disaster, Mont-St-Hilaire, Quebec, Canada: A Grand Trunk Railway passenger train failed to observe a red signal and ran through an open swing bridge over the Richelieu River. Ninety-nine were killed and 100 were injured.
- November 7, 1916 – Summer Street Bridge Disaster, Boston, Massachusetts: a streetcar loaded with passengers ran off an open drawbridge into Fort Point Channel near downtown Boston killing 46 passengers.
- September 15, 1958 – Newark Bay, New Jersey rail accident, Elizabethport, New Jersey: Central Railroad of New Jersey (CNJ) commuter train #3314 from Bay Head Junction to Jersey City ran a stop signal and an open derail protecting the Newark Bay 4-span lift bridge, and the train's two diesel locomotives and two of five passenger cars went into Newark Bay through one of the open spans. Four crewmen, including the engineer and fireman, and 44 passengers died by drowning.
- September 22, 1993 – Mobile, Alabama, US: In heavy fog and low visibility, a disoriented towboat pilot made a wrong turn and entered a non-navigable waterway. Due to inexperience and improper radar training, the pilot did not realize he was off-course and struck an unfinished swing bridge over the Big Bayou Canot around 2:45AM, knocking it out of alignment by approximately three feet (one meter), although his initial supposition in the low visibility was that one of the barges had run aground. The rails kinked but did not break, so no fault was indicated for approaching trains. Approximately 8 minutes later, an Amtrak train carrying 220 passengers derailed at the kinked portion of the rails, killing 47 and injuring 103 more.
- November 23, 1996 – Kearny, New Jersey, US: An Amtrak passenger and mail train derailed while crossing the Portal Bridge over the Hackensack River, sideswiping another passenger train in the process. Thirty-four people were injured. A broken rail joint on one pair of the bridge's movable rails at each end of the span caused a track misalignment, while still making electrical contact with the landward rails; thus signals were clear, derails closed, and a fault indication was not displayed.

== See also ==
- Bailey bridge, Medium Girder Bridge, and Armoured vehicle-launched bridge – transportable or relocatable bridges.
- Barton Swing Aqueduct, a swing bridge carrying barge traffic over a ship canal.
- List of movable bridges in Connecticut
- Lists of rail accidents
- Pontoon bridge – may be built with a barge or boat-like section that may be moved for passage.
