= Summer Street Bridge disaster =

1916 streeetcar accident in Boston. Massachusetts, US

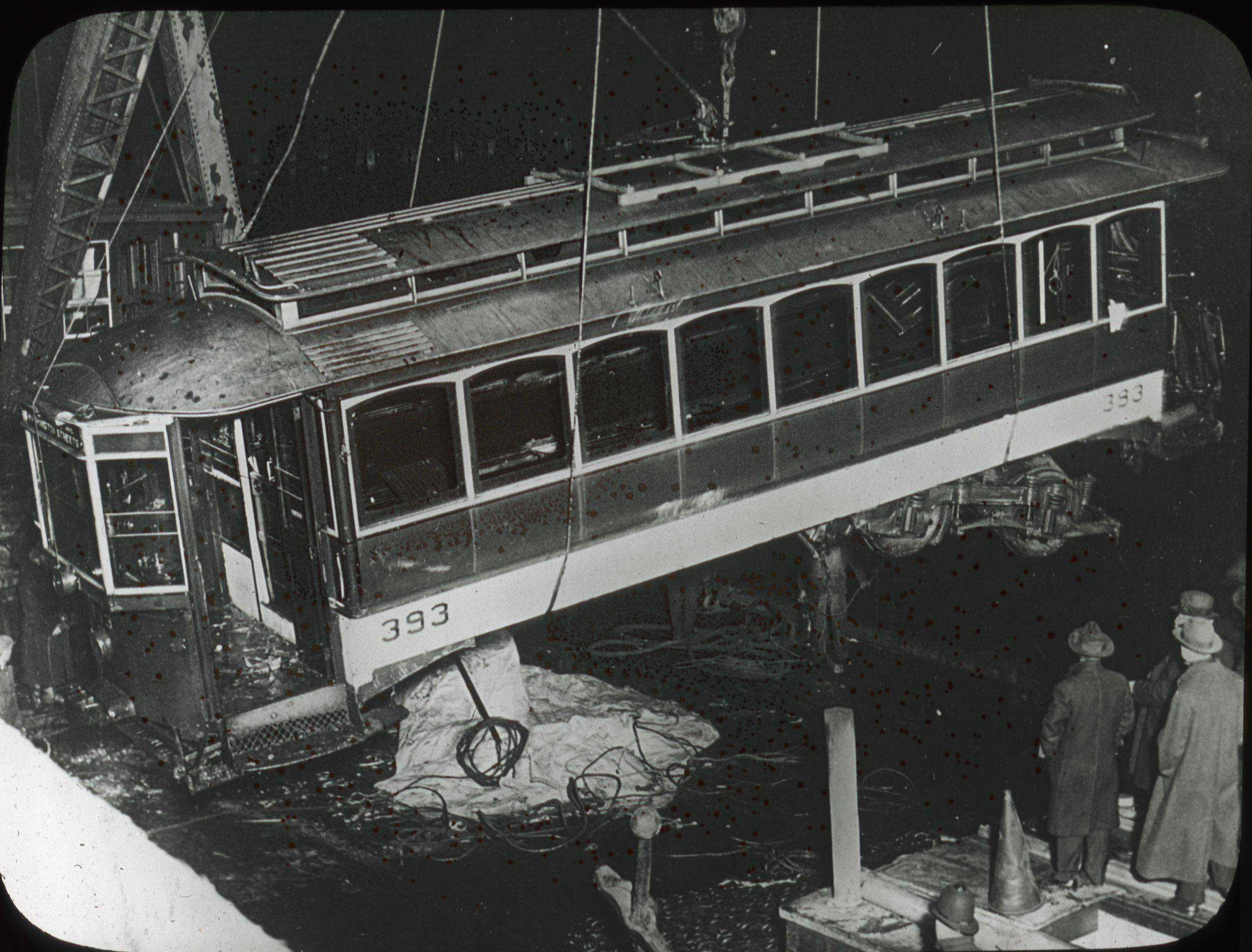
- The streetcar being raised from the river the next day

- Location within Boston Location within Massachusetts Location within the United States

Details
- Date: November 7, 1916; Around 5:25 p.m. ET (UTC-4)
- Location: Boston, Massachusetts
- Coordinates: 42°21′3.7″N 71°3′6.42″W
- Country: United States
- Line: City Point to Downtown
- Operator: Boston Elevated Railway
- Incident type: Overrun off moveable bridge
- Cause: Train driver error

Statistics
- Trains: 1
- Deaths: 46

On November 7, 1916, a streetcar loaded with passengers ran off the open Summer Street Bridge, a retractile bridge, into Fort Point Channel near downtown Boston, Massachusetts, United States. Forty-six passengers were killed, making it the deadliest disaster in Boston's history until surpassed by the Cocoanut Grove fire in 1942.

== Background ==
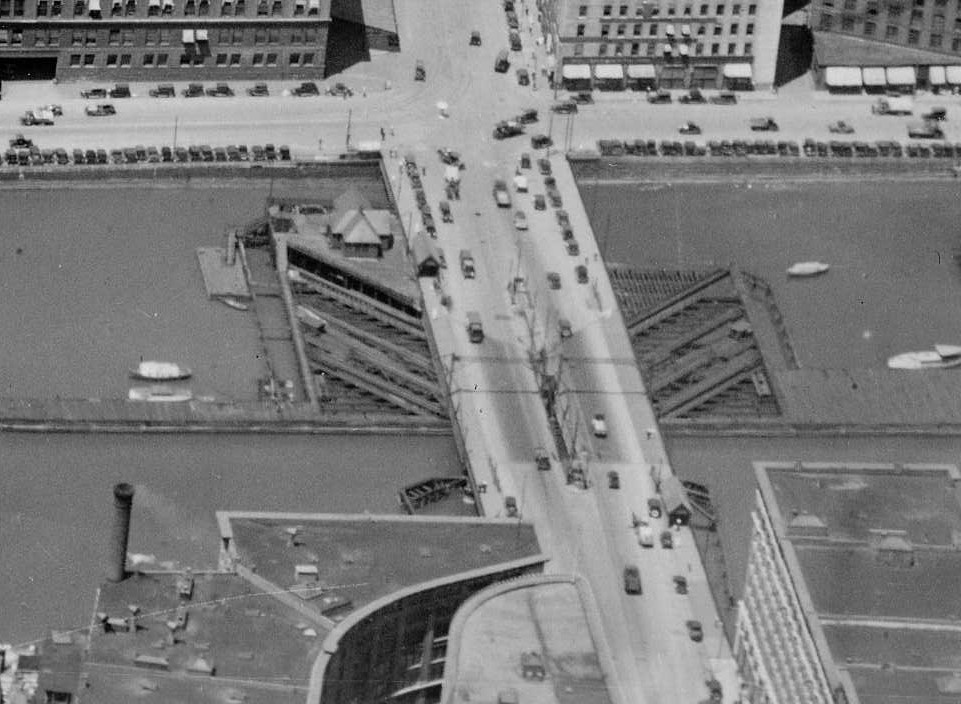
Summer Street Bridge in July 1925, showing the tracks that the retractable sections slid on

By 1916, the Boston Elevated Railway (BERy) operated all streetcar and rapid transit lines in Boston. Original plans had called for an elevated rapid transit loop line through South Boston; however, that line was never constructed. Instead, South Boston was served by a network of surface streetcar lines that connected to the rapid transit lines in downtown Boston.

The line from City Point to downtown Boston served many industrial workers who worked along East First Street and Summer Street in South Boston. It ran along Summer Street for most of its length, crossing the 1899-built Summer Street Bridge over Fort Point Channel to cross into downtown Boston. The retractable bridge has two sliding sections of roadway – one for inbound lanes, one for outbound – that can move away from the bridge at a 45-degree angle to create a channel for ships to pass.

== Incident ==
At 5:13 pm on November 7, 1916, Car #393 began an inbound run from City Point with motorman Gerald Walsh at the controls. The car was an extra, operated to fill a gap between scheduled service. Walsh had not worked the City Point route before, nor had the conductor George McKeon, but both were familiar with the area. Car #393 was a typical 1900-built 25-foot (7.6 m) streetcar, a workhorse of the BERy fleet of the day. As it approached the Summer Street Bridge, it was full with around sixty passengers on board.

The bridge was in the midst of opening to allow a ship to pass; the inbound roadway was already slid to its furthest position. Walsh failed to obey a small stop sign located at Melcher Street, though he slowed for a boarding passenger. Walsh noticed the open bridge too late to stop; the wheels locked and the streetcar crashed through a set of metal gates and into the channel. Heavy with passengers, it sank quickly into the cold waters of the channel, some 30 feet (9.1 m) deep.

Walsh, McKeon, and around fifteen passengers managed to escape the car and were rescued by tugboats and passing pedestrians. Forty-six passengers drowned, many still inside the crowded streetcar.

== Aftermath ==
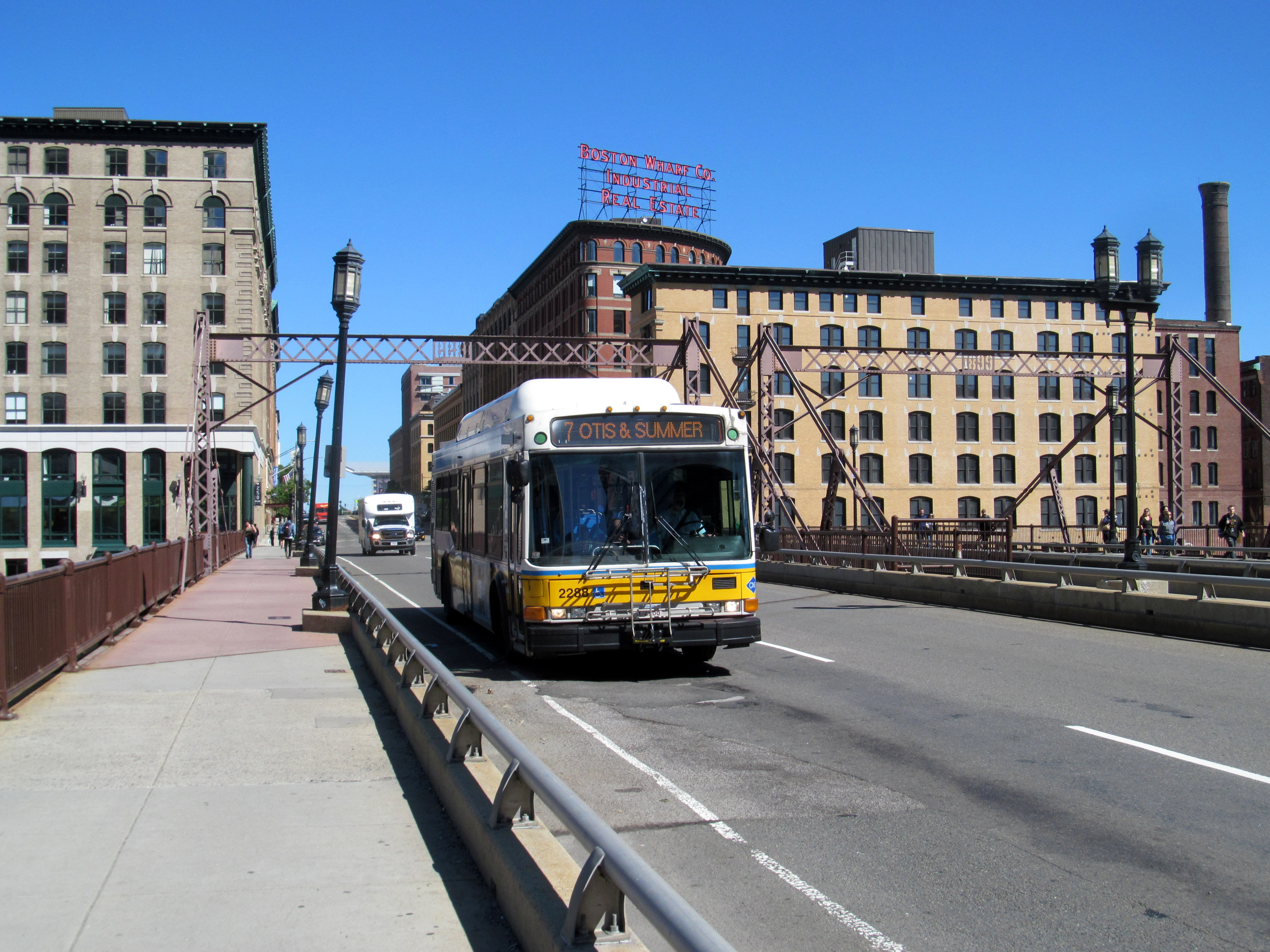
An MBTA route 7 bus – the descendant of the streetcar route run in 1916 – on the bridge in 2017

Divers from the Hugh Nawn company began work at 9 pm; bodies were removed from the wreckage from 10 pm to 12:40 am. Forty-five bodies were discovered in the channel and the sunken streetcar; the forty-sixth victim was found in the channel in May 1917. Boston newspapers, each vying for the best story, reported body counts as high as 60. The streetcar was removed from the channel at 3:30 am by a crane on the wrecking lighter Admiral.

Boston's Public Service Commission ruled the accident to be the fault of Walsh for failing to stop at the posted sign, but noted that such signs were hard to notice and that many drawbridges lacked them entirely. Walsh went on trial for manslaughter in October 1917, with witnesses differing on many aspects of the accident. The bridge tenders claimed the required red lantern had been hung on the gate to warn streetcars of the open bridge, but Walsh claimed he saw no such lantern. Some questioned how the glass lantern had survived the impact of the trolley with the gates, which broke a 4-inch-thick (10 cm) iron post in two; they alleged that the bridge tenders may have actually hung it after the accident. Walsh was declared not guilty, but he never ran a streetcar again and died around 1932 at age 41. McKeon died during World War I combat in France in July 1918.

The disaster was the first major accident involving the BERy. It remained the worst in Boston for many years; the more famous Boston Molasses Disaster in 1919 had less than half the fatalities. It was only surpassed in 1942, when the Cocoanut Grove fire killed nearly 500 people.

Car #393 was returned to service but most operators refused to run it; it was converted to a work car and later scrapped. The streetcar route was converted to bus on June 20, 1953. After several reroutings between 1968 and 2005, the modern MBTA route 7 bus follows largely the same route as the streetcar involved in the disaster.

== See also ==
- List of bridge disasters
- List of disasters in Massachusetts by death toll
