= List of bridges and tunnels in New York City =

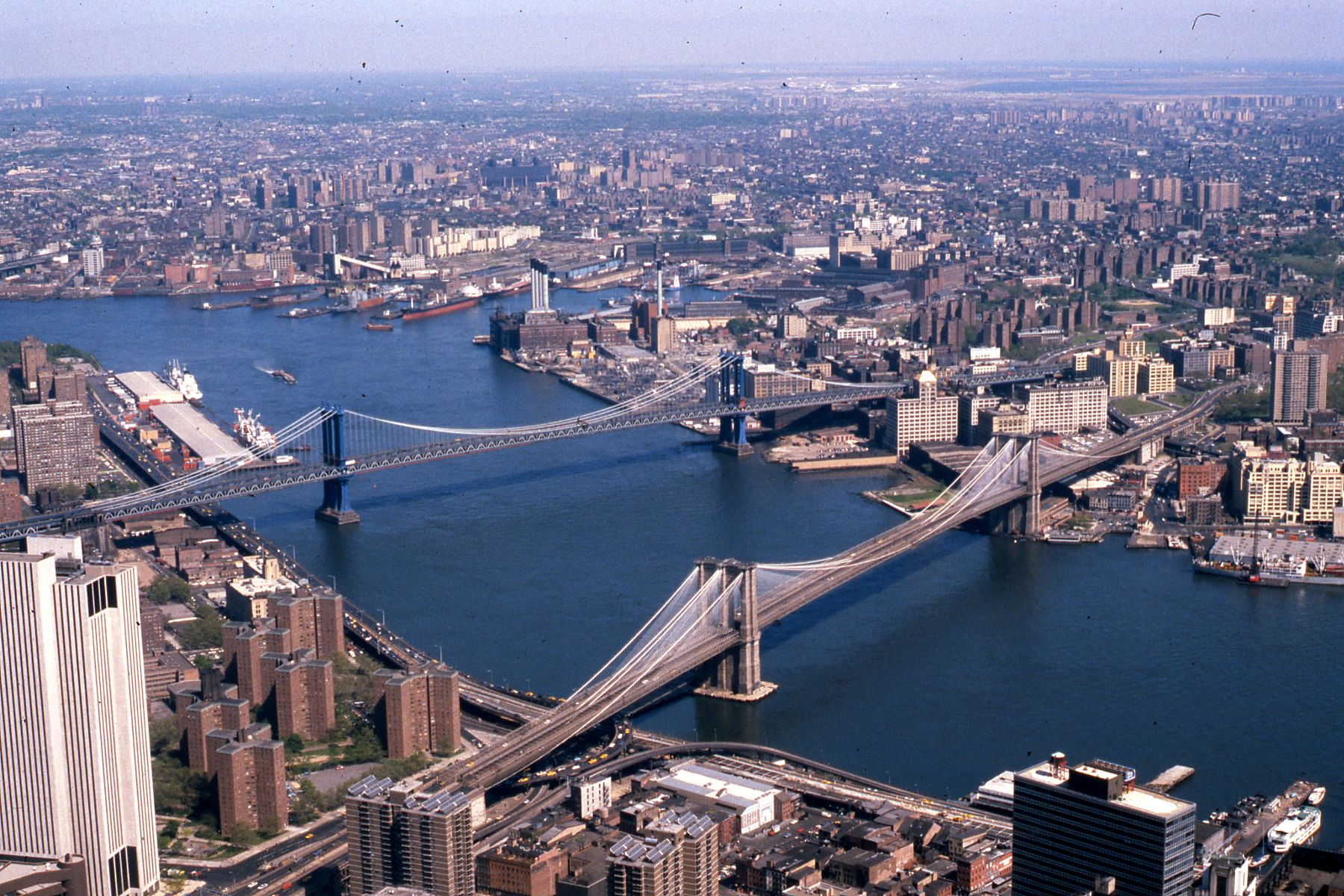
The Manhattan Bridge and Brooklyn Bridge on the East River in 1981

New York City is home to 789 bridges and tunnels.

Several agencies manage this network of crossings. The New York City Department of Transportation owns and operates almost 800. The Metropolitan Transportation Authority, Port Authority of New York and New Jersey, New York State Department of Transportation and Amtrak have many others.

Many of the city's major bridges and tunnels have broken or set records. Opened in 1927, the Holland Tunnel was the world's first mechanically ventilated underwater vehicular tunnel. The Brooklyn Bridge, Williamsburg Bridge, George Washington Bridge, and Verrazzano–Narrows Bridge were the world's longest suspension bridges when opened in 1883, 1903, 1931, and 1964 respectively.

== Bridges ==
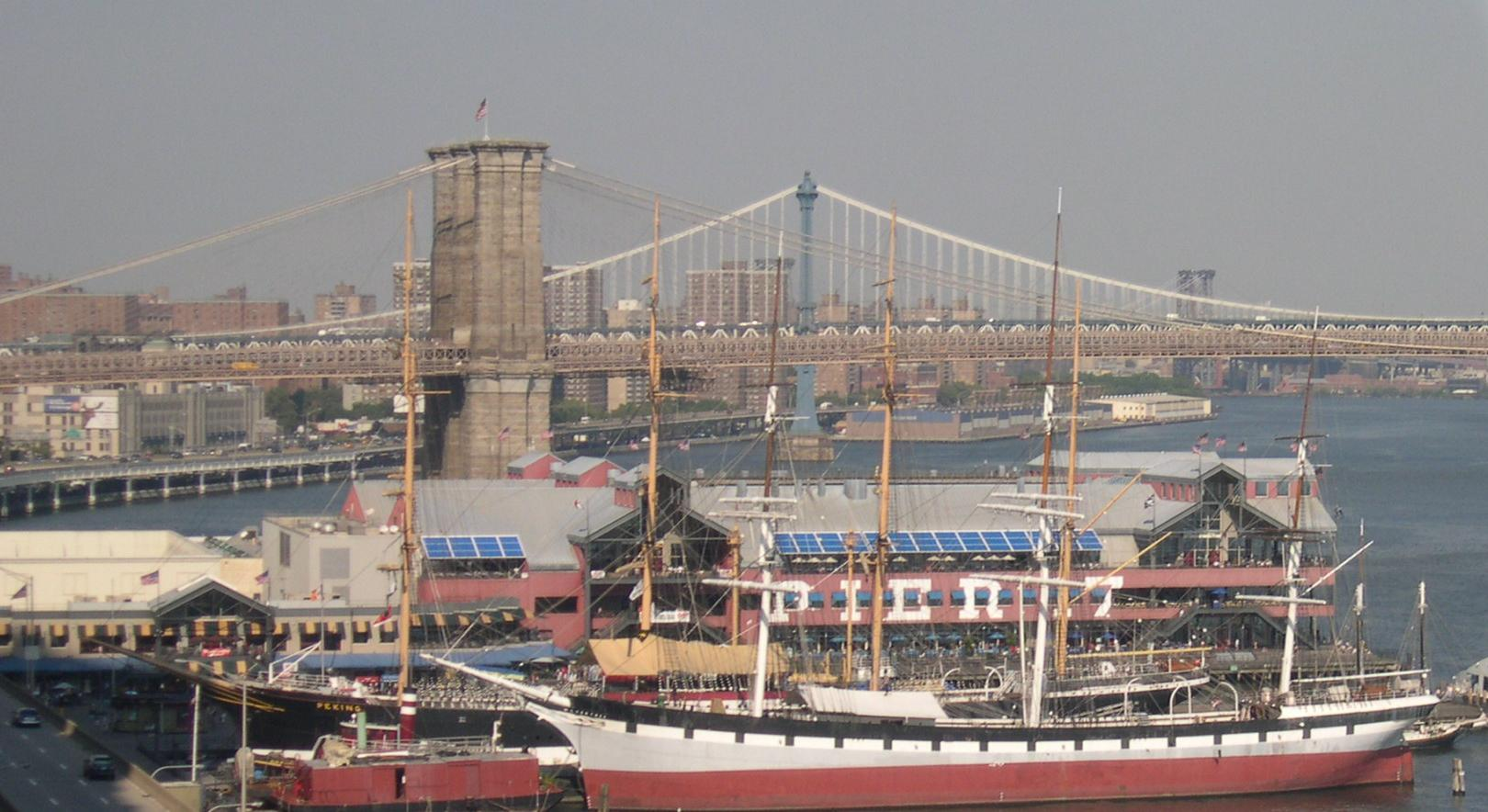
South Street Seaport, with Brooklyn Bridge, Manhattan Bridge, and Williamsburg Bridge visible in background

New York City's water crossings date back to 1693, when its first bridge, known as the King's Bridge, was constructed over Spuyten Duyvil Creek between Manhattan and the Bronx, located in the present-day Kingsbridge neighborhood. The bridge, composed of stone abutments and a timber deck, was demolished in 1917. The oldest crossing still standing is High Bridge, built in 1848. This bridge carried the water of the Croton Aqueduct over the Harlem River to the city as part of the Croton Aqueduct system.

Ten bridges and one tunnel serving the city have been awarded some level of landmark status. The Holland Tunnel was designated a National Historic Landmark in 1993 in recognition of its pioneering role as the first mechanically ventilated vehicular underwater tunnel, operating since 1927. The George Washington, High, Hell Gate, Queensboro, Brooklyn, Manhattan, Macombs Dam, Carroll Street, University Heights, and Washington Bridges have all received landmark status, as well.

New York features bridges of many lengths and types, carrying vehicular, bicycle, pedestrian, and subway traffic. The George Washington Bridge, spanning the Hudson River between New York City and Fort Lee, New Jersey, is the world's busiest bridge in terms of vehicular traffic. The George Washington, Verrazzano–Narrows, and Brooklyn Bridges are noted for their architecture, while others are more well known for their functional importance, such as the Williamsburg Bridge with 8 vehicular lanes, 2 subway tracks, a bike lane, and pedestrian walkways.

=== Bridges by body of water ===
==== East River ====
From south to north:

Name	Opening year	Length		Carries	Toll		Maintained by	Notes	Image
Name	Opening year	feet	meters	Carries	Cash	E-Z Pass	Maintained by	Notes	Image
Brooklyn Bridge	1883	5,988	1,825	5 lanes of roadway (2 Manhattan-bound, 3 Brooklyn-bound)	None		NYCDOT	Oldest suspension bridge in NYC. Also oldest suspension/cable-stayed hybrid bridge.	Brooklyn Bridge
Manhattan Bridge	1909	6,854	2,089	7 lanes of roadway and trains	None		NYCDOT	Double-decker bridge with 5 westbound lanes and 2 eastbound lanes. 3 of the westbound lanes and the subway are below the other 4 lanes.	
Williamsburg Bridge	1903	7,308.0	2,227.48	8 lanes of roadway (4 in each direction) and trains	None		NYCDOT		
Queensboro Bridge	1909	3,724	1,135	9 lanes of NY 25 (Queens Boulevard)	None		NYCDOT	Officially known as the Ed Koch Queensboro Bridge. Also known as 59th Street Bridge. Reversible 4 lanes on the upper deck, and 2 westbound/3 eastbound lanes on the lower deck.	
Roosevelt Island Bridge	1955	2,877.0	876.91	2 lanes of roadway (1 in each direction)	None		NYCDOT	East channel only	
Triborough Bridge (Suspension Bridge)	1936	2,790	850	8 lanes of I-278 (4 in each direction)	$12.03	$7.46	MTA Bridges and Tunnels	Officially known as the Robert F. Kennedy Bridge	
Hell Gate Bridge	1916	1,020	310	3 rail tracks (2 of Northeast Corridor, 1 of New York Connecting Railroad)	None		Amtrak		
Rikers Island Bridge	1966	4,200.0	1,280.16	2 lanes of roadway	None		NYCDOT	Only connects Rikers Island to Queens	
Bronx–Whitestone Bridge	1939	3,770.0	1,149.10	6 lanes of I-678 (Whitestone Expressway)	$12.03	$7.46	MTA Bridges and Tunnels		
Throgs Neck Bridge	1961	2,910.0	886.97	6 lanes of I-295 (Throgs Neck Expressway)	$12.03	$7.46	MTA Bridges and Tunnels		

==== Harlem River ====
From south to north, east to west:

Name	Opening year	Length		Carries	Toll		Maintained by	Notes	Image
Name	Opening year	feet	meters	Carries	Cash	E-Z Pass	Maintained by	Notes	Image
Wards Island Bridge	1951	937	285.6	Pedestrians and bicycles only	None		NYCDOT		
Triborough Bridge (Vertical-Lift Bridge)	1936	750	230	2 lanes of exit ramp from F.D.R. Drive	$12.03	$7.46	MTA Bridges and Tunnels	Officially known as the Robert F. Kennedy Bridge	
Willis Avenue Bridge	1901	3,212	979	4 lanes of roadway	None		NYCDOT	Northbound traffic only	
Third Avenue Bridge	1898	2,800.0	853.44	5 lanes of roadway	None		NYCDOT	Southbound traffic only	
Harlem River Lift Bridge	1956	330	100	4 tracks of Metro-North	None		MTA Metro-North Railroad		
Madison Avenue Bridge	1910	1,893	577	4 lanes of roadway	None		NYCDOT		
145th Street Bridge	1905	1,604	489	4 lanes of roadway	None		NYCDOT		
Macombs Dam Bridge	1895	2,539	774	4 lanes of roadway	None		NYCDOT		
High Bridge	1848	2,000	600	Pedestrian walkway and bicycle lanes	None		NYC Parks	Oldest surviving bridge in New York City	
Alexander Hamilton Bridge	1963	2,375	724	8 lanes of I-95 and US 1	None		NYSDOT		
Washington Bridge	1888	2,375	723.9	6 lanes of roadway	None		NYCDOT		
University Heights Bridge	1908	269	82	2 lanes of roadway	None		NYCDOT		
Broadway Bridge	1962	558.0	170.08	4 lanes of Broadway/ US 9 and the train	None		NYCDOT	Also known as Harlem Ship Canal Bridge	
Henry Hudson Bridge	1936	2,208	673	6 lanes of NY 9A / Henry Hudson Parkway	$8.87	$3.42	MTA Bridges and Tunnels	Double-decked bridge	
Spuyten Duyvil Bridge	1899	610	186	1 track of Empire Corridor	None		Amtrak	Swing bridge	

==== Hudson River ====
Name	Opening year	Length		Carries	Toll		Maintained by	Comments	Photo
Name	Opening year	feet	meters	Carries	Cash	E-ZPass	Maintained by	Comments	Photo
George Washington Bridge	1931	4,760.0	1,450.85	14 lanes of I-95 / US 1 / US 9 / US 46	$23.30	$16.79	PANYNJ	Double-deck, 8 lanes on upper level, 6 lanes on lower level. 7 lanes in each direction. Tolls collected in eastbound direction only.	George Washington Bridge

==== New York Bay ====
Name	Opening year	Length		Carries	Toll		Maintained by	Comments	Photo
Name	Opening year	feet	meters	Carries	Cash	E-ZPass	Maintained by	Comments	Photo
Verrazzano–Narrows Bridge	1964	13,701	4,176	13 lanes of I-278	$12.03	$7.46	MTA Bridges and Tunnels	Double-deck, 7 lanes on upper level; 3 in each direction and 1 reversible HOV 3+ lane. 6 lanes on lower level; three in each direction.	Verrazzano–Narrows Bridge

==== Arthur Kill ====
Name	Opening year	Length	Carries	Toll		Maintained by	Comments
Name	Opening year	Length	Carries	Cash	E-Z Pass	Maintained by	Comments
Goethals Bridge	2018	2225.04 m	6 lanes of I-278	$23.30	$16.79	PANYNJ	Replaced the old Goethals Bridge (completed 1928); the two new spans are a cable-stayed design. Tolls collected in the eastbound direction only
Arthur Kill Vertical Lift Bridge	1959	170.08 m	CSX and M&E rail lines	None		Conrail	
Outerbridge Crossing	1928	3093 m	4 lanes of Route 440; NY 440	$23.30	$16.79	PANYNJ	Tolls collected in the eastbound direction only.

==== Kill Van Kull ====
Name	Opening year	Length	Carries	Toll		Maintained by	Comments
Name	Opening year	Length	Carries	Cash	E-Z Pass	Maintained by	Comments
Bayonne Bridge	1931	1761.74 m	4 lanes of NY 440; Route 440	$23.30	$16.79	PANYNJ	Raised and rebuilt in 2019. Tolls collected in the southbound direction only

==== Newtown Creek ====
Name	Opening year	Length		Carries	Toll	Maintained by	Comments	Image
Name	Opening year	feet	meters	Carries	Toll	Maintained by	Comments	Image
Kosciuszko Bridge	2017, 2019	6,020	1,835	6 lanes of I-278	None	NYSDOT	Eastbound span opened in April 2017, and westbound span opened in August 2019. It replaces the original bridge	
Pulaski Bridge	1954	2,820	860	6 lanes of McGuinness Boulevard	None	NYCDOT	Drawbridge	
Greenpoint Avenue Bridge	1987	180	55	4 lanes of Greenpoint Avenue	None	NYCDOT	a.k.a. J. J. Byrne Memorial Bridge; Drawbridge	
Grand Street Bridge	1903	227	69.2	1 lane of Grand Avenue	None	NYCDOT	Swing bridge; one-lane bridge	
Metropolitan Avenue Bridge	1933	111	33.8	4 lanes of Grand Street and Metropolitan Avenue	None	NYCDOT	Drawbridge; Crosses English Kills, a tributary of Newtown Creek	

=== Other ===
==== The Bronx ====
Name	Opening year	Length	Carries	Comments
Bronx Kill
Robert F. Kennedy Bridge	1936	1,610 feet (490 m)	8 lanes of I-278	Formerly known as the Triborough Bridge
Hutchinson River (heading downriver)
Eastchester Bridge	1926	0.4 miles	4 lanes of Boston Road ( US 1)	
I-95 bridge	1961	5,280 feet	6 lanes of I-95	
Hutchinson River Parkway Bridge	1941	673 feet (205 m)	6 lanes of Hutchinson River Parkway	Drawbridge
Pelham Bay Bridge	1908	81 feet (25 m)	Northeast Corridor (Amtrak)	Also called Amtrak Pelham Bay Bridge
Pelham Bridge	1908	892 feet (272 m)	4 lanes of Shore Road	Drawbridge
Westchester Creek
Unionport Bridge	1953	526 feet (160.3 m)	7 lanes of I-278 (Bruckner Boulevard) / I-95	
Bronx River
Eastern Boulevard Bridge	1953	634 feet (193.2 m)	I-278	Drawbridge
Eastchester Bay
City Island Bridge	1901	950 feet (290 m)	3 lanes of City Island Avenue	

==== Brooklyn ====
Name	Opening year	Length	Carries	Comments	Image
Gowanus Canal
Union Street Bridge	1905	600 feet	2 lanes of Union Street	Drawbridge	
Carroll Street Bridge	1889	300 feet	2 lanes of Carroll Street	New York City Designated Landmark and one of four retractable bridges in the country	The Carroll Street Bridge in Gowanus, Brooklyn
Third Street Bridge	1905	350 feet	Third Street		
Ninth Street Bridge	1999	700 feet	Ninth Street	Vertical Lift Bridge	Ninth Street Bridge, spanning Gowanus Canal in Brooklyn
Culver Viaduct	1933	0.6 miles	trains	passes over the Ninth Street Bridge, carrying 4 tracks, 2 express and 2 local	Ninth Street Bridge, spanning Gowanus Canal in Brooklyn
Hamilton Avenue Bridge	1942	0.7 miles	Hamilton Avenue	passes under the Gowanus Expressway and carries four lanes of traffic in each direction	A view facing west from the edge of the Hamilton Ave bride in Brooklyn, with the Gowanus expressway above
Gowanus Expressway	1941		9 lanes of I-278 (Gowanus Expressway)		
Mill Basin
Mill Basin Bridge	2017		6 lanes of Belt Parkway	The bridge has a combined bicycle and pedestrian pathway on the eastbound side of the bridge which carries the Jamaica Bay Greenway	
Mill Basin Drawbridge (demolished)	1940	825 ft	6 lanes of Belt Parkway	Twin-leaf bascule bridge; demolished in 2018 and replaced by Mill Basin Bridge	
Rockaway Inlet (Brooklyn and Queens)
Marine Parkway–Gil Hodges Memorial Bridge	1937	1226 m	4 lanes of Flatbush Avenue	also has a narrow combined bicycle and pedestrian path on the southbound side of the bridge	

==== Queens ====
Name	Opening year	Length	Carries	Comments	Image
Dutch Kills
Borden Avenue Bridge	1908	100 feet	2 lanes of Borden Avenue	One of four retractable bridges in the country	Borden Avenue, Long Island City
Hunters Point Avenue Bridge	1910	500 feet	Hunters Point Avenue		
Cabin M Bridge			1 track of the Montauk Cutoff	There is another abandoned track on the bridge	
DB Cabin Bridge			1 track of the Montauk Branch	The bridge was originally built to carry three tracks	
Jamaica Bay
Cross Bay Veterans Memorial Bridge	1970	0.7 miles	6 lanes Cross Bay Boulevard		
Joseph P. Addabbo Memorial Bridge	1971	0.7 miles	6 lanes of Cross Bay Boulevard		
North Channel Swing Bridge			train	Not actually a movable bridge. Howard Beach to Broad Channel.	
Beach Channel Drawbridge			trains	Broad Channel to The Rockaways	
102nd Street Bridge				Connecting Hamilton Beach at Russell Street with Howard Beach, also known as "Lenihan's Bridge".	
Hawtree Creek Bridge			163rd Avenue and 99th Street in Howard Beach across to Hamilton Beach at Rau Court and Davenport Court	Also known as "Joel Miele Sr. Bridge".	
Rockaway Inlet (Brooklyn and Queens)
Marine Parkway-Gil Hodges Memorial Bridge	1937	1226 m	4 lanes of Flatbush Avenue		

== Tunnels ==
Each of the tunnels that run underneath the East and Hudson Rivers were marvels of engineering when first constructed. The Holland Tunnel is the oldest of the vehicular tunnels, opening to great fanfare in 1927 as the first mechanically ventilated underwater tunnel. The Queens Midtown Tunnel was opened in 1940 to relieve the congestion on the city's bridges. Each of its tubes were designed 1.5 feet (0.46 m) wider than the Holland Tunnel in order to accommodate the wider cars of the period. When the Brooklyn–Battery Tunnel opened in 1950, it was the longest continuous underwater vehicular tunnel in North America, a title it still holds. The Lincoln Tunnel has three tubes linking midtown Manhattan to New Jersey, a configuration that provides the flexibility to provide four lanes in one direction during rush hours, or three lanes in both direction.

All four underwater road tunnels were built by Ole Singstad: the Holland Tunnel's original chief engineer Clifford Milburn Holland died, as did his successor, Milton H. Freeman, after which Singstad became chief engineer, finishing the Holland Tunnel and then building the remaining tunnels.

=== East River ===
From south to north:

Name	Opening year	Length	Carries	Toll		Maintained by	Comments	Image
Name	Opening year	meters	Carries	Cash	E-Z Pass	Maintained by	Comments	Image
Brooklyn–Battery Tunnel	1950	2,779 m (9,117 ft)	4 lanes of I-478	$12.03	$7.46	MTA Bridges and Tunnels	Officially known as the Hugh L. Carey Tunnel	
Joralemon Street Tunnel	1908	2,709 m (8,888 ft)	trains	None		MTA New York City Transit		
Montague Street Tunnel	1920	2,136 m (7,009 ft)	trains	None		MTA New York City Transit		
Clark Street Tunnel	1919	1,800 m (5,900 ft)	trains	None		MTA New York City Transit		
Cranberry Street Tunnel	1933		trains	None		MTA New York City Transit		
Rutgers Street Tunnel	1936		trains	None		MTA New York City Transit		
14th Street Tunnel	1924		train	None		MTA New York City Transit		
East River Tunnels	1910	1,204 m (3,949 ft)	part of the New York Tunnel Extension; Amtrak and Long Island Rail Road (Northeast Corridor)	None		Amtrak		
Queens–Midtown Tunnel	1940	1,955 m (6,414 ft)	4 lanes of I-495 (Long Island Expressway)	$12.03	$7.46	MTA Bridges and Tunnels		The Queens–Midtown Tunnel
Steinway Tunnel	1915		trains	None		MTA New York City Transit		
53rd Street Tunnel	1933		trains	None		MTA New York City Transit		
60th Street Tunnel	1920		trains	None		MTA New York City Transit		
63rd Street Tunnel	1989	960 m (3,140 ft)	Upper level: trains Lower level: LIRR to Grand Central Madison	None		MTA New York City Transit MTA Long Island Railroad		
Ravenswood Tunnel	1894		Electricity, natural gas, steam, and number 6 fuel oil	None		Consolidated Edison	First tunnel under the East River and Roosevelt Island, between Big Allis power plant in Astoria and Upper East Side	

=== Harlem River ===
From south to north:

Name	Opening year	Length	Carries	Toll	Maintained by	Comments
Lexington Avenue Tunnel	1918	391 m (1,283 ft)	trains	None	MTA New York City Transit	
149th Street Tunnel	1905	195 m (641 ft)	train	None	MTA New York City Transit	
Concourse Tunnel	1933		trains	None	MTA New York City Transit	

=== Hudson River ===
From south to north:

Name	Opening year	Length	Carries	Toll		Maintained by	Comments	Image
Name	Opening year	Length	Carries	Cash	E-Z Pass	Maintained by	Comments	Image
Downtown Hudson Tubes	1909	1,720 m (5,650 ft)	Montgomery-Cortlandt Tunnels; Port Authority Trans-Hudson	None		PANYNJ (PATH)		PATH train emerging from the Hudson tubes, into the Exchange Place station
Holland Tunnel	1927	south tube: 2,551 m (8,371 ft) north tube: 2,608 m (8,558 ft)	4 lanes of I-78 (Canal Street); Route 139 (NJ side)	$23.30	$16.79	PANYNJ	Tolls collected in eastbound direction only.	Traveling through the Holland Tunnel, from Manhattan to Jersey City, New Jersey
Uptown Hudson Tubes	1908	1,700 m (5,500 ft)	Hoboken-Morton Tunnels; Port Authority Trans-Hudson	None		PANYNJ (PATH)		
North River Tunnels	1910	1,900 m (6,100 ft)	part of New York Tunnel Extension; Amtrak and New Jersey Transit (Northeast Corridor)	None		Amtrak		
Lincoln Tunnel	north tube: 1945 center tube: 1937 south tube: 1957	south tube: 2,440 m (8,006 ft) center tube: 2,504 m (8,216 ft) north tube: 2,281 m (7,482 ft)	6 lanes of NY 495 (NY side); Route 495 (NJ side)	$23.30	$16.79	PANYNJ	Tolls collected in eastbound direction only.	

=== Newtown Creek ===
Name	Opening year	Carries	Toll	Maintained by	Comments
Greenpoint Tube	1933	train	None	MTA New York City Transit	

== Bridges and tunnels spanning land only ==
- Battery Park Underpass, Manhattan
- Cobble Hill Tunnel, Brooklyn
- First Avenue Tunnel from 42nd Street to 47th Street, Manhattan
- Park Avenue Tunnel (33rd–40th Streets), Park Avenue Viaduct, and Park Avenue Tunnel (45th–97th Streets), Manhattan
- Riverside Drive Viaduct, Riverside Drive, Manhattan
- Seeley Street Bridge over Prospect Avenue, Brooklyn
- Trinity Place Bridge, Manhattan

== See also ==
- List of bridges documented by the Historic American Engineering Record in New York (state)
- List of tunnels documented by the Historic American Engineering Record in New York (state)
- List of fixed crossings of the East River
- List of crossings of the Harlem River
- List of fixed crossings of the Hudson River
