= Retractile drawbridge =

Type of movable bridge

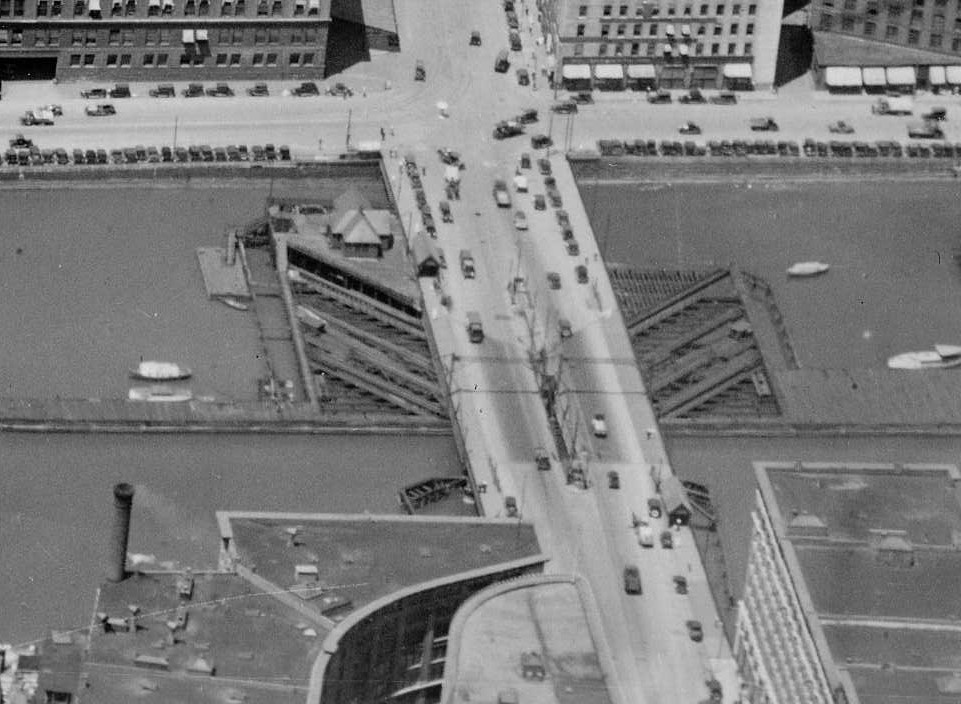
Boston's Summer Street Bridge in July 1925, showing the tracks for the retractable sections to slide on

A retractile drawbridge is a rare type of moveable bridge in which the span is pulled away diagonally on rails. It is a variant of the retractable bridge. Only four examples are known to exist in the United States. It is believed to have been invented by T. Willis Pratt in the 1860s.

== See also ==
- Carroll Street Bridge, the country's oldest surviving retractile bridge, located in Gowanus, Brooklyn
- Summer Street Bridge, an example of this type of bridge, located in Boston, Massachusetts, U.S.
