= Bridge tender's house =

Structure on a movable bridge

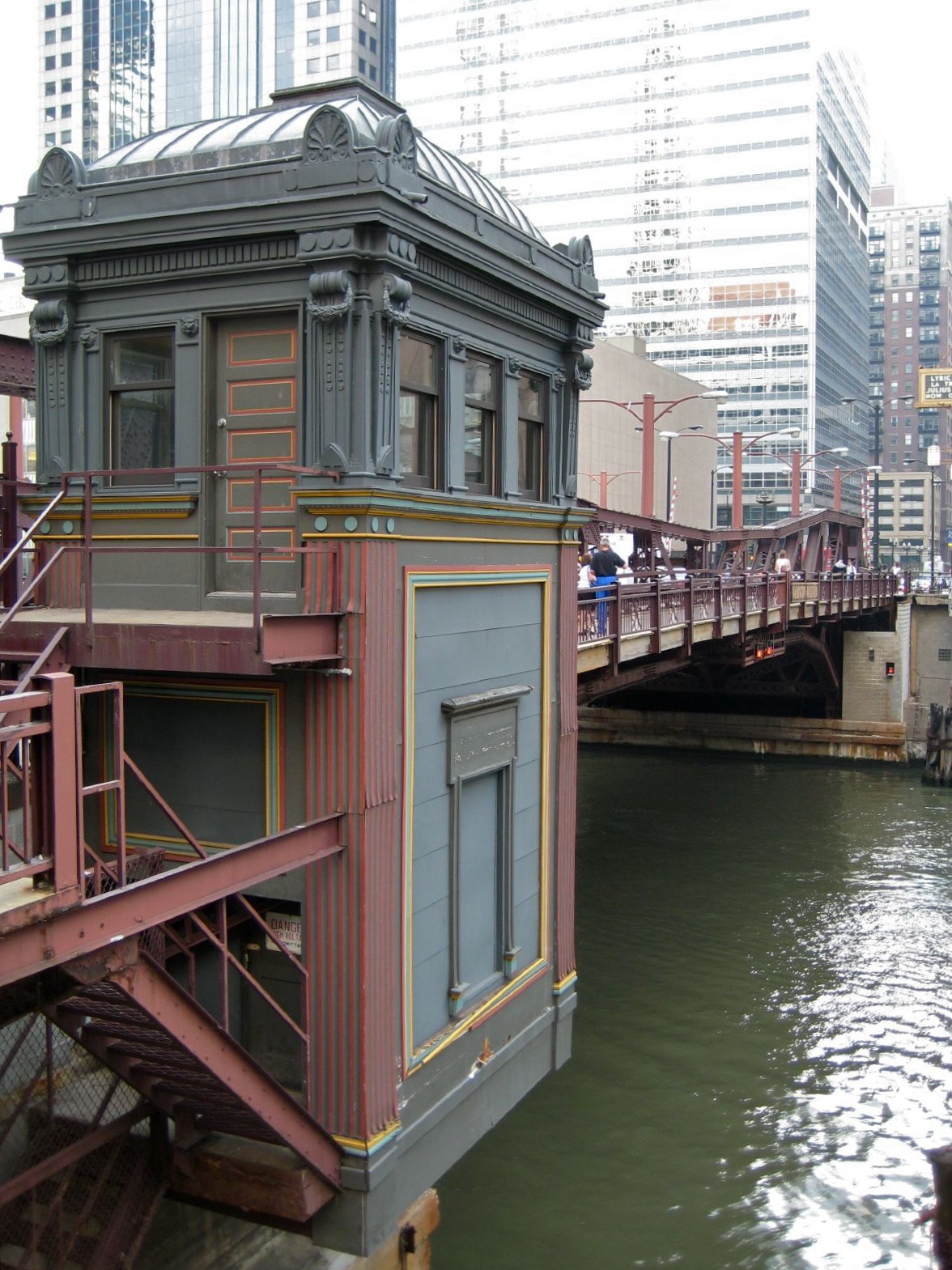
Bridge tender's house on south side of Chicago's Washington Blvd Bridge

A bridge tender's house is a structure near or upon a moveable bridge from which a bridge tender may operate the bridge and monitor river traffic, and in which they may reside. It may contain the controls and the mechanicals to operate the bridge.

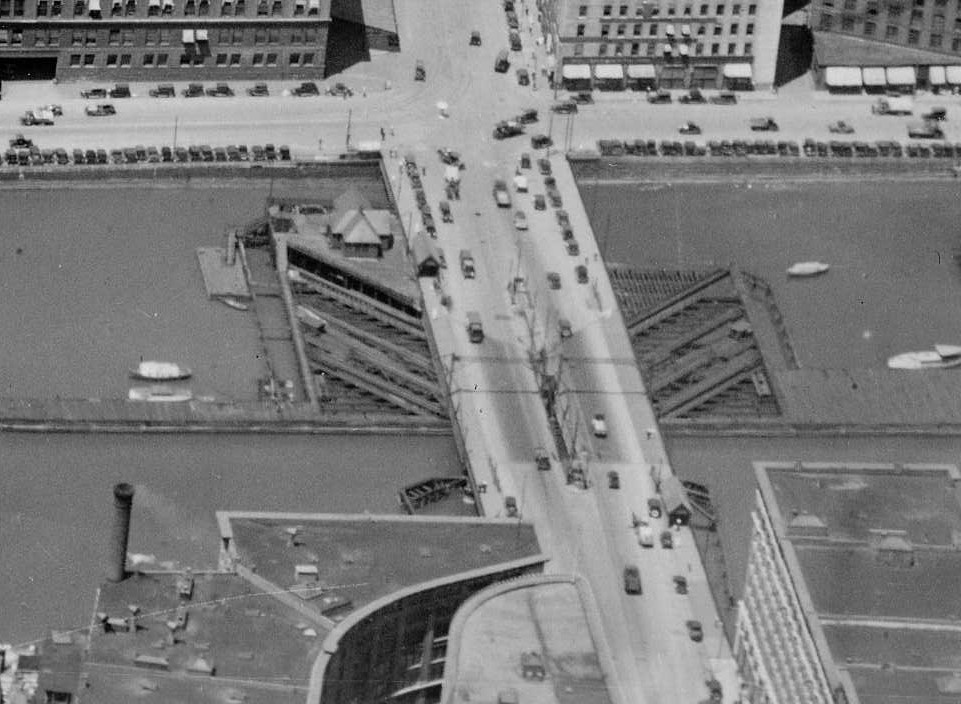
Aerial view of Boston's Summer Street Bridge in 1925; the bridge tender's house is seen to the left of the bridge, constructed on a platform above the water
