= Edward Abraham Byrne =

American civil engineer (1864–1938)

- Born: January 27, 1864; New York City, U.S.
- Died: December 6, 1938 (aged 74); Rye, New York, U.S.
- Resting place: Calvary Cemetery
- Education: College of the City of New York
- Spouse: Elizabeth Mary Dillon (m. 1902; died 1912)
- Children: 2

Edward Abraham Byrne (January 27, 1864 – December 6, 1938) was an American civil engineer responsible for the construction of a number of bridges in the boroughs of New York. He was of Irish descent.

== Biography ==
Byrne was born in New York, New York state, on January 27, 1864, the son of Frederick John and Susan Mary (Power) Byrne, and the descendant of an old New York family of Irish heritage. Educated in the Public Schools of the city, he graduated from the College of the City of New York in 1884.

=== Engineering career ===
Edward Byrne began his civil engineering career in 1886 with the New York City Aqueduct Commission on the construction of the Croton Water Supply System. It is of interest that, on this project, he met Robert Ridgway, who also was destined to become a distinguished engineer and an outstanding civil servant.

From 1889 to the close of 1897, Byrne worked on highways and bridges for the old Department of Public Works of New York City.

On January 1, 1898, he joined the Department of Bridges and began a striking and noteworthy service which ended in November 1933, with his resignation from the position of Chief Engineer of the Department of Plant and Structures (the successor of the Bridge Department), in order to assume the duties of Chief Engineer of the Triborough Bridge. His thirty-six years of service in the Department of Bridges, and its successor, the Department of Plant and Structures, may be divided into two periods.

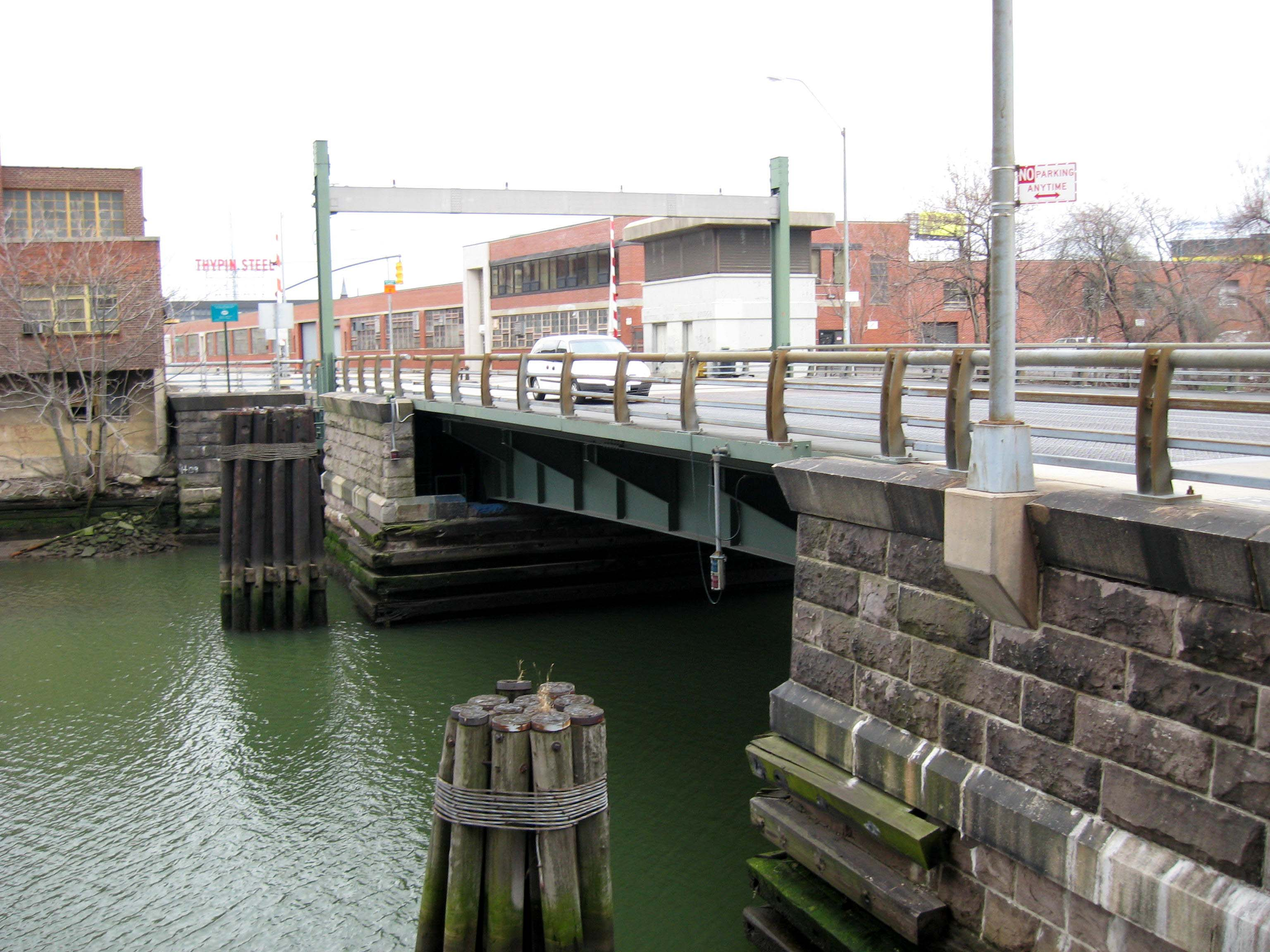
Hunterspoint Avenue Bridge

==== 1898–1911 ====
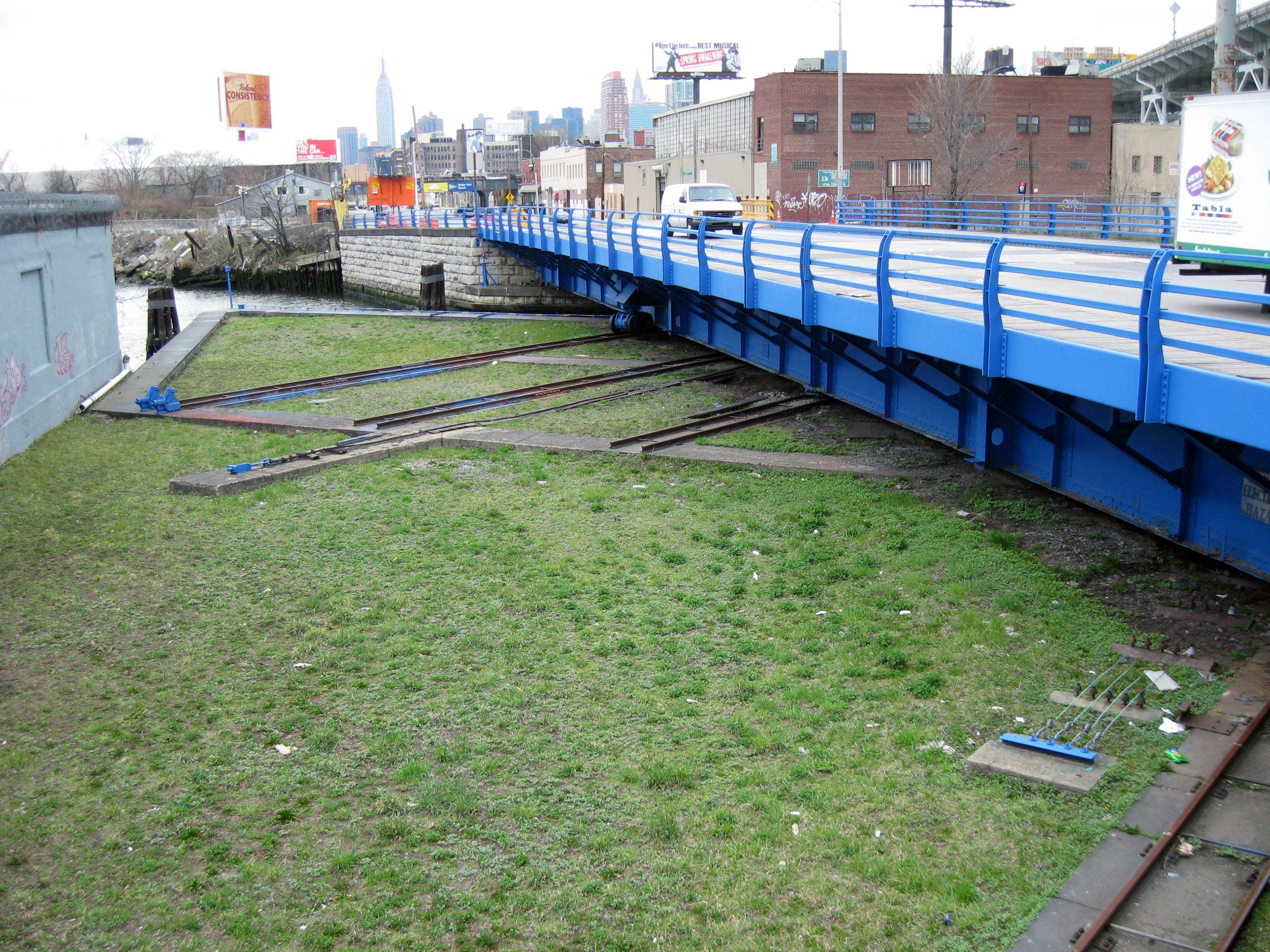
Borden Avenue Bridge

During this period, he was in charge of bridge construction and maintenance, supervising the construction of the Willis Avenue Bridge over the Harlem River, the Vernon Avenue Bridge, the Borden Avenue and Hunters Point bridges over Dutch Kills, and the old bridge over Flushing River.

==== 1912 onwards ====
The second period began with his assumption of the office of Deputy Chief Engineer in 1912, followed by his appointment as chief engineer in 1915. At the close of World War I, the Department of Plant and Structures began a period of intense activity, which was cut short only by the Great Depression of 1930. Not less than fifteen new bridges of major importance, of which ten were of the bascule type, were built in this period. In addition, under Byrne's direction, the Department designed and constructed a number of large incinerator plants and many other structures for the several departments of the City. He increased the capacity of the Manhattan and Queensboro Bridges over the East River by the construction of additional vehicular roadways on their upper decks.

===== Triborough Bridge =====
Byrne was greatly preoccupied with the study of traffic facilities. As far back as 1916, he conceived the idea of the Triborough Bridge to link the Boroughs of Manhattan, Bronx, and Queens. He fostered this idea until he thought the time was ripe for its materialization. The actual work on the foundations and anchorages was begun in 1929 under his direction, while he was the Chief Engineer of the Department of Plant and Structures.

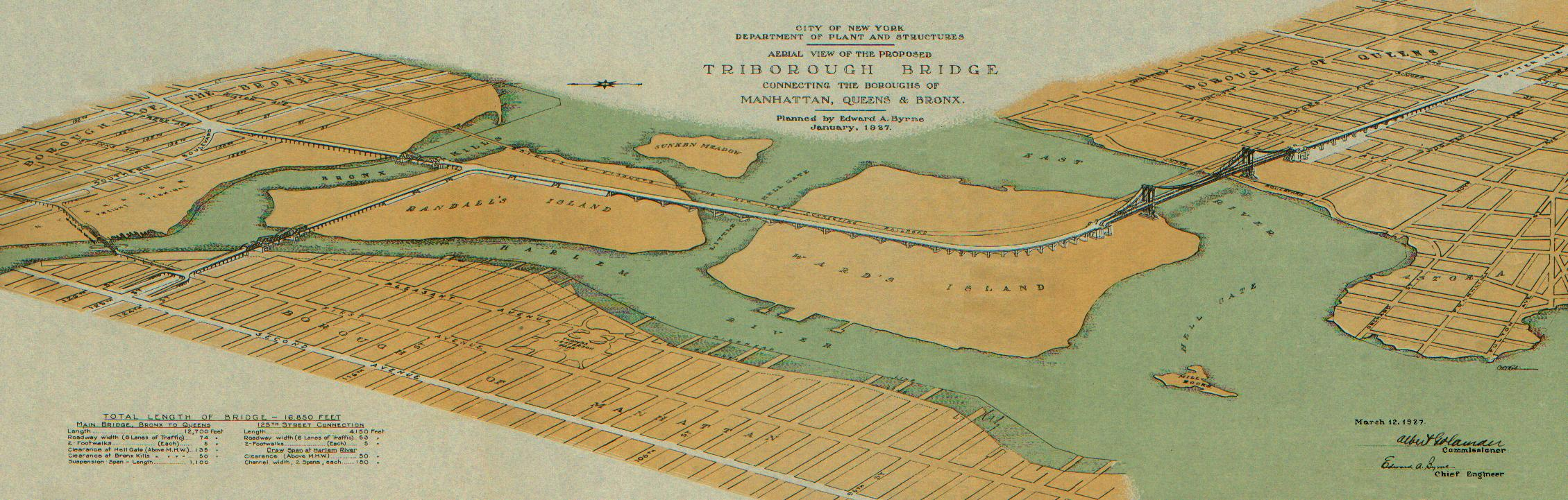
Aerial View of the Proposed Triborough Bridge - Planned by Edward A. Byrne - January, 1927

Then, in November 1933, upon the organization of the Triborough Bridge Authority, he became its first chief engineer. There is no doubt that Byrne looked upon the construction of the Triborough Bridge as the culmination of his career, but he was forced to relinquish his post in February 1934, only several months after he had entered it with such high anticipation.

Primarily, Byrne was an engineer and executive, and because of his character, integrity, and devotion, held his position, independent of politics, throughout successive administrations. The administration headed by Fiorello H. La Guardia assumed the Mayor's office on January 1, 1934, with a mandate for a "clean sweep", and the complete reorganization of the Triborough Bridge Authority was among the changes which followed. "It is fitting that credit for the initiation of the Triborough Bridge should be accorded Edward Byrne".

- Newspaper Article from The New York Sun (dated July 11th, 1936)
- Letter to the Editor of The New York Sun (dated July 16th, 1936)
- Letter to the Editor of The New York Sun (dated July 20th, 1936)

===== Other New York City Projects =====
Another instance of Byrne's active concern with traffic facilities is his advocacy of a vehicular tunnel from the Battery to Hamilton Avenue, in Brooklyn, by way of Governors Island. He prepared preliminary plans for this project which was an exceedingly live story in 1939. In 1929, also, he prepared preliminary plans and estimates for a vehicular tunnel under the East River from Manhattan Island at Thirty-eight Street to the Borough of Queens.

=== Personal life ===
Edward Byrne was married to Elizabeth Mary Dillon in 1902. She died on December 6, 1912, aged 74, in Rye, New York. Byrne did not remarry. He participated in the lives of his children until they were safely through college.

Byrne was a devout Roman Catholic who demonstrated strong leadership and determination when facing difficult challenges in his work. He maintained strict ethical standards throughout his department. While his long-standing leadership role gave him a serious demeanor, he frequently provided assistance and support to those in need. His engineering staff noted that during field site visits, he regularly hosted group lunches and maintained a relaxed, welcoming environment despite the demands of the business.

He was fond of the theater, particularly musical comedy, and delighted in attending football games and other sports. When his sons were at the University of Notre Dame, Indiana, he attended religiously all the Notre Dame games, enthusiastically supporting them as any undergraduate.

Edward Byrne died in Rye, New York, on December 6, 1938, at the home of his son Edward. He was buried in Calvary Cemetery, in Queens, Long Island, and thus his last ride was over the bridge which played so great a part in the drama of his last years. At the time, he was survived by two sons, Edward and George Dillon; and by two granddaughters, Elizabeth and Barbara Byrne, the children of Edward.

== Professional associations ==
Byrne was a Consulting Engineer of the New York State Bridge and Tunnel Commission, and of the Camden-Philadelphia Bridge. He was a Past-President of the Society of Municipal Engineers of New York; a Past-President of the Kings County Chapter of the New York State Society of Professional Engineers a member of the Brooklyn Engineers Club, and of the Catholic Club. He was a trustee of the Greenpoint Savings Bank.

Byrne was elected a Member of the ASCE on April 16, 1918.
