= Summer Street Bridge =

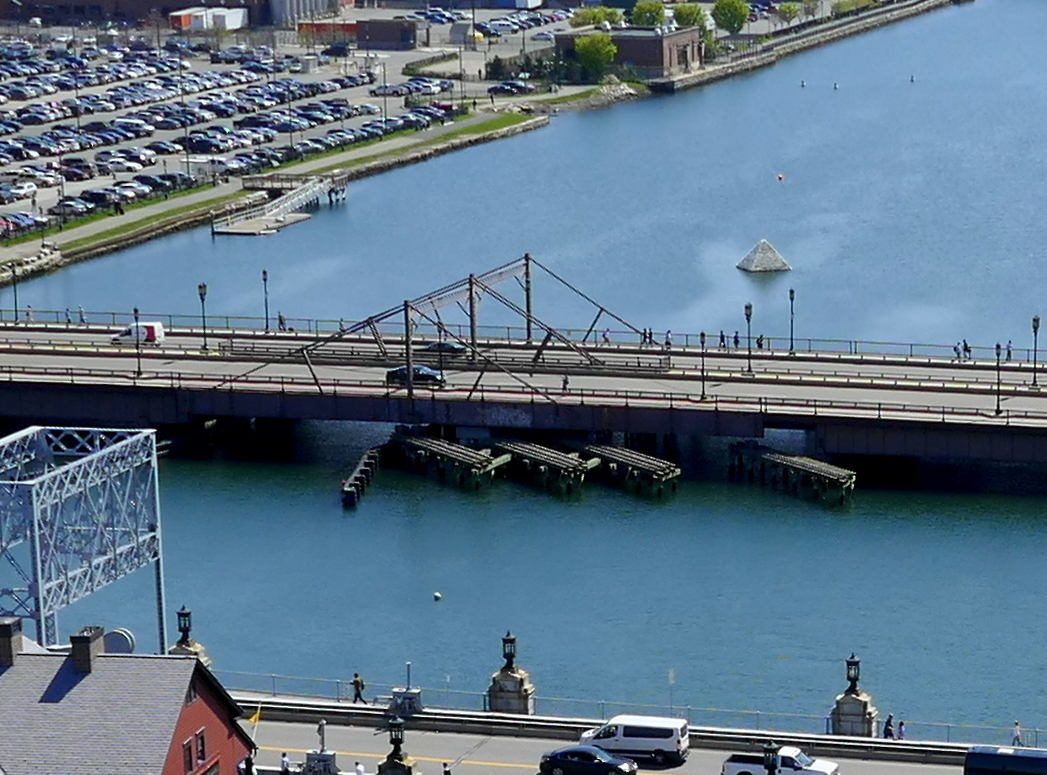
- Aerial view of Summer Street Bridge
- Coordinates: 42.35109°N 71.05194°W
- Carries: Summer Street
- Crosses: Fort Point Channel
- Locale: Boston, Massachusetts, U.S.
- Official name: Summer Street Retractile Bridge
- Owner: City of Boston
- Maintained by: Boston Public Works

Characteristics
- Design: Retractable bridge
- Material: Steel, masonry
- Total length: 507 feet (155 m)
- Width: 44 feet (13 m) (each deck)
- Height: 25 feet (7.6 m) (above deck)
- Longest span: 132 feet (40 m) (draws)
- No. of spans: 5
- No. of lanes: 4

Rail characteristics
- No. of tracks: 2 (discontinued in 1950s, no longer extant)

History
- Constructed by: Berlin Iron Bridge Co. (draws), A. & P. Roberts Company (fixed spans)
- Built: 1898–1899

Location
- Interactive map of Summer Street Bridge

The Summer Street Bridge is a retractile bridge built in 1899 in Boston, Massachusetts, over the Fort Point Channel. It still stands, but has served as a fixed bridge since 1959. This was the site of the Summer Street Bridge disaster in 1916.

== History ==
The structure was built to replace a swing bridge dating to 1855. Construction contracts were awarded in October 1897, and the first draw was operational in August 1899. The bridge consists of two parallel decks, each 44 feet (13 m) wide, which when operational, had 132-foot-long (40 m) center sections that were retracted independently and diagonally to allow water traffic to pass. (Note: This bridge is oriented northwest–southeast, with the northwest-bound lanes of traffic retracting diagonally to the north, and the southeast-bound lanes retracting diagonally to the west.) The retractable sections had wooden planking; the bridge opened to traffic on January 26, 1900. The decking traveled on "trucks" (joined sets of wheels) on rails, pulled by electricity-powered winches (removed in 1994).

The bridge was the site of the Summer Street Bridge disaster on the night of November 7, 1916, in which 46 passengers were killed when a streetcar fell into Fort Point Channel. The bridge remained in use, although its streetcar traffic was discontinued in the 1950s and the spans were fixed in place in 1959. Originally, the structure had a bridge tender's house, which was removed in 1965.

In 1970, a major fire destroyed the wooden Summer Street Viaduct that led to the bridge from the South Boston side, crossing Penn Central Railroad tracks. It was rebuilt as an earthen berm, except for one surviving metal truss that was removed in the 1990s.

When documented by the Historic American Engineering Record in 1984, the Summer Street Bridge was one of only four retractile drawbridges left in the United States, two of which were on Summer Street in Boston. The other bridge on Summer Street, crossing Reserved Channel, was replaced in 2003.

== Gallery ==
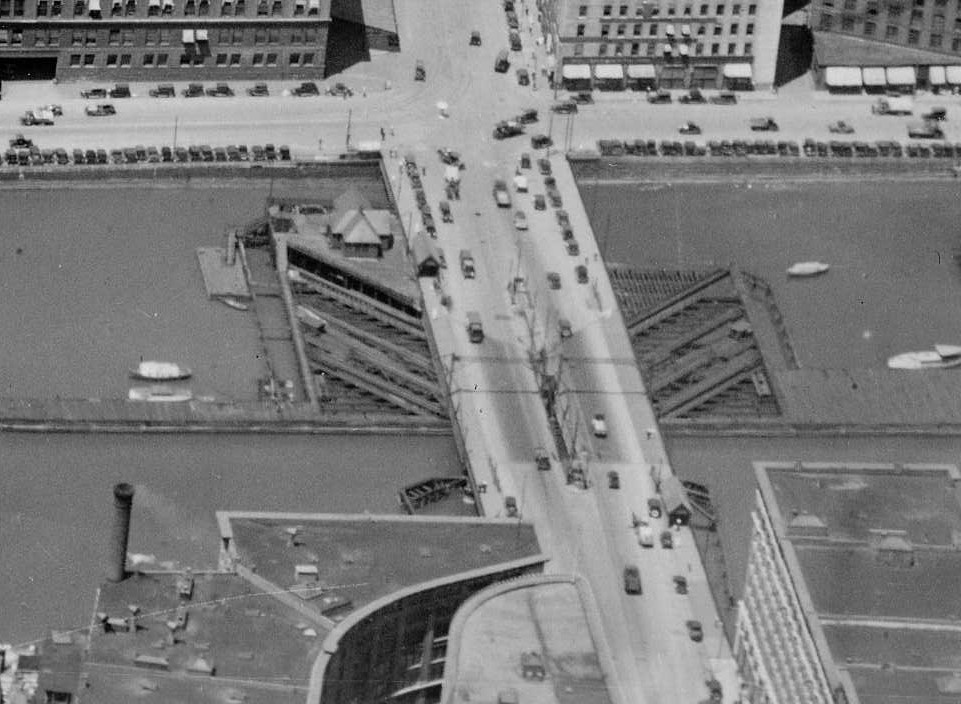
Aerial view of the bridge in July 1925

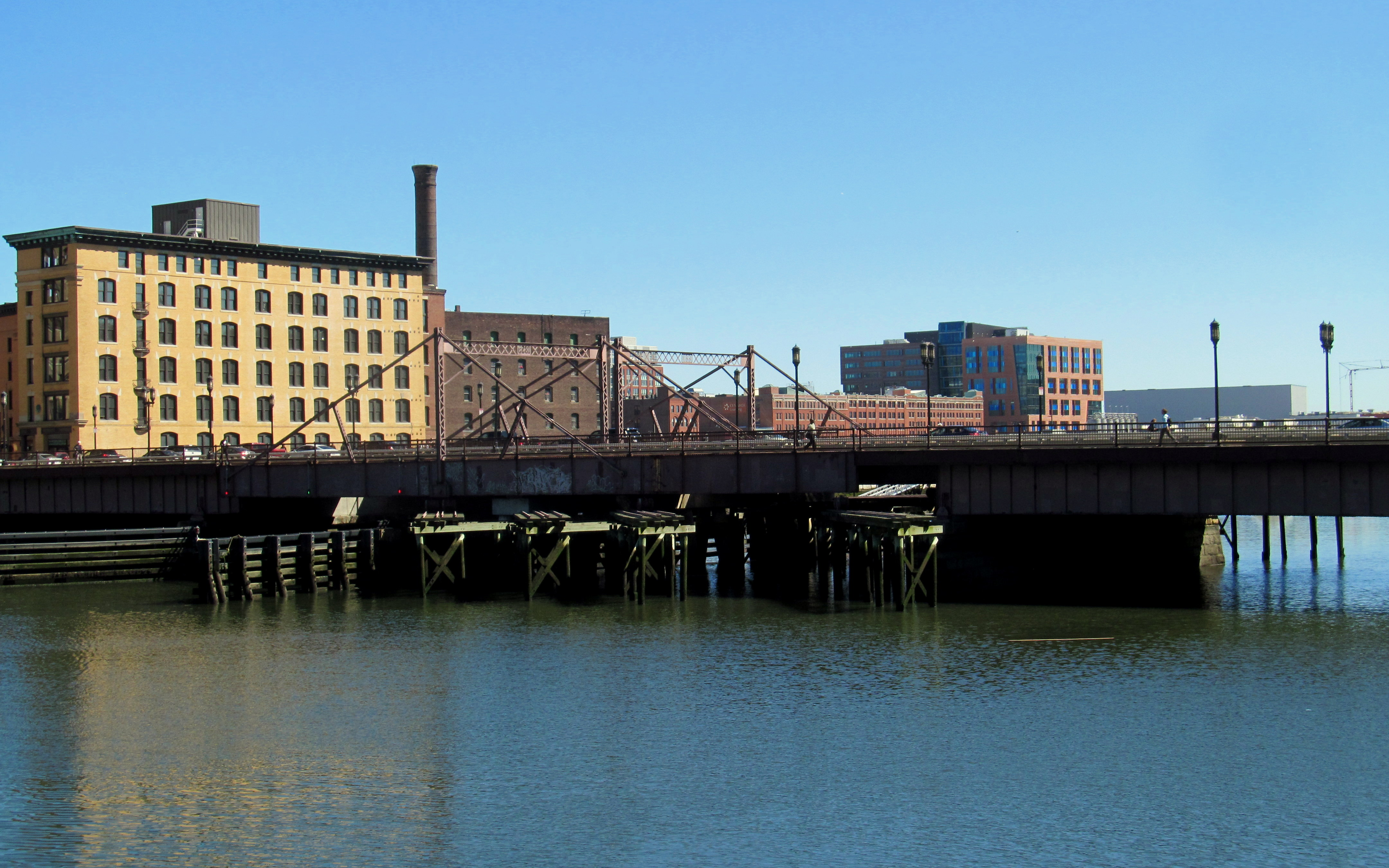
Side view in June 2017

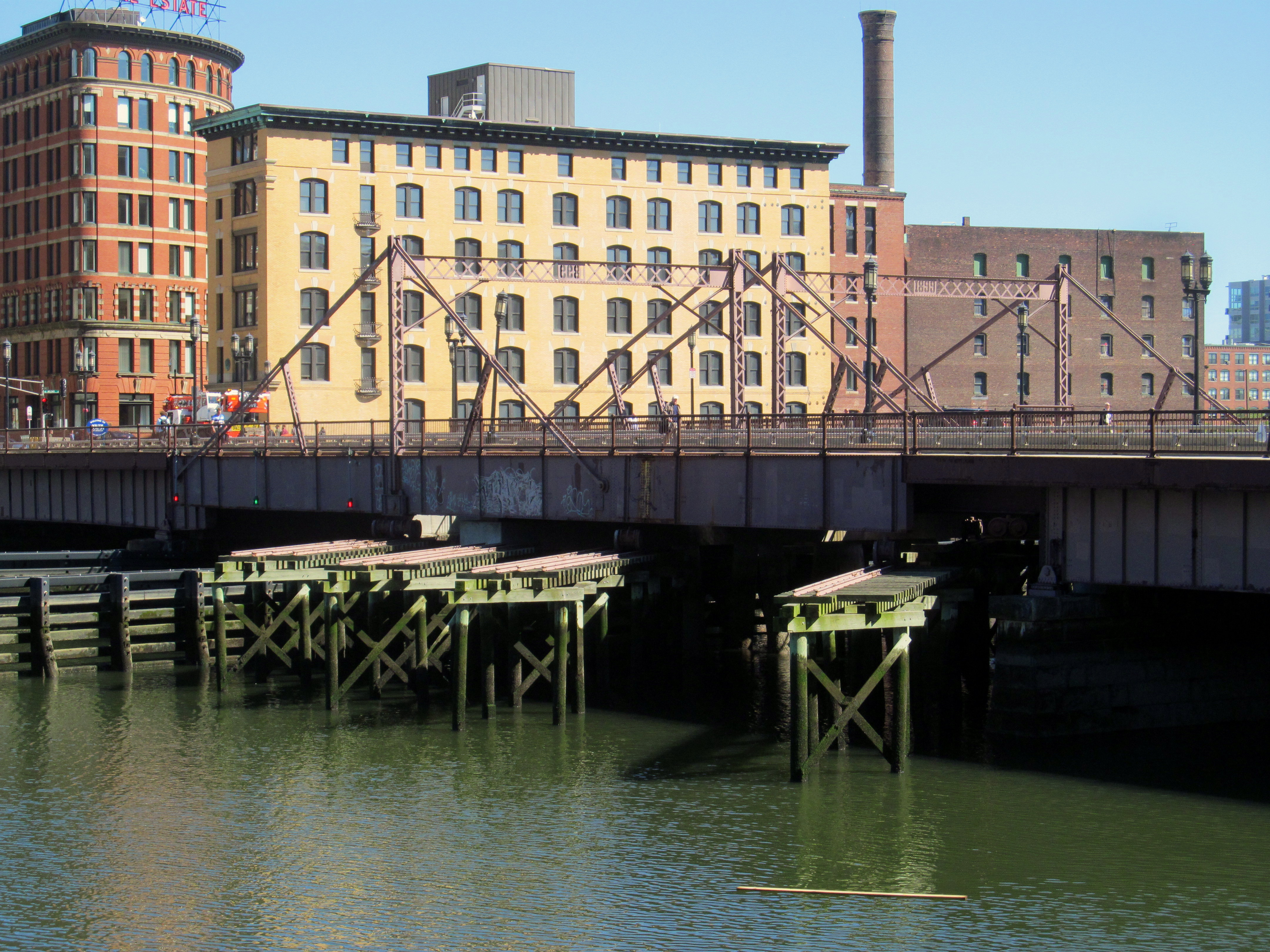
Center draw in June 2017

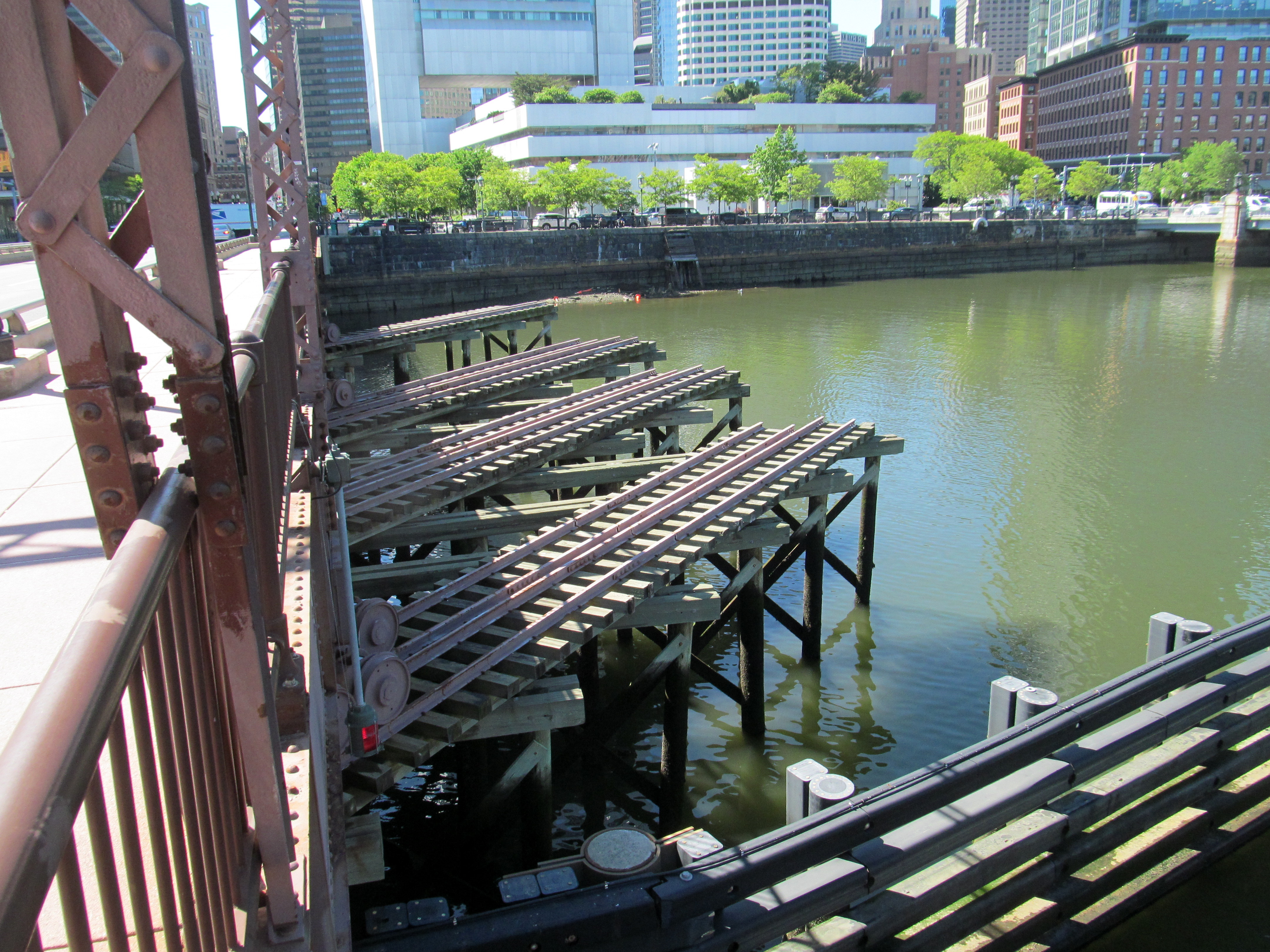
Rail detail below draw section in June 2017

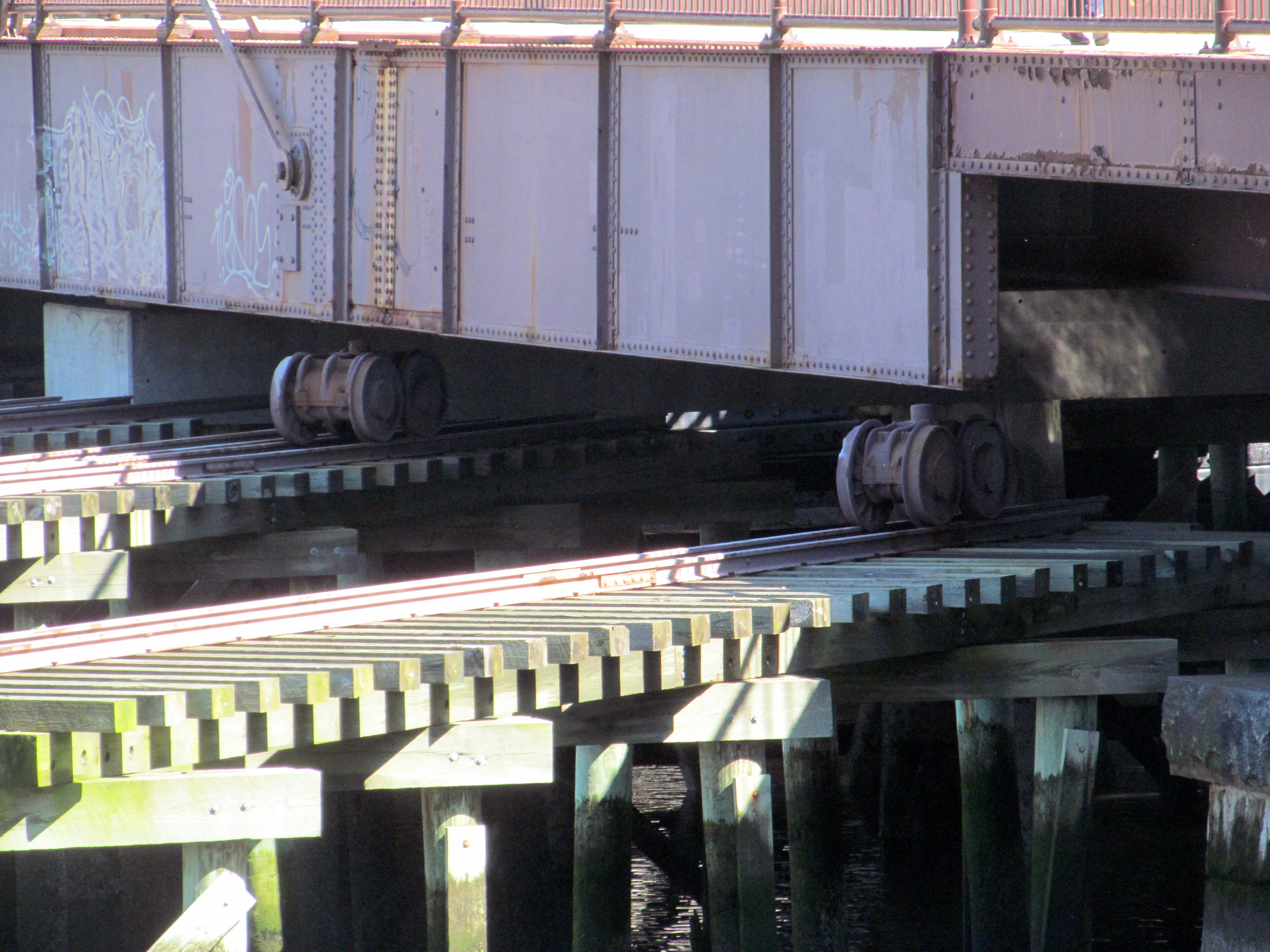
Wheel detail below draw section in June 2017

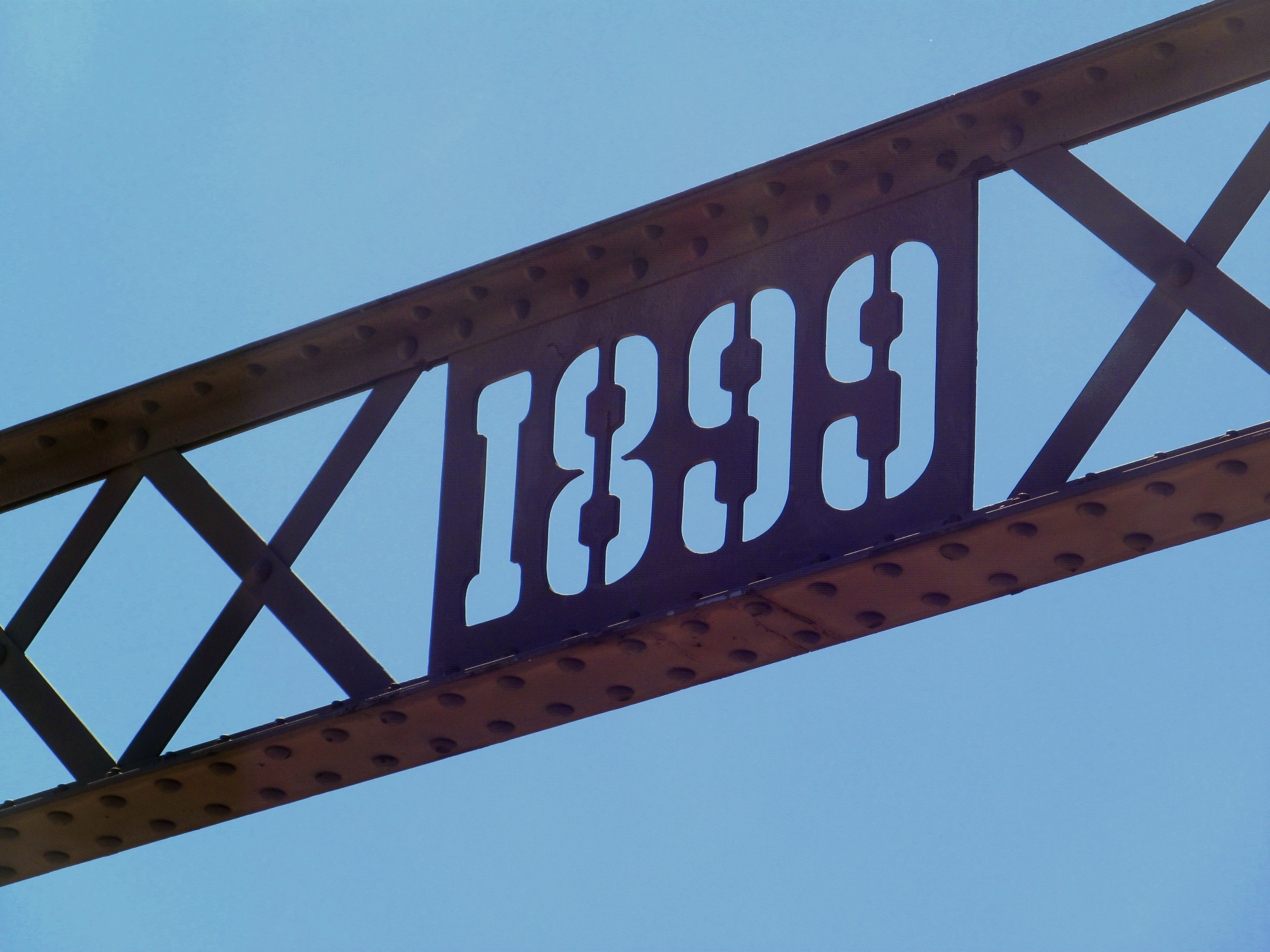
Date detail above draw section in June 2017

== See also ==
- List of bridges documented by the Historic American Engineering Record in Massachusetts
