= Carroll Street Bridge =

Bridge in Brooklyn, New York

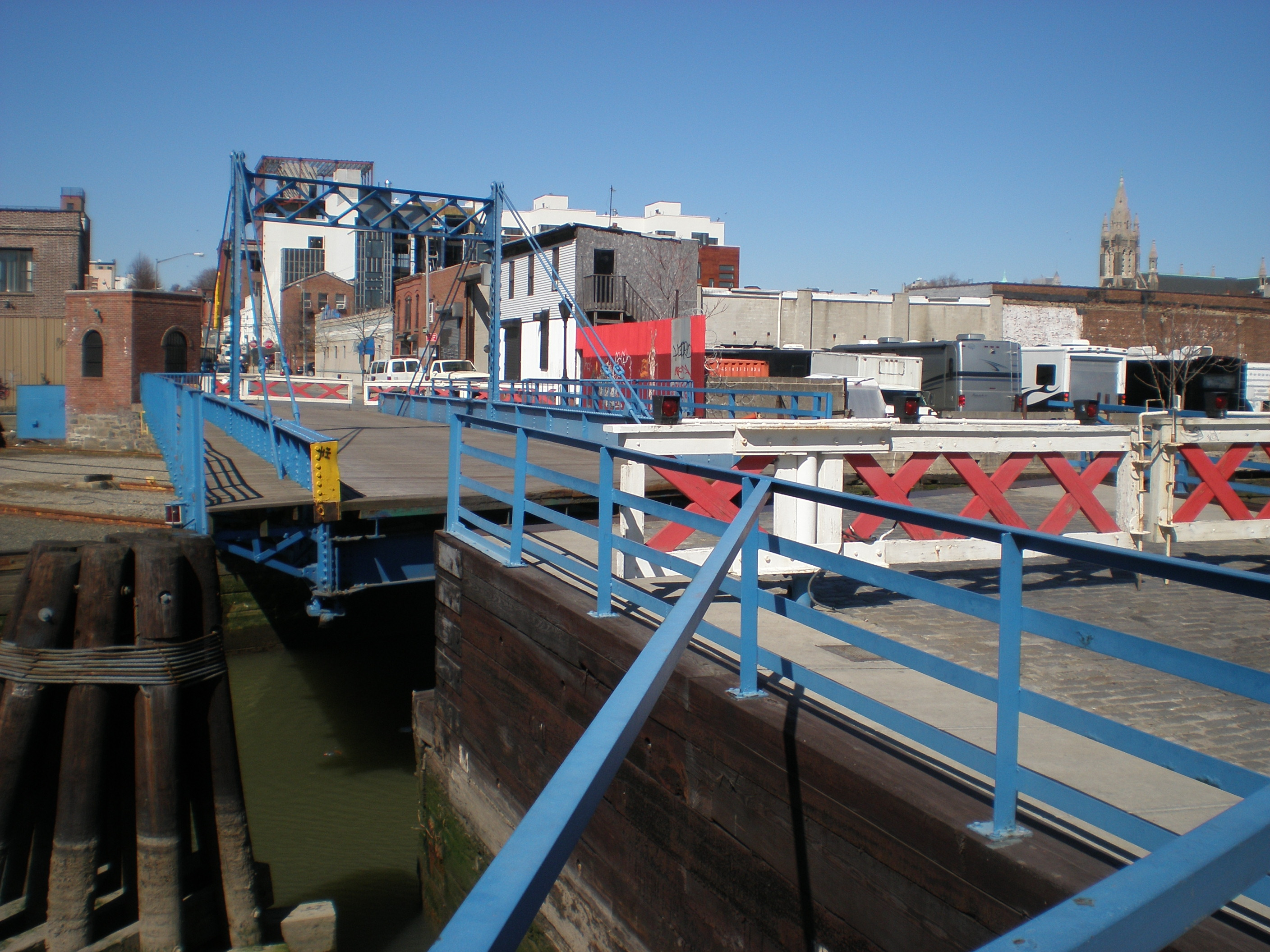
- Carroll Street Bridge retracting
- Coordinates: 40.6782°N 73.9892°W
- Carries: 1 lane of Carroll Street for pedestrians, bicycles, and emergency venicles, and 2 walkways
- Crosses: Gowanus Canal
- Locale: New York City (Brooklyn)
- Maintained by: New York City Department of Transportation

Characteristics
- Design: Retractable bridge
- Total length: 107 ft 6 in (32.8 m)
- Width: 17.5 ft (5.3 m)
- Longest span: 63 ft (19 m)

History
- Engineering design by: Brooklyn Department of City Works (Robert Van Buren, Chief Engineer; George Ingram, Engineer-in-Charge)
- Opened: 1889; 137 years ago

Statistics
- Daily traffic: 1,142 (2016)
- Toll: Free

Location
- Interactive map of Carroll Street Bridge

The Carroll Street Bridge is a retractable bridge in New York City, crossing the Gowanus Canal in Brooklyn. It carries a single wooden-decked lane and two sidewalks. Completed in 1889, it is operated by the New York City Department of Transportation. It was a vehicular and pedestrian bridge until closed for rehabilitation in 2021; after reopening in 2026, it has carried only pedestrians, bicycles, and emergency vehicles. It is the oldest of the four remaining retractable bridges in the United States and is an official city landmark.

== Description ==
The Carroll Street Bridge is composed of a 107-foot-long (33 m) span supported by a pair of riveted steel plate girders. The span is 17.5 feet (5.3 meters) wide and contains one lane, formerly used for eastbound vehicular traffic, and one walkway to either side. It carries the street of the same name within the neighborhood of Gowanus, Brooklyn. The posted restrictions are a height limit of 12 feet 6 inches (3.81 m) and a weight limit of 10 short tons (8.9 long tons; 9.1 t). The roadway on either side is made of Belgian blocks. In 2010, an average of one thousand vehicles crossed the bridge each weekday.

The movable portion of the span is painted bright blue and shaped like a trapezoid. Carriage truck frames, supported by wheels, are located underneath the girders. When the bridge is retracting, these frames run along three timber-supported steel rails that run diagonally on the western bank of the canal to the south of the span, which opens up a 36-foot-wide (11 m) channel for ships to pass. The frames are moved by a series of pulleys. Originally, the span was retracted using a steam engine, but today it is powered by an electric motor. Swinging gates on either side close off the span whenever the Carroll Street Bridge is in the open position. There is a vintage sign on the bridge, warning drivers that they risked a $5 fine if they drove "faster than a walk".

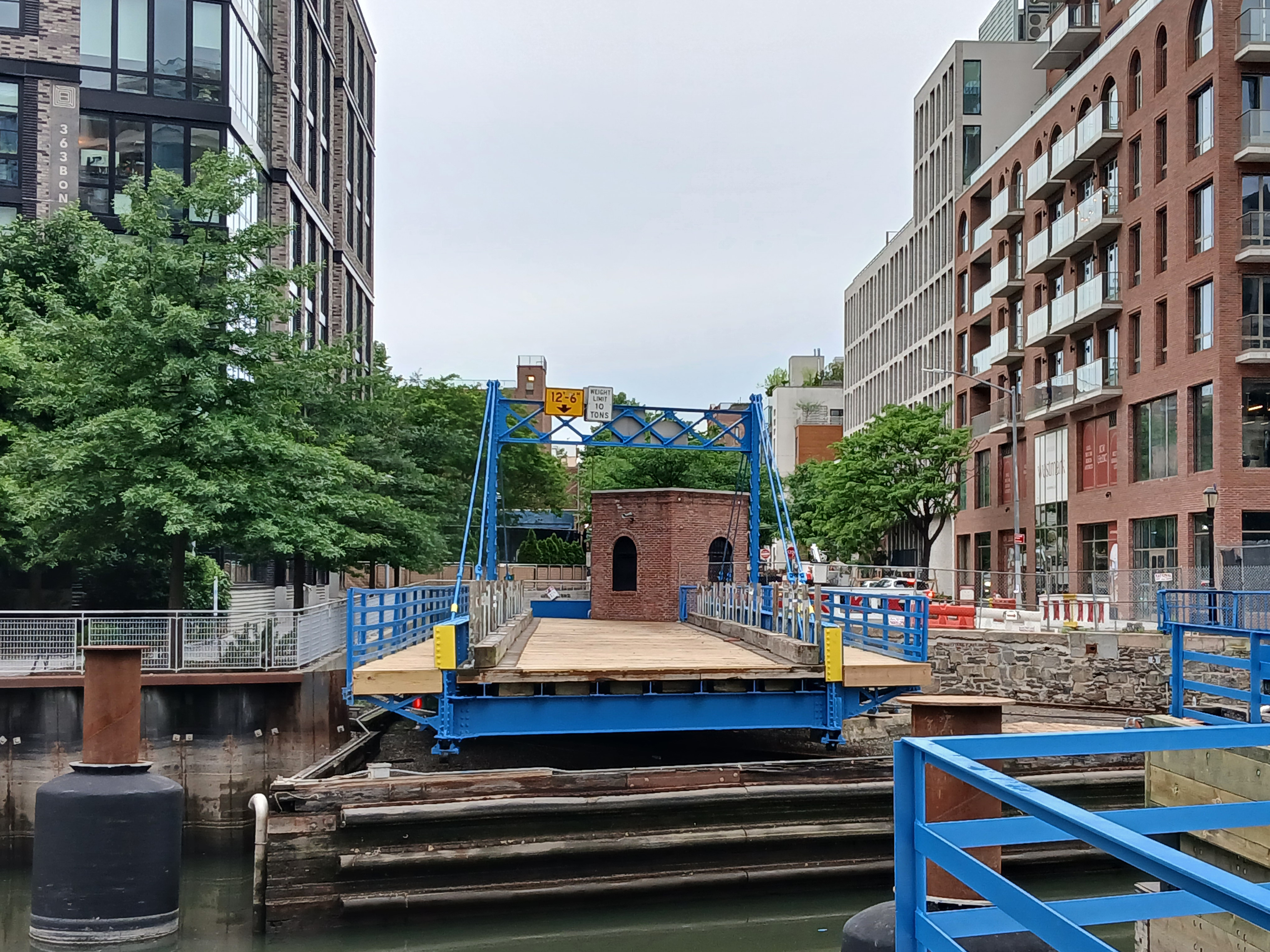
The bridge in retracted position, looking west toward the operator's house

An operator's house is located on the bridge's western end along the southern sidewalk. The booth is normally unmanned, but a bridge attendant can travel to the operator's house within two hours in case the bridge needs to be opened.

The Carroll Street Bridge is one of four remaining retractable bridges in the United States, (Note: According to a 2021 Untapped Cities article, it was one of three remaining.) including the Hood Canal Bridge, and one of two remaining in New York City, the other being the Borden Avenue Bridge in Queens. The city formerly had as many as five retractable bridges, but three of these bridges, in Brooklyn, Staten Island, and the Bronx, were removed in the mid-20th century.

== History ==
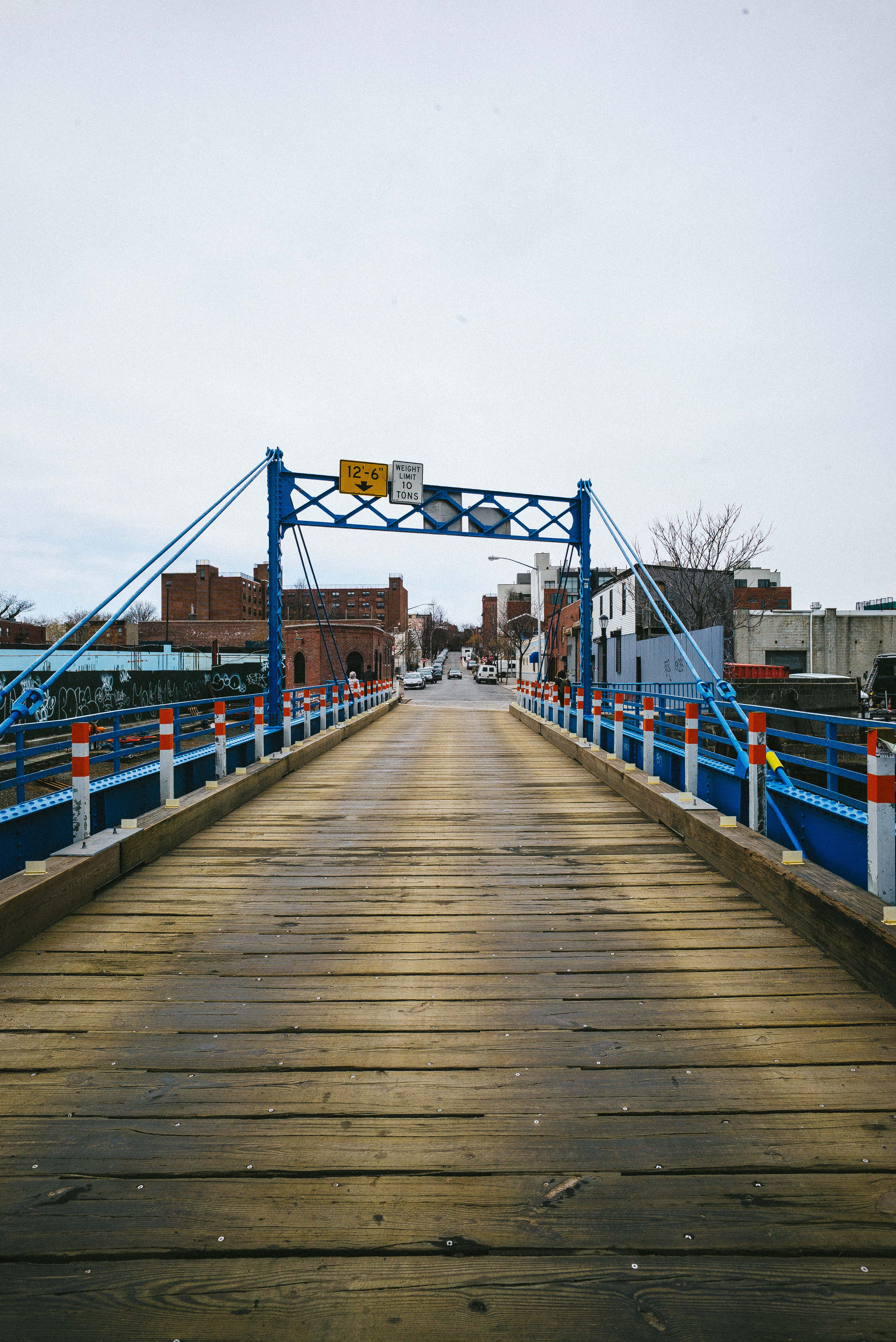
View of the span

In the 1860s, a developer named Edwin Litchfield straightened and expanded the Gowanus Creek into a canal. This resulted in the surrounding swamp being dried up, making it desirable for development. The Gowanus Canal soon became a hub for industrial activity, with businesses specializing in lumber, coal, brick, stone, flour, and plaster. The canal was crossed by six bridges, including one at Carroll Street. When the first Carroll Street bridge closed in 1887, there was a discussion regarding the design of its replacement. Landowners wanted to build a retractable span that would allow the bridge to slide diagonally onto the shore, but the city of Brooklyn resisted, since this would entail acquiring additional land. Ultimately, the city of Brooklyn chose the landowners' plan. This design was chosen since the canal was narrower at Carroll Street, and a more conventional bascule bridge design might prevent some boats from passing.

The new Carroll Street Bridge was designed by chief engineer Robert Van Buren and engineer-in-charge George Ingram. Charles O. H. Fritzche designed the motors while Cooper, Hewitt & Company constructed the steel superstructure. The bridge opened in 1889 at a cost of $29,600. After the Carroll Street Bridge was completed, very few modifications were made to it. The steam motors were supplanted by electric motors in 1908, while the rails and wheels were replaced in 1915 and the handrails were replaced in 1948.

In 1971 the New York City government decided to permanently close the Carroll Street Bridge. At the time, there was a steady decline in the use of the Gowanus Canal, and the city did not have sufficient funds to operate the bridge. The span was only being used by 2,600 cars a day, but had to open twice a day on average. Initially scheduled to be closed on May 28, 1971, the span's closure was later delayed to June 25, and the control station was boarded up. Following protests from residents, the city decided to reopen the Carroll Street Bridge the following month. In 1974, the bridge was closed again for emergency repairs after a mechanical failure left the span in the open position.

Another incident in 1985 or 1986 caused the Carroll Street Bridge to be stuck in the open position for several years, causing it to be closed for several years. During this time, the bridge was used as a filming location for the 1985 movie Heaven Help Us. The bridge was designated an official New York City landmark in 1987; in doing so, the New York City Landmarks Preservation Commission (LPC) called it "rare and unusual". The restored bridge was reopened on September 24, 1989. It was subsequently repaired again in 2011. After being damaged during Hurricane Sandy in 2012, the Carroll Street Bridge was repaired the following year.

The bridge was closed to traffic at the end of 2020. To stabilize the bridge during the Gowanus Canal cleanup project, engineers drilled pipe piles during the early 2020s. The bridge was closed indefinitely in 2021 due to damage during the canal's cleanup. The damage was limited to the foundations, rather than the superstructure and deck, but due to the bridge's landmark status, its original appearance had to be retained. Local residents proposed that vehicular traffic be restricted from the bridge; at the time, many of the area's industries had been replaced with condominiums. Upon reopening on June 15, 2026, traffic was legally restricted to pedestrians, bicycles, and emergency vehicles.

== See also ==
- List of bridges and tunnels in New York City
- List of New York City Designated Landmarks in Brooklyn
