= Borden Avenue Bridge =

Bridge in Queens, New York

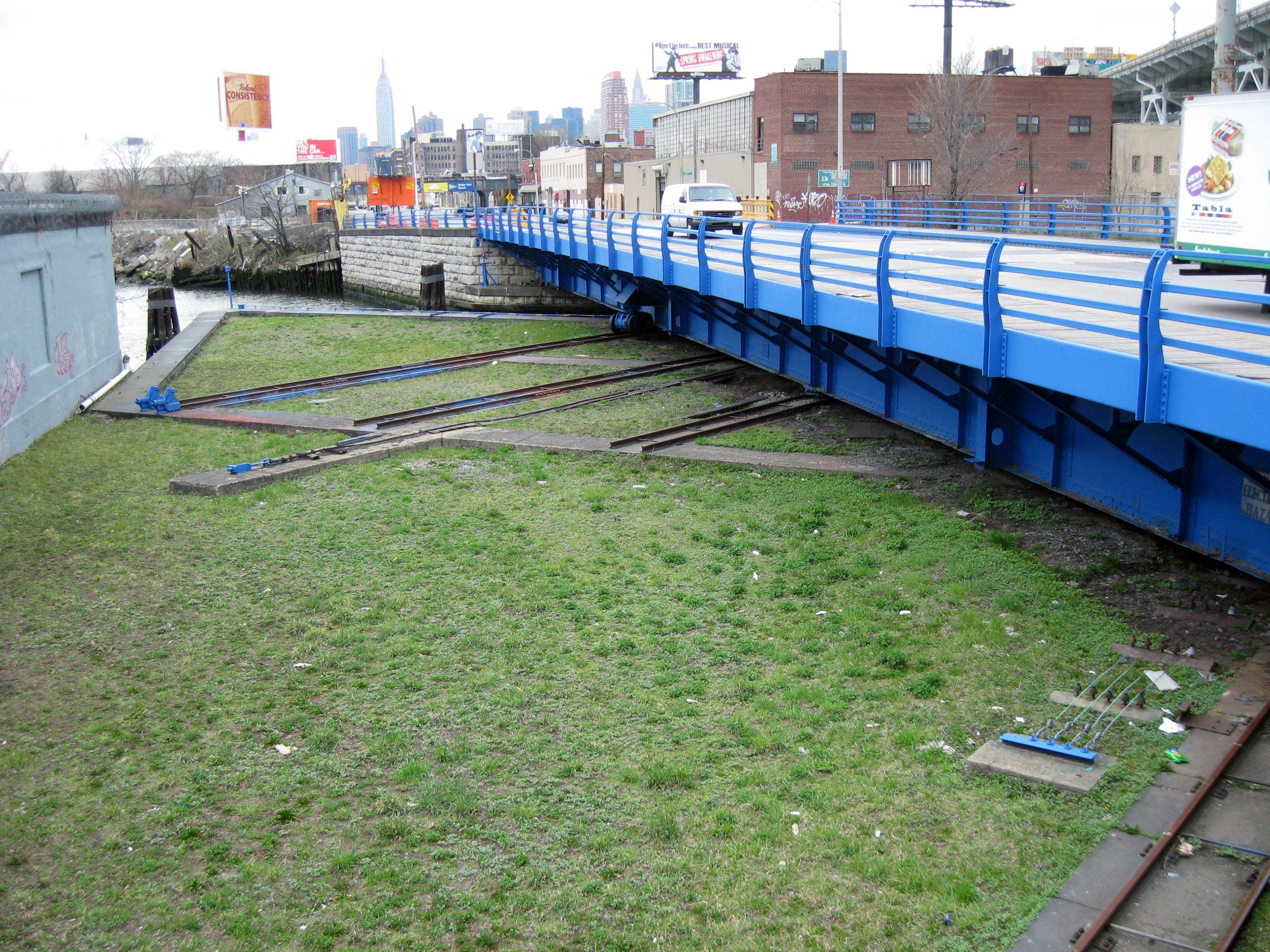
- Coordinates: 40.7391°N 73.9427°W
- Carries: 2 lanes for vehicle traffic and 2 walkways
- Crosses: Dutch Kills, a tributary of Newtown Creek
- Locale: New York City (Queens)
- Maintained by: New York City Department of Transportation

Characteristics
- Design: Retractable bridge
- Total length: 168 ft 6 in (51.4 m)
- Width: 33.8 ft (10.3 m)
- Longest span: 84 ft (26 m)
- Clearance below: 1.5 m (4.9 ft) high tide, 2.7 m (8.9 ft) low tide

History
- Engineering design by: Edward Abraham Byrne
- Opened: March 25, 1908; 118 years ago

Statistics
- Daily traffic: 14,863 (2016)
- Toll: Free

Location
- Interactive map of Borden Avenue Bridge

The Borden Avenue Bridge is a retractable bridge in New York City, in the Long Island City neighborhood of Queens. It carries vehicular and pedestrian traffic across Dutch Kills, a tidal waterway that is a tributary of Newtown Creek. The main span is 84 feet (26 meters) long, and it retracts by sliding on rails. It was last retracted to allow marine traffic to pass in 2005. It was designed by Edward Abraham Byrne and opened on March 25, 1908.

The Borden Avenue bridge is one of four remaining retractable bridges in the United States, and one of two remaining in New York City, the other being the Carroll Street Bridge.

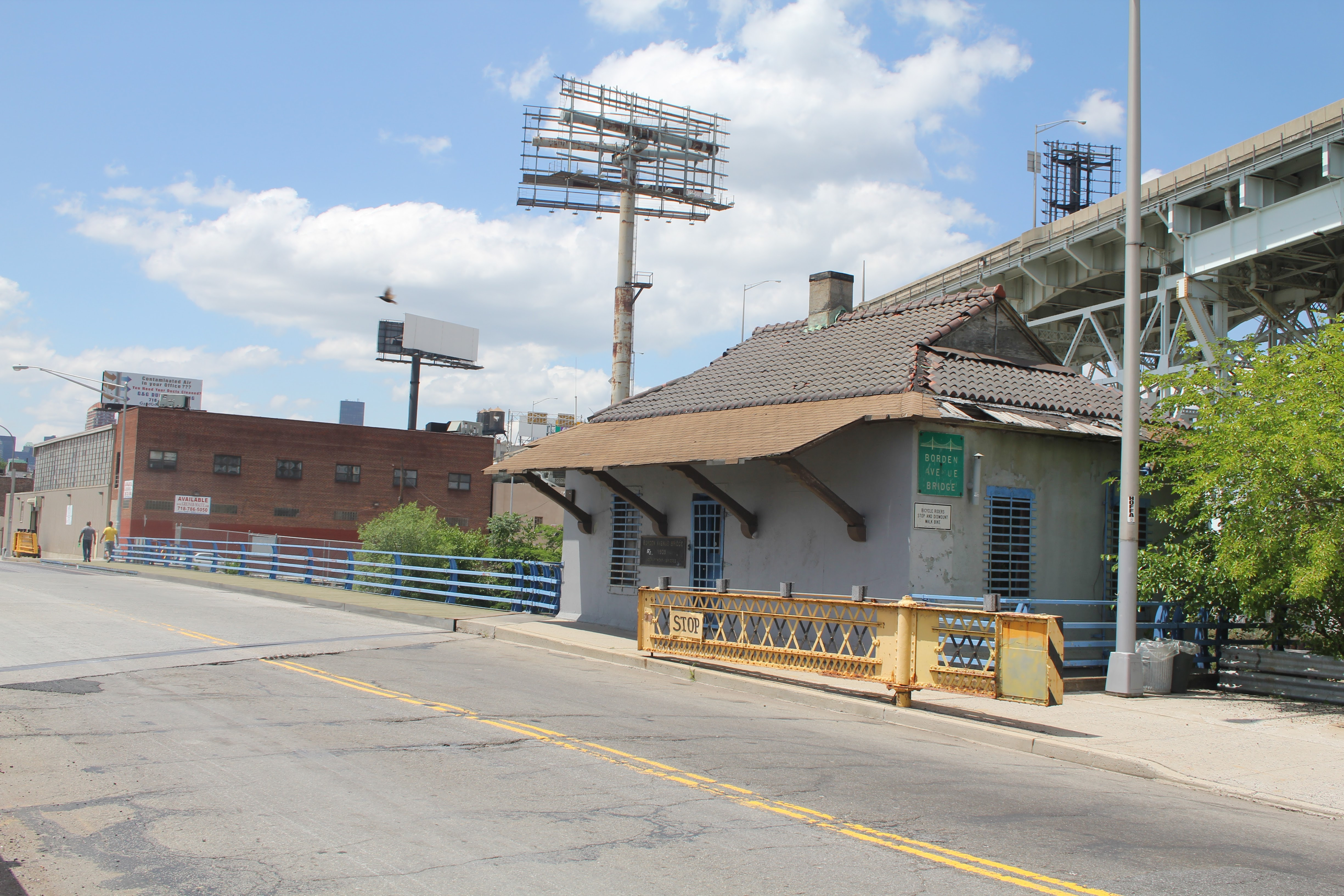
Borden Avenue Bridge in 2014, showing keeper's house and iron gates.
