= Bridge tender =

Occupation

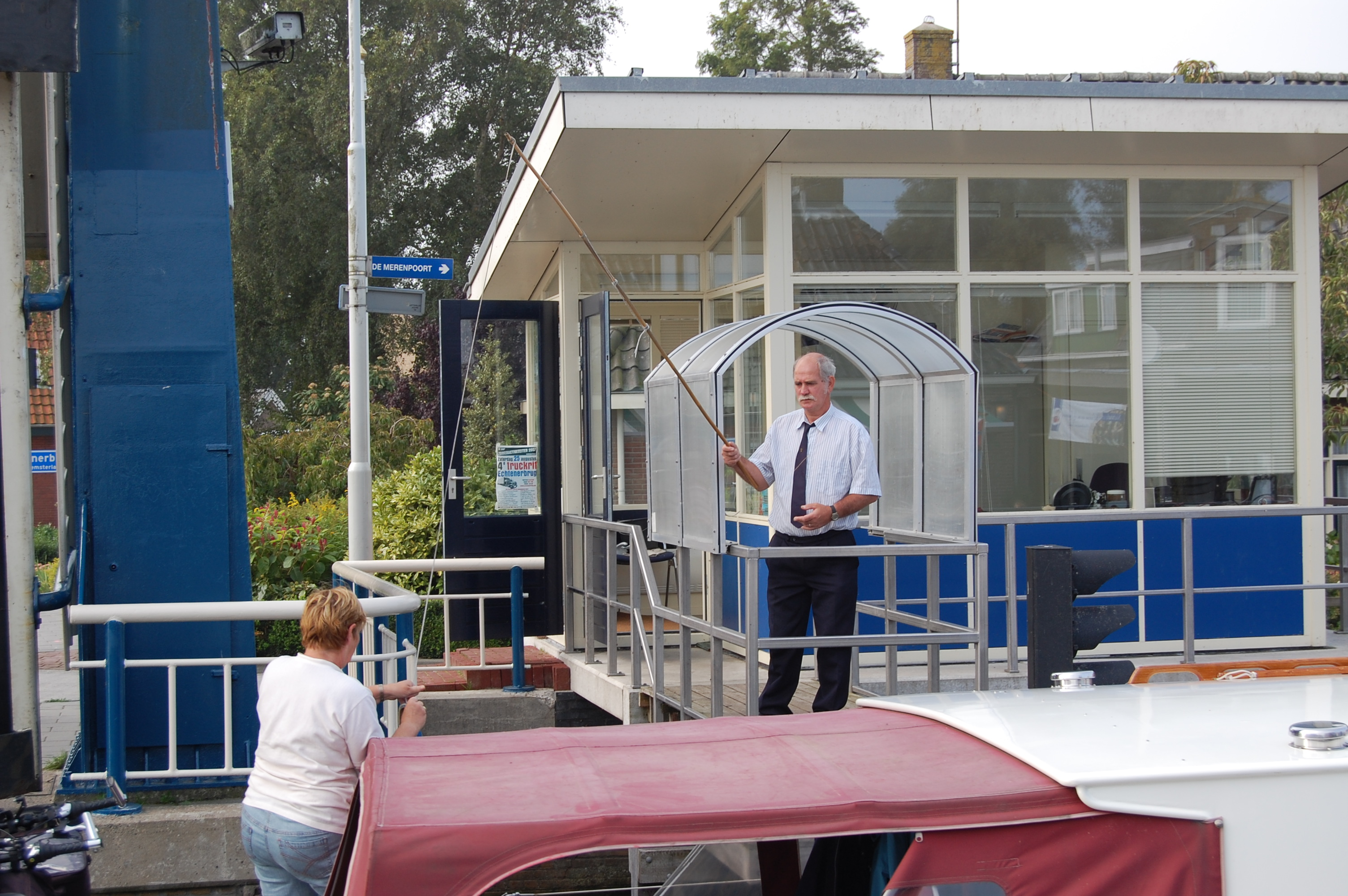
A bridge keeper at Echtenerbrug who traditionally receives passage money (2007)

A bridge tender, also known as a bridge keeper, operates and maintains a bridge to ensure the safe passage of water traffic and vehicle traffic on the bridge. For a railroad bridge, the bridge tender is also responsible for rail traffic safety.

Moveable bridges typically have a bridge tender's house, from which a bridge tender can observe traffic and operate the bridge, and may also be the employee's residence.

== See also ==
- Toll house
- Toll booth
