= Retractable bridge =

Bridge which can slide open

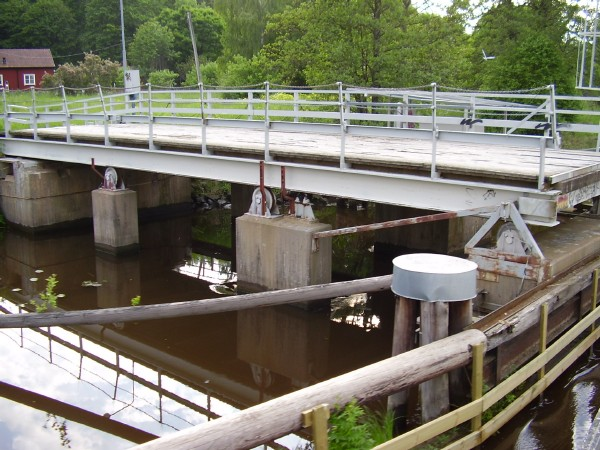
- Vindbron (Ultunabron) in Uppsala (retracted)
- Ancestor: Plate girder bridge
- Related: Lift bridge, submersible bridge, folding bridge
- Descendant: None
- Carries: Automobile, pedestrians
- Span range: Short
- Material: Steel
- Movable: Yes
- Design effort: Medium
- Falsework required: No

A retractable bridge is a type of moveable bridge in which the deck can be rolled or slid backwards to open a gap while traffic crosses, usually a ship on a waterway. This type is sometimes referred to as a thrust bridge.

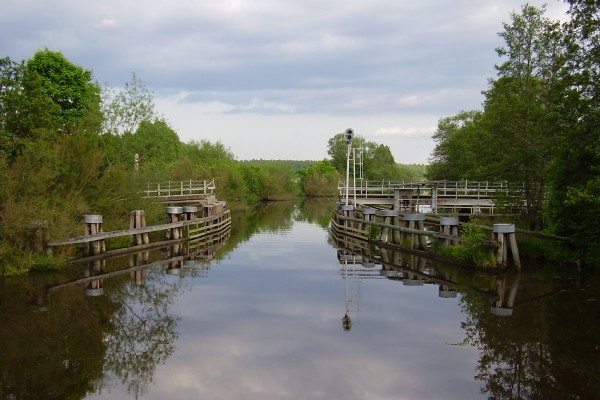
The bridge is retracted to the right.

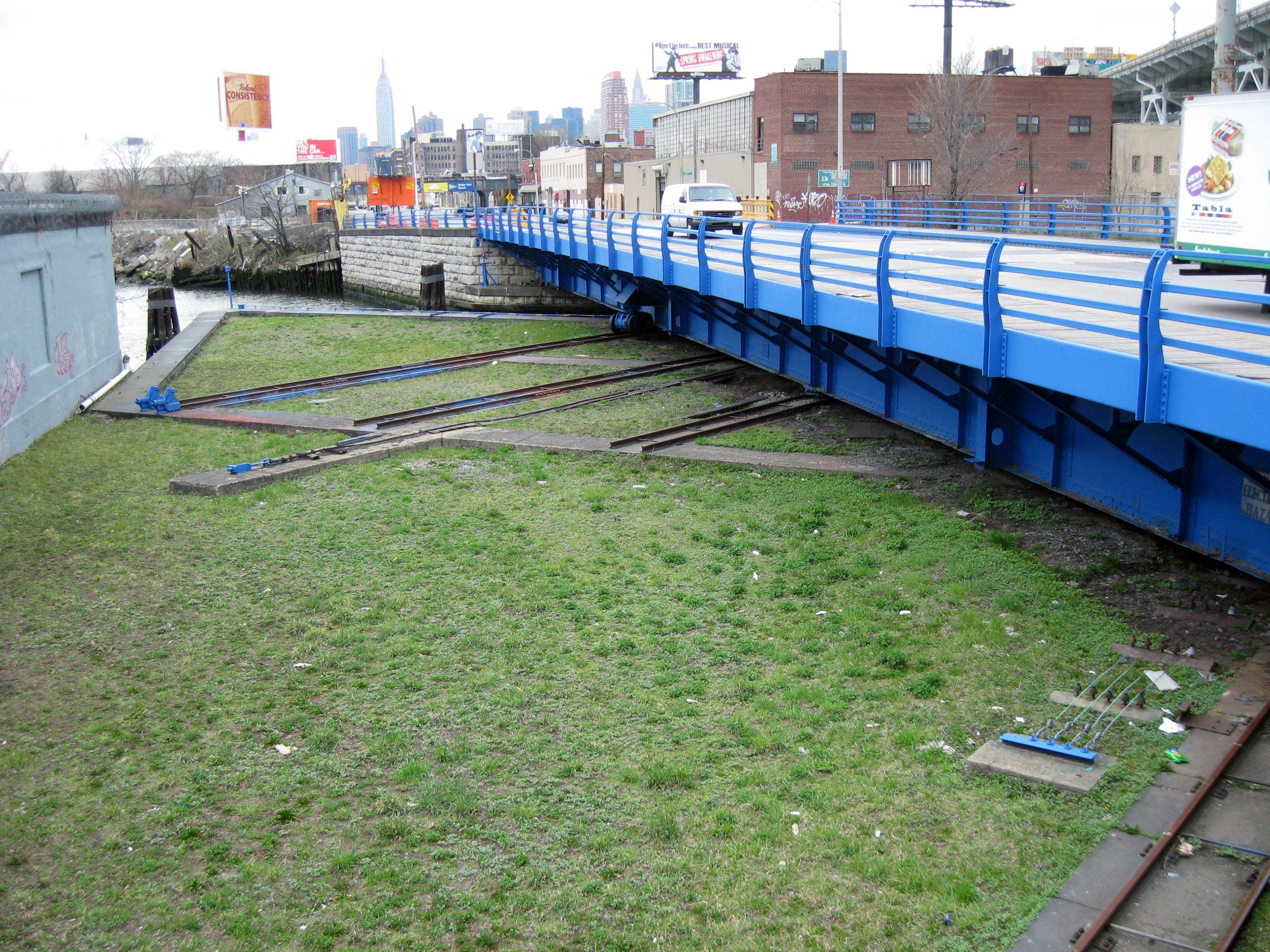
Borden Avenue Bridge, Long Island City

Retractable bridges date back to medieval times. Due to the large dedicated area required for this type of bridge, this design is not common. A retractable design may be considered when the maximum horizontal clearance is required (for example, over a canal).

Two remaining examples exist in New York City: the Carroll Street Bridge (built 1889) in Brooklyn, and the Borden Avenue Bridge in Queens. A recent example can be found at Queen Alexandra Dock in Cardiff, Wales, where the bridge is jacked upwards before being rolled on wheels. Helix Bridge at Paddington Basin in London is a more unusual example of the type, consisting of a glass shell supported in a helical steel frame, which rotates as it retracts. Another example is Inderhavnsbroen ('The Inner Harbour Bridge') in Copenhagen, Denmark, completed in 2016.

The Summer Street Bridge over Fort Point Channel in Boston is a variant type called a retractile bridge. This bridge is oriented northwest–southeast, with the northwest-bound lanes of traffic retracting diagonally to the north, and the southeast-bound lanes retracting diagonally to the west. However, the draws of this bridge have been fixed in place since 1959.

Some retractable bridges are also floating bridges, such as the Hood Canal Bridge. Two other floating bridges in Washington state used to have retractable spans but were replaced with new floating bridges without retractable spans: the Evergreen Point Floating Bridge (replaced in 2016) and Lacey V. Murrow Memorial Bridge (replaced after it accidentally sank in 1990). This design is popular in Guyana, which has the Demerara Harbour Bridge and the Berbice Bridge.

Historical examples of designs for retractable bridges include those by Leonardo da Vinci and Agostino Ramelli.

In the Netherlands, especially in the province of South Holland, a vlotbrug is a design of retractable bridge across a canal in which the roadway floats and can be retracted under fixed structures on the canal banks.

== See also ==
Animation of operation

- Guthrie rolling bridge
- Moveable bridges for a list of other movable bridge types
