= Lost Arles sketchbook =

Purported sketchbook by Vincent van Gogh

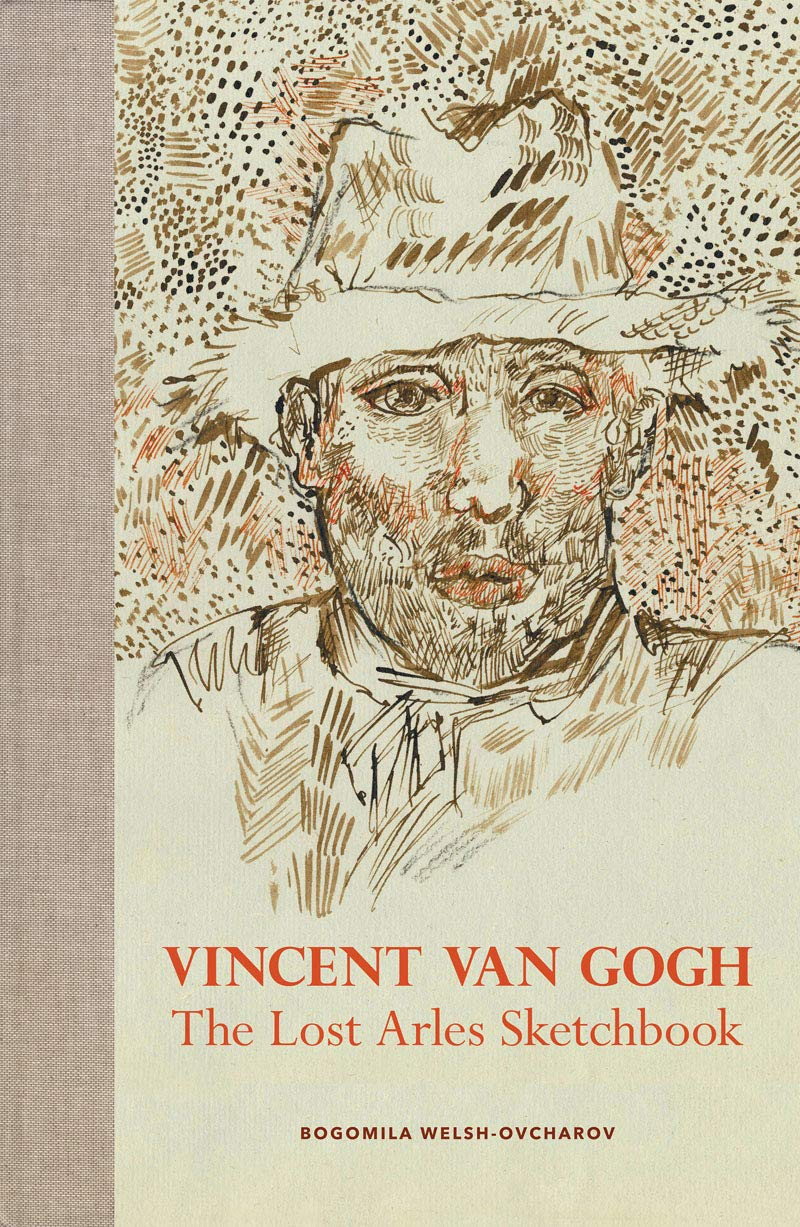
Vincent van Gogh: The Lost Arles Sketchbook, Abrams edition, 2016.

The lost Arles sketchbook is a purported sketchbook of drawings by the Dutch artist Vincent van Gogh. The attribution of the drawings by the art historian Bogomila Welsh-Ovcharov to Van Gogh has been disputed.

The sketchbook was published in 2016 as Vincent van Gogh: The Lost Arles Sketchbook, by Welsh-Ovcharov with a foreword by Ronald Pickvance. It was published in French by Éditions de Seuil and in English by Abrams Books.

== Discovery ==
In 2007 a Dutch art collector approached Teio Meedendorp, a senior researcher at the Van Gogh Museum in Amsterdam, with photographs of 21 sketches he had purchased for "a low price" on the internet auction site eBay. Meedendorp told him that he did not believe they were by Vincent van Gogh. The French art expert Franck Bailie was later informed about the existence of the sketchbook by a friend and met a family member of the owner. He later said that he "felt straight away that these were genuine".

Bailie subsequently approached the Van Gogh Museum in 2008 with 35 other sketches from the book. He was accompanied by a member of the family of the owner of the sketchbook, and was informed by the museum of their doubts about their authenticity. Bailie then approached the art historian Bogomila Welsh-Ovcharov and invited her to investigate the authenticity of the sketches. She recalled that her " ... first feeling was an incredible overwhelming feeling that I know what I have in my hands ... But then, of course, I knew I needed to do the scholarship". She said that she had taken three years to authenticate the works and later described them as the "most revolutionary discovery in [the] entire history of Van Gogh's oeuvre".

Art historian Ronald Pickvance said that the drawings were " ... absolutely O.K., from one to 65 ... End of song, end of story".

== Ginoux narrative ==
A narrative of the sketchbook's survival was described by Welsh-Ovcharov. She said that the sketchbook, a commercial ledger, had been given to Van Gogh in 1888 by Joseph and Marie Ginoux who owned the Cafe de la Gare in Arles. He sketched the Provençal landscape around Arles in the ledger and continued to work in it during his stay at a mental asylum in Saint Remy. In May 1890 he asked his doctor to return items to the Ginoux family, these included the sketchbook. The delivery of the ledger was recorded in a notebook at the Cafe de la Gare. The Ginoux family owned the sketchbook until 1944. It was then inherited by a niece of the Ginoux family, Marguerite Crevoulin. The cafe was subsequently bought by the Basso family, the owner of the sketchbook in 2016 told Welsh-Ovcharov that her mother's sister became a member of the Basso family upon marriage. The sketchbook and the book containing details of the sketchbooks donation were "recovered" from a home belonging to the Ginoux family by a neighbour who gave them to her daughter as a birthday present in the 1960s. The daughter was the owner of the sketchbook in 2016.

Welsh-Ovcharov said that she had told her that "My mother found the large book of drawings...and knowing nothing about art and with no artistic education, she had no idea of the importance of this discovery. She gave it to me on my 20th birthday and it was put away in a cupboard". Welsh-Ovcharov described the owners as "very simple people and it was just by quirk of fate that they showed it to someone in the region who knew a local art specialist ... They took 30 of them and ripped them out of the book".

== Refutation of Ginoux narrative ==
The Van Gogh Museum said that the purported survival of the sketchbook was "highly improbable" and that the "drawing style of the maker of the drawings in the lost Arles sketchbook is, in the opinion of our experts, monotonous, clumsy and spiritless". The ink used in the drawings is brown while Van Gogh typically used black or purple ink according to the museum. Meedendorp said that discrepancies were apparent from the dates recorded in the notebook of the cafe. On 20 May 1890 Van Gogh's doctor brought a large book of drawings to the cafe, detailed in the notebook as "Monsieur Doctor Rey left for M. and Mme. Ginoux from the painter Van Goghe [sic] some empty olive boxes and a bundle of checked towels as well as a large book of drawings and apologizes for the delay". In 2013 the museum had been shown pictures of the notebook that referenced 19 June 1890, yet the book The Lost Arles Sketchbook of 2016 included a reference to 10 June 1890. The museum said "We would very much like to know how this is possible ... How reliable is the notebook if exactly the same statement can be found on two different dates?".

The publisher of the Lost Arles Sketchbook, Editions du Seuil, said they had " ... not changed our minds and are very happy that from now on everybody can make their own opinion after seeing the drawings and reading the analysis".

Bailie said that the Van Gogh Museum had acted unethically and that "You would expect experts to act scientifically but they have never had these photos in their hands except for 50 minutes ... Unfortunately their arguments do not have a lot of density. They are safeguarding their perimeter".

== Description ==
The sketchbook is a "commercial ledger with high-quality paper" which contains 65 drawings in reed pen that depict studies of the landscape of Provence, and apparent preparatory sketches of paintings by Van Gogh. A self-portrait of Van Gogh and a portrait of Paul Gauguin are also included. The Yellow House and Langlois Bridge and the sea at Saintes-Maries-de-la-Mer are also depicted.

The valuation of the works ranged from "tens of millions" of pounds if they were authentic, to nothing if they are not.

== Reception ==
The sketches were described as "imitations" by the Van Gogh Museum upon their 2016 presentation. Louis van Tilborgh, a senior researcher at the museum said that "In our opinion, it's not authentic ... Owners of the sketchbook have asked our opinion in 2007 and 2012 again, and we studied the iconography, style and technique, and studied the provenance, and we came to the conclusion that it’s not by him. We have not changed our opinion".

Van Gogh's supposed creation of the sketchbook was portrayed in the 2018 film At Eternity's Gate, directed by Julian Schnabel and starring Willem Dafoe as Van Gogh. The inclusion of the sketchbook in the film was criticized by the art historian Martin Bailey. Bailey describes the drawings as "weakly drawn, derivative works". He disputes the 2016 discovery of the drawings having previously been shown some of them in 2010. Schnabel said in an interview with The Times that the authenticity of the drawings is "irrelevant" and "they were pretty damn good".

== See also ==
- List of works by Vincent van Gogh
