= Langlois Bridge =

French bridge

Coordinates: 43°39′25″N 4°37′16″E

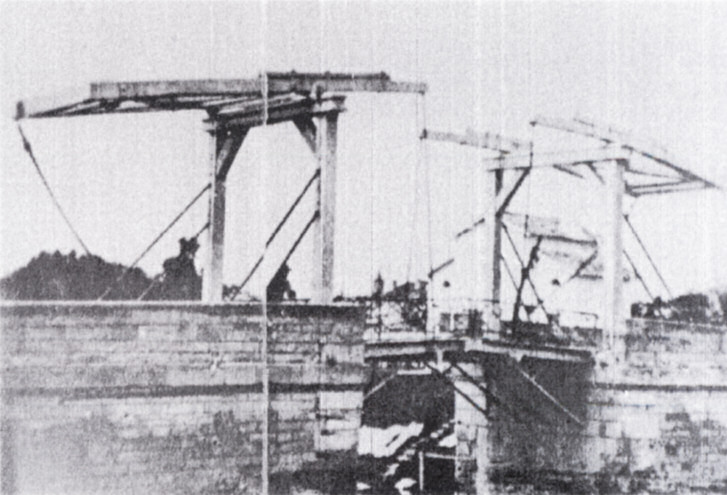
1902 photograph of the Langlois Bridge

The Langlois Bridge (French: Pont de Langlois) was a double-beam drawbridge in Arles, France, which was the subject of several paintings by Vincent van Gogh in 1888. Being one of eleven drawbridges built by a Dutch engineer along the channel from Arles to Port-de-Bouc, this bridge might have reminded the artist of his homeland.

== History ==
New canals were opened up in southern France as they were needed to expand the network of canals. In the 19th century a canal was built from Arles to Bouc, located on the Mediterranean Sea. Locks and bridges were built, too, to manage water and road traffic. Just outside Arles, the first bridge was the officially titled "Pont de Réginelle" but better known by the keeper's name as "Pont de Langlois".

In 1930, the original drawbridge was replaced by a reinforced concrete structure which, in 1944, was blown up by the retreating Germans who destroyed all the other bridges along the canal except for the one at Fos. The Fos Bridge was dismantled in 1959 with a view to relocating it on the site of the Langlois Bridge but as a result of structural difficulties, it was finally reassembled at Montcalde Lock several kilometers away from the original site.

A reconstructed bridge of the Langlois Bridge, named "Pont Van Gogh" (Van Gogh bridge), recognizing the works that Van Gogh made of the bridge, is owned by the Arles tourist board.

== Depiction in art ==
Vincent van Gogh made several paintings, a watercolor and drawings of the Langlois bridge in a series now titled Langlois Bridge at Arles.

Gallery

Langlois Bridge

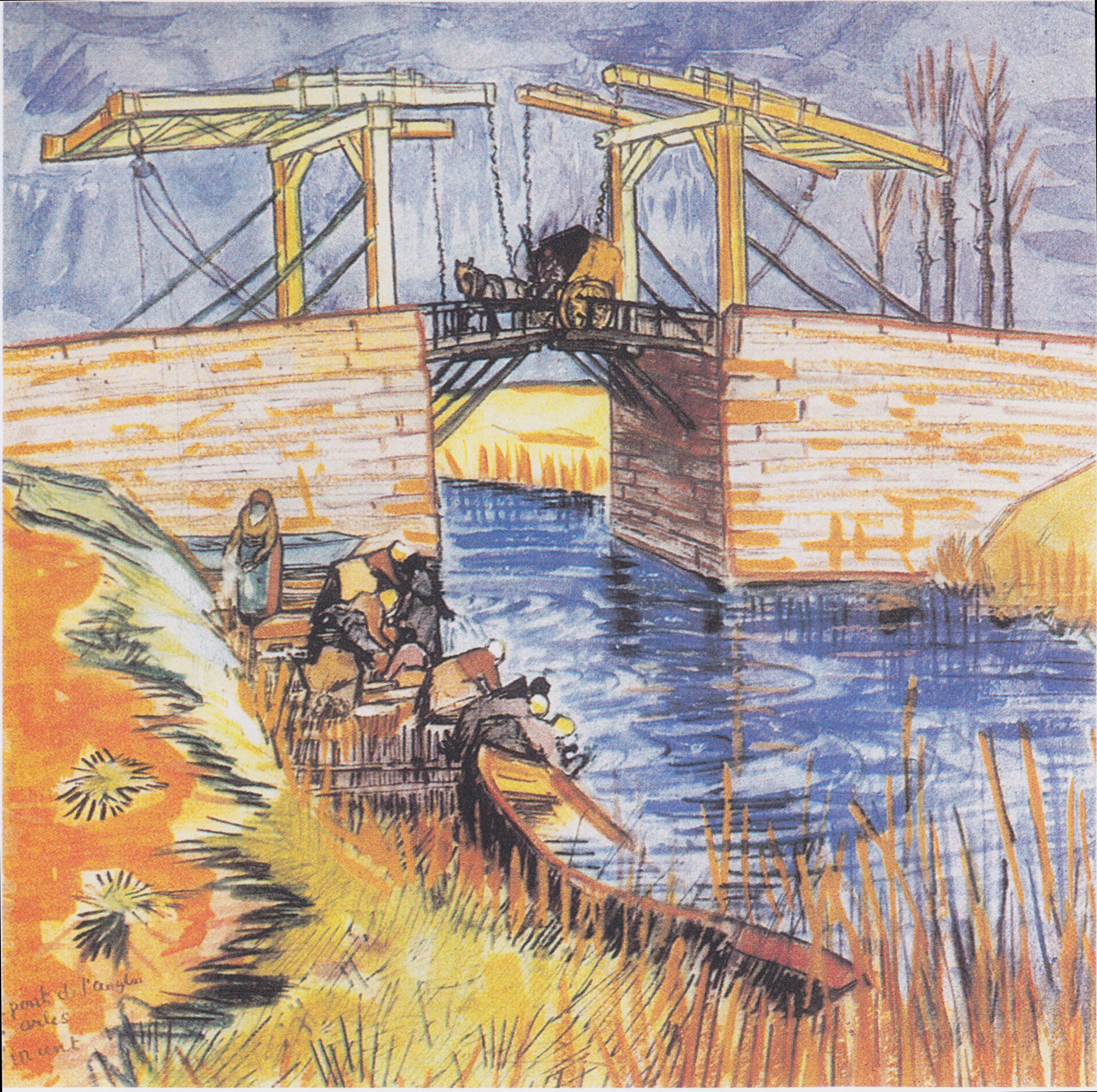
Langlois Bridge at Arles, watercolor. 1888. Private collection (F1480)

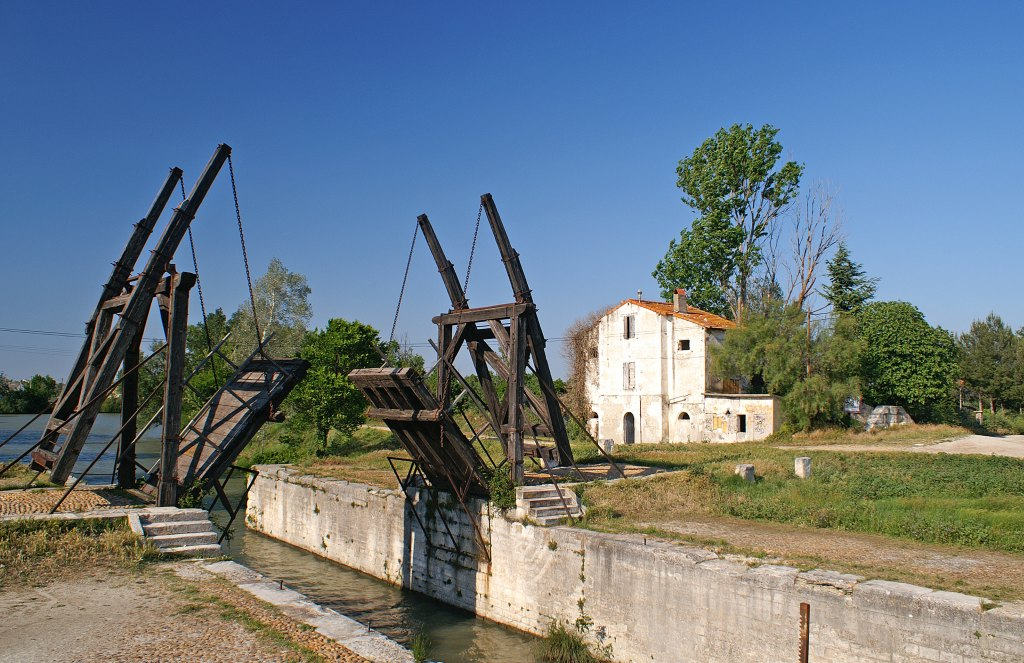
Pont Van Gogh, replica of the Langlois Bridge

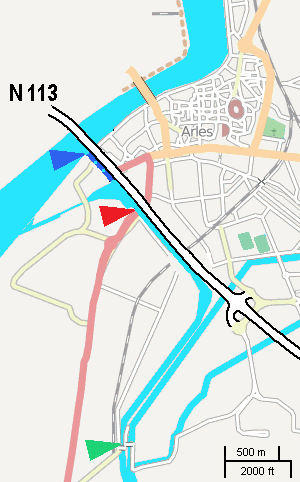
Pont de Langlois (red) and Pont Van Gogh (green); entrance of the canal in 1888 (blue)

== See also ==
- Double-beam drawbridge
- Drawbridge
- nl:Ophaalbrug, a counterweighted double-beam drawbridge used in the Netherlands
