= Self-portrait (van Gogh, Paris) =

Painting by Vincent van Gogh

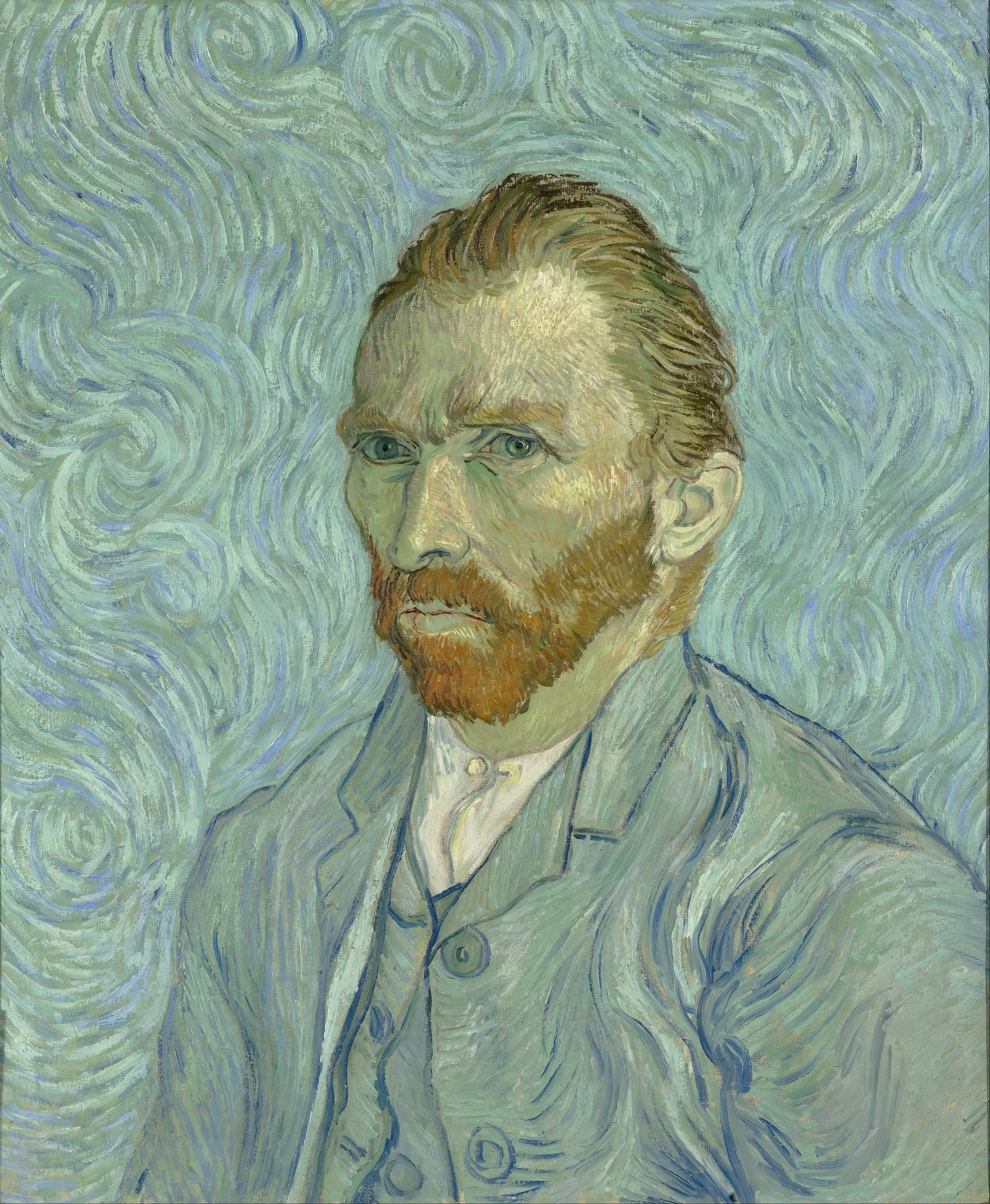
- Artist: Vincent van Gogh
- Year: 1889
- Medium: Oil on canvas
- Dimensions: 65 cm × 54 cm (26 in × 21 in)
- Location: Musée d'Orsay, Paris

The Dutch Post-Impressionist painter Vincent van Gogh painted a self-portrait in oil on canvas in September 1889. The work, which may have been his last self-portrait, was painted shortly before he left Saint-Rémy-de-Provence in southern France. It is now in the collection of the Musée d'Orsay in Paris.

This self-portrait was one of about 32 produced by van Gogh over a 10-year period, and these were an important part of his work as a painter; he painted himself because he often lacked the money to pay for models. He took the painting with him to Auvers-sur-Oise, near Paris, where he showed it to Dr. Paul Gachet, who, according to van Gogh, was "absolutely fanatical" about it.

Art historians are divided as to whether this painting or the self-portrait without a beard in a private collection is van Gogh's final self-portrait. The art historians Ingo F. Walther and Jan Hulsker consider this to be the last, with Hulsker believing that it was painted in Arles following van Gogh's admission to hospital after mutilating his ear, whereas Ronald Pickvance considers the self-portrait without a beard to be the later painting.

Van Gogh sent the picture to his younger brother, the art dealer Theo; an accompanying letter read, "You will need to study [the picture] for a time. I hope you will notice that my facial expressions have become much calmer, although my eyes have the same insecure look as before, or so it appears to me." Walther and Rainer Metzger consider that "the picture is not a pretty pose nor a realistic record ... [it is] one that has seen too much jeopardy, too much turmoil, to be able to keep its agitation and trembling under control". According to Sister Wendy Beckett the dissolving colours and turbulent patterns signal a feeling of strain and pressure, symbolising the artist's state of mind, which is under a mental, physical and emotional pressure.

The Musée d'Orsay notes that "the model's immobility contrasts with the undulating hair and beard, echoed and amplified in the hallucinatory arabesques of the background".

== See also ==
- Self-portrait (van Gogh, Oslo)
- Portraits of Vincent van Gogh
- List of works by Vincent van Gogh

=== Sources ===
- Beckett, Wendy (1994). The Story of Painting, The Essential Guide to the History of Western Art. Dorling Kidersley. ISBN 978-0751301335.
- Denvir, Bernard (1994). Vincent: The Complete Self-Portraits. Philadelphia, PA: Running Press. ISBN 978-0-7624-0094-2.
- Pickvance, Ronald (1986). Van Gogh in Saint-Rémy and Auvers. New York: Abrams. ISBN 0-87099-477-8.
- Walther, Ingo; Metzger, Rainer (2000). Van Gogh: The Complete Paintings. Cologne: Taschen. ISBN 978-3-8228-1215-0.
- Walther, Ingo (2000). Van Gogh. Cologne: Taschen. ISBN 978-3-8228-6322-0.
