= Self-portrait without beard =

Painting by Vincent van Gogh

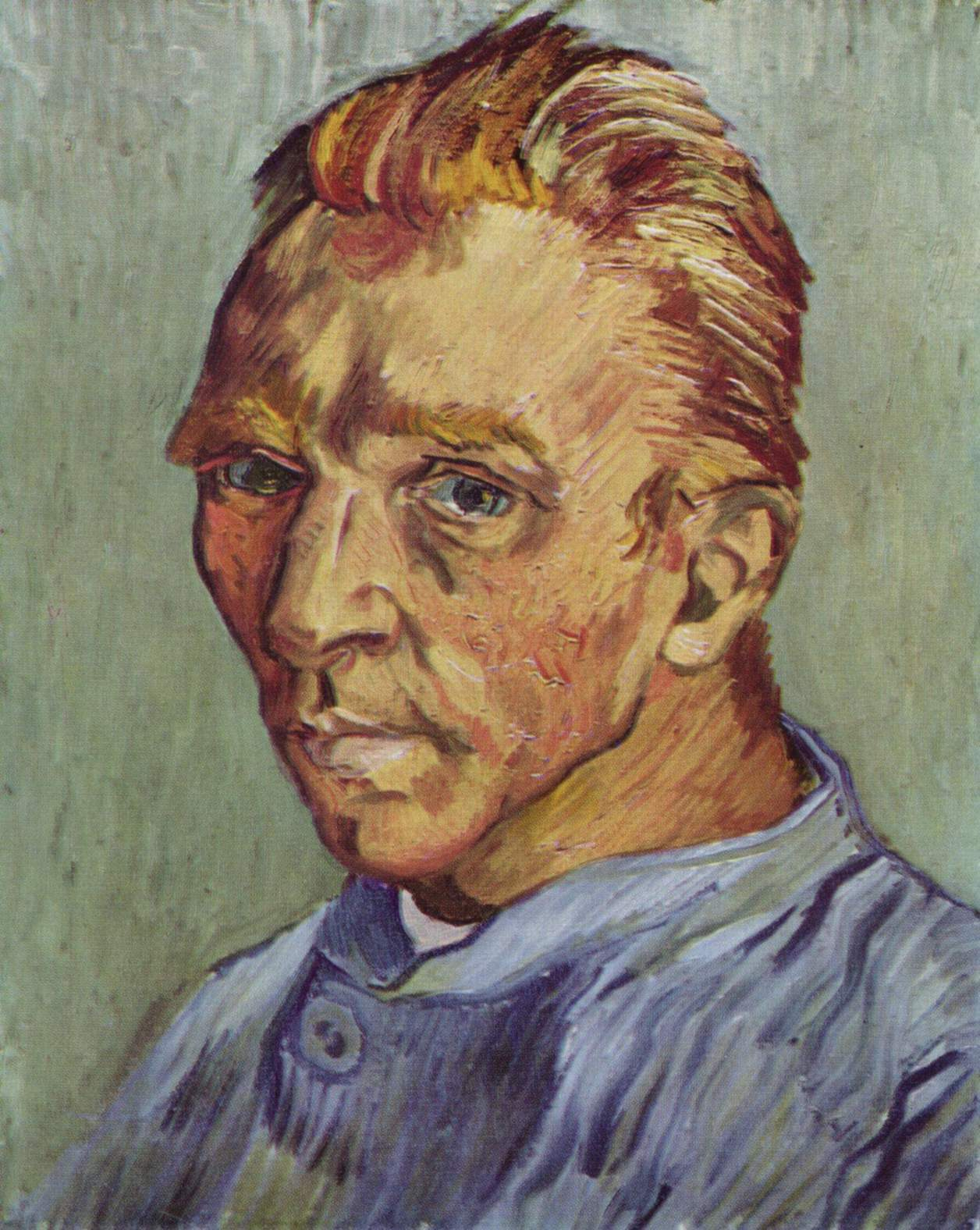
- Artist: Vincent van Gogh
- Year: 1889
- Medium: Oil on canvas
- Dimensions: 65 cm × 54 cm (26 in × 21 in)

Self-portrait without beard, also known as Peasant of Zundert, is an 1889 oil on canvas painting by the Post-Impressionist artist Vincent van Gogh. The picture, which may have been Van Gogh's last self-portrait, was painted in September that year. The self-portrait is one of the most expensive paintings of all time, selling for $71.5 million in 1998 in New York City. At the time, it was the third (or an inflation-adjusted fourth) most expensive painting ever sold.

Art historians are divided as to whether this painting or the 1889 self-portrait in the Musée d'Orsay is Van Gogh's final self-portrait. Ronald Pickvance considered this to be the last, whilst Ingo F. Walther and Jan Hulsker think Self-portrait was the later painting. It was given by van Gogh to his mother as a birthday gift.

== See also ==
- Self-portraiture
- List of works by Vincent van Gogh
- Art movement
- Impressionists
- Paul Gauguin
