= Self-portrait (van Gogh, Oslo) =

Painting by Vincent van Gogh

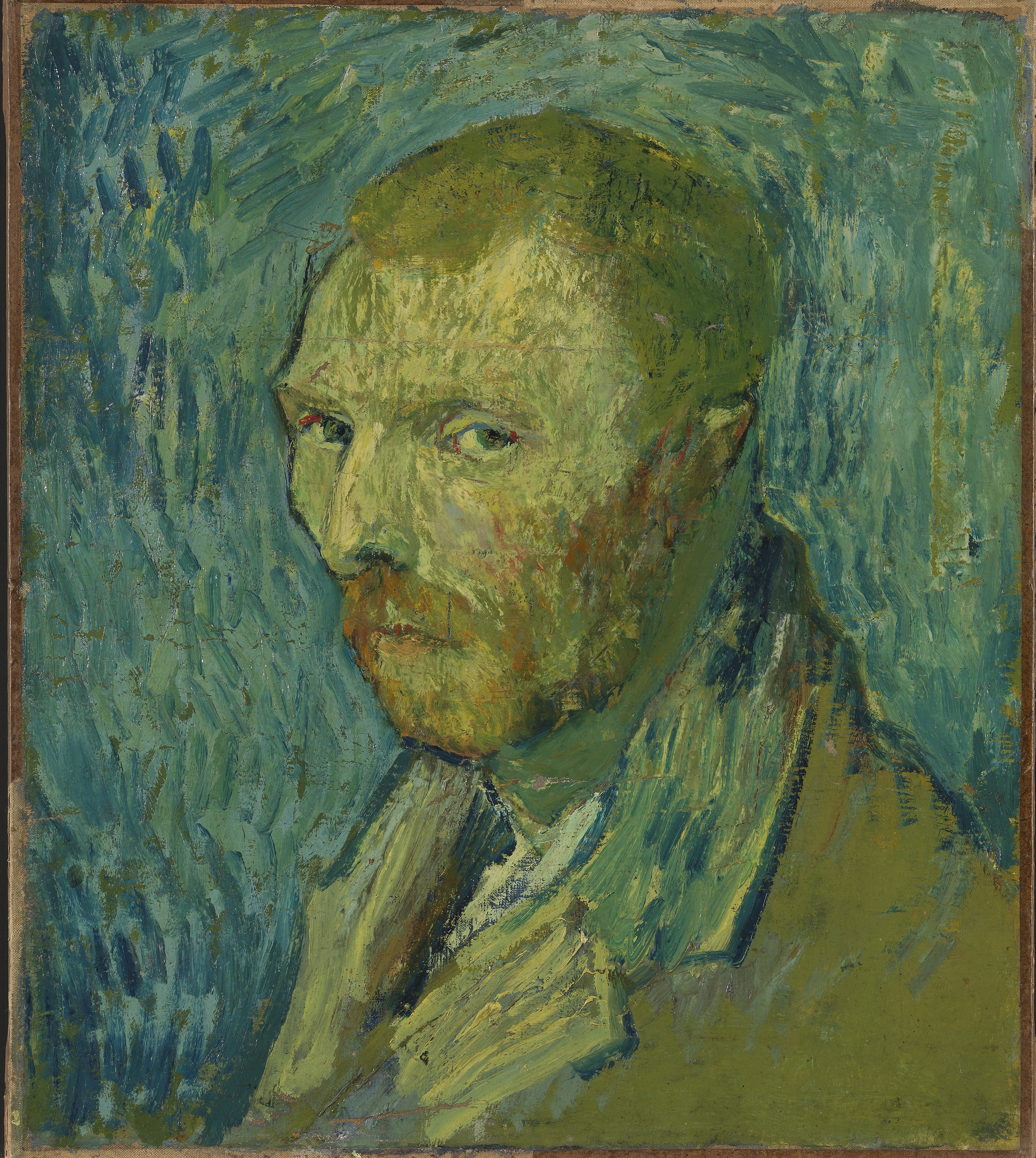
- Artist: Vincent van Gogh
- Year: 1889
- Medium: Oil on canvas
- Dimensions: 51.5 cm × 45 cm (20.3 in × 18 in)
- Location: National Museum, Oslo

The Self-portrait by Vincent van Gogh in the National Museum of Norway in Oslo was authenticated in 2020 by the Van Gogh Museum in Amsterdam. This painting, with the artist looking sideways, was painted while van Gogh was in the asylum in Saint-Rémy-de-Provence and is "unmistakeably" his work. Experts believe that it was painted after van Gogh's letter of 22 August 1889, which indicated that he was still "disturbed" but ready to begin painting again. It was completed prior to his letter of 20 September 1889, in which van Gogh referred to the self-portrait as "an attempt from when I was ill".

The Van Gogh Museum's report stated that "[t]he Oslo self-portrait depicts someone who is mentally ill; his timid, sideways glance is easily recognisable and is often found in patients suffering from depression and psychosis".

== See also ==
- Self-portrait (van Gogh, Paris)
- Portraits of Vincent van Gogh
