= Double-beam drawbridge =

Movable bridge type

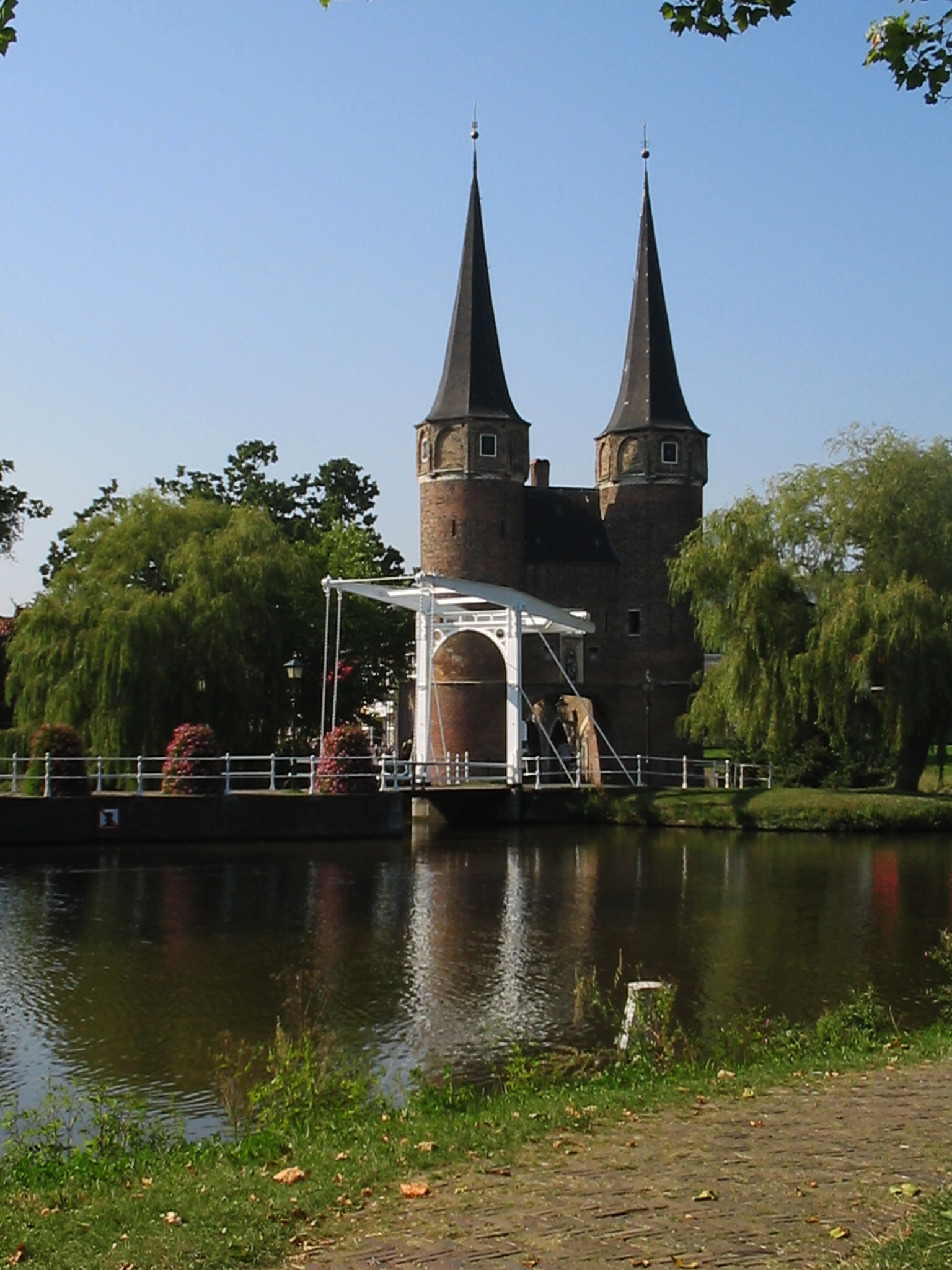
Double-beam drawbridge in Delft

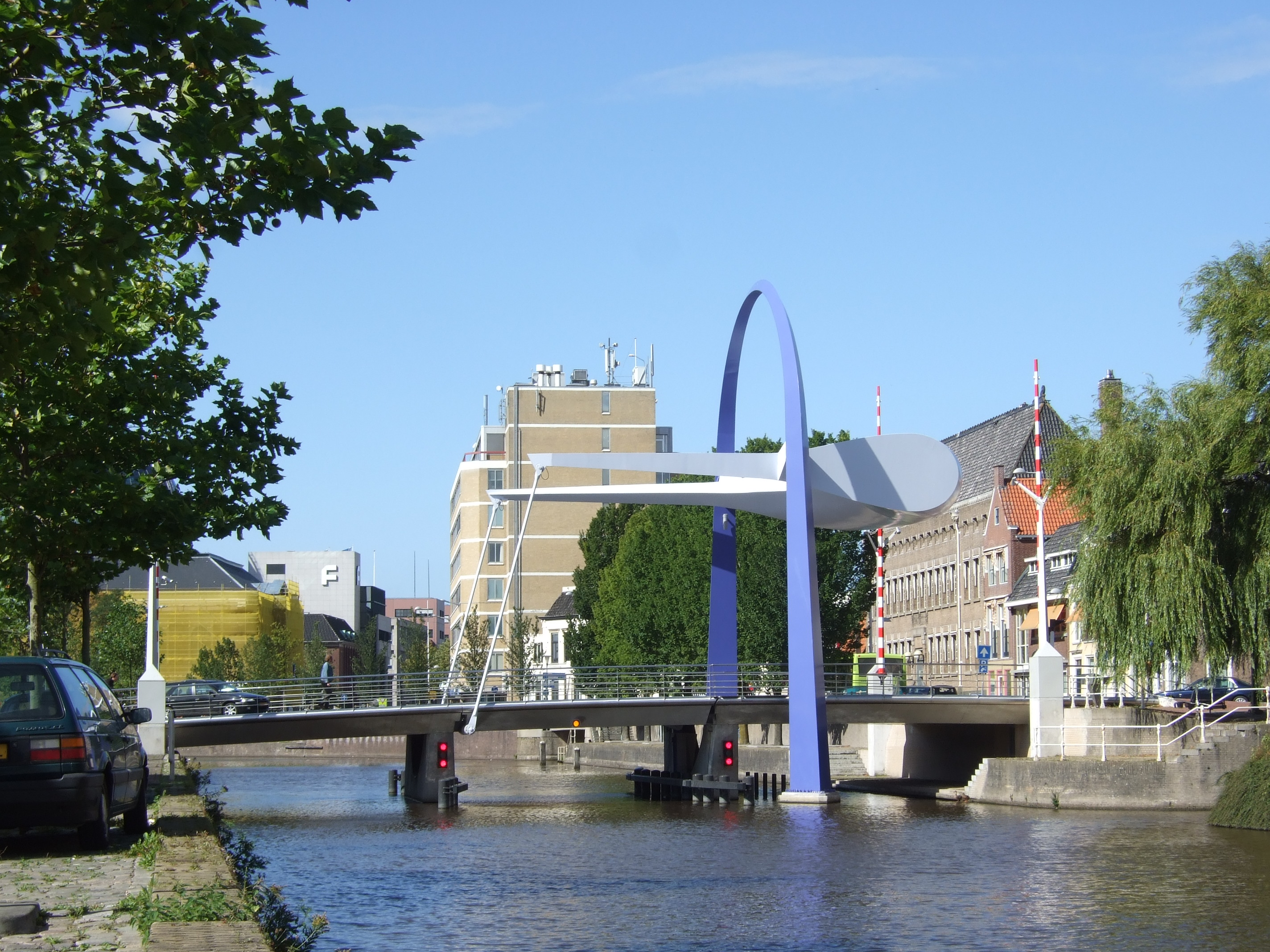
The Poortbrug in Leeuwarden bridges the former city moat

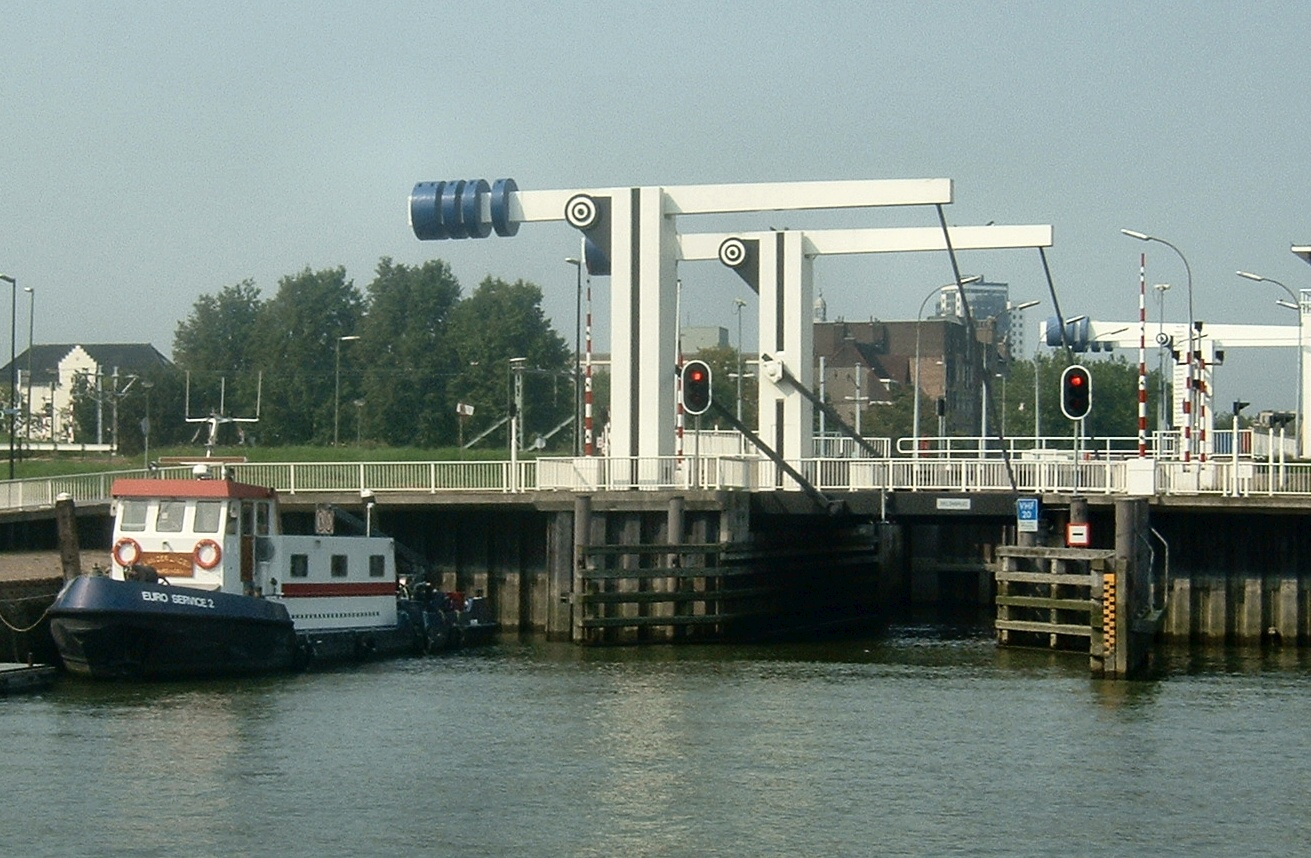
Double-beam drawbridge in Vlaardingen

A double-beam drawbridge, seesaw or folding bridge is a movable bridge . It opens by rotation about a horizontal axis parallel to the water. Historically, the double-beam drawbridge has emerged from the drawbridge. A (double-beam) drawbridge has counterweights, so that operating requires less energy compared with such a bridge without counterweights.

As a bascule bridge, the (double-beam) drawbridge has multiple hinges. The road surface is connected to the bottom hinge close to street level. Above the hinge is a portal. A rotating arm, the balance, is attached to the portal high up off the ground. On one side of the balance hangs the counterweight, the balance box, on the other side, the arm is hinged to two vertical beams that are on the other end hinged to the tip of the bridge deck. So when the bridge goes up, the balance and the bridge deck turn approximately parallel.

The movement of the combined beams have the characteristics of a four-bar linkage.

The drawback of a traditional double-beam drawbridge is that it has a limited clearance height. That is why the balance box sometimes does not hang between the two arms, but on the arms themselves, without the arms being connected to each other. So there are two balance boxes.

Many variants have been made on the basic design of the double-beam drawbridge. They are both double-rotating (with two separate bridge decks) and single-rotating and with a diagonal bridge deck. In the latter case, there is only one tower which is aside from the road.

The pivot point of the balance with the balance box can either next to the gate (as in the photo), or directly above it. The latter system is referred to as an "Amsterdam type". The advantage of this is that the tower is only loaded under pressure. When the pivot point falls behind the column, the tower is loaded eccentrically; this gives both pressure and flexion.

When double-beam drawbridges are opened and closed electrically, an electric motor with a gear is often located at about half height in the portal styles. This engages in a rack that is hinged to the bridge deck. This construction can also be seen in the photo. The rack is often not straight, but with a curvature at the end, like a hockey stick—this is to give the electric motor time to rev up and gradually raise (and lower) the bridge.

== See also ==
- Bascule bridge
- Folding bridge
- Langlois Bridge, an example of a French bridge of this type, painted by Van Gogh
- Moveable bridges for a list of other moveable bridge types

== Sources ==
Henk de Jong and Nico Muyen (1995). 2000 years of movable bridges: international guide to known and unknown bridge types and movement works (in Dutch). Rijswijk: Elmar Publishers. ISBN 90 389 0286 7.
