= Langlois Bridge at Arles =

Series of paintings by Vincent van Gogh

Coordinates: 43.656947°N 4.621028°E

The Langlois Bridge at Arles
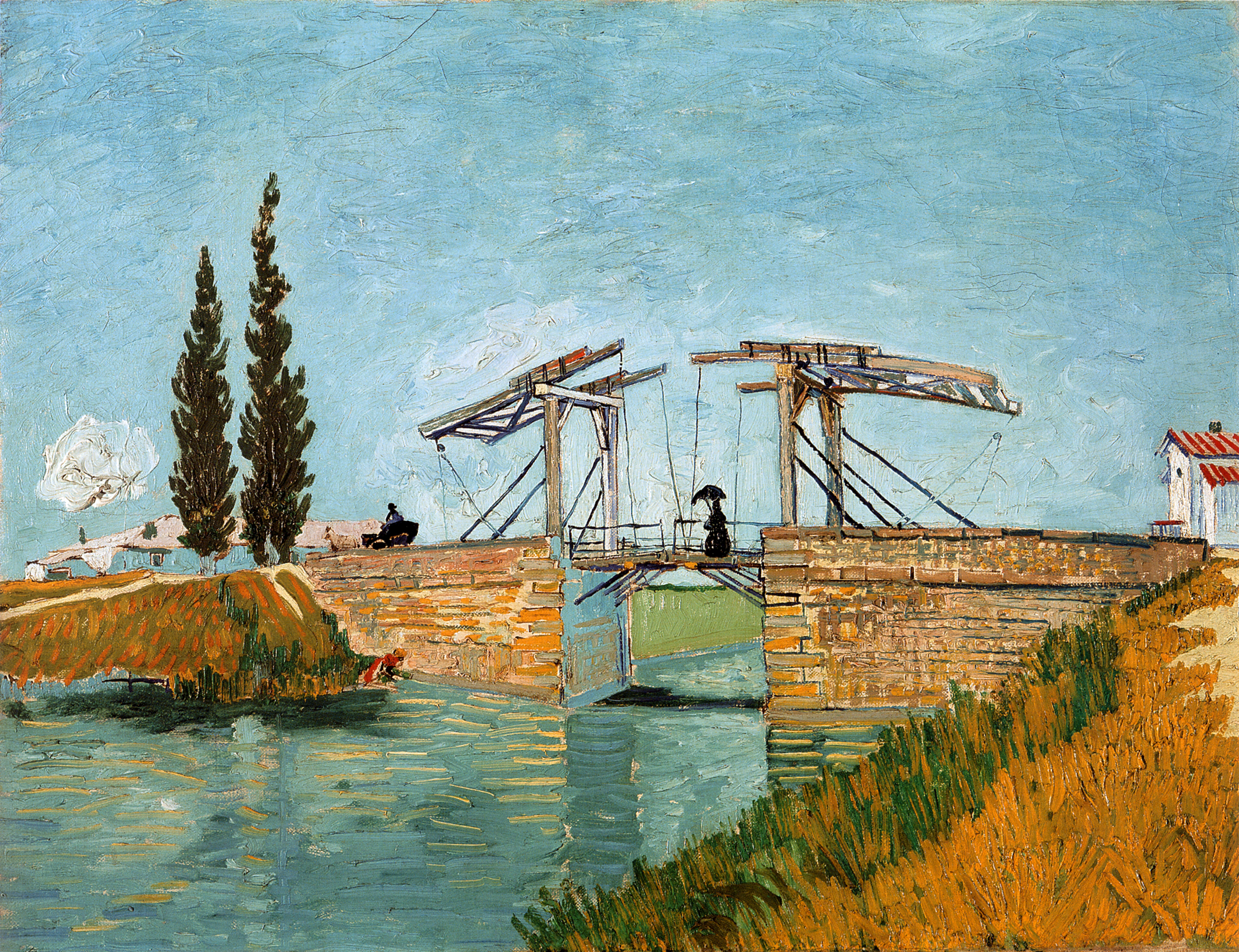
- Artist: Vincent van Gogh
- Year: 1888
- Medium: Oil on canvas
- Dimensions: 49.5 cm × 64.5 cm (19.5 in × 25.4 in)
- Location: Wallraf-Richartz Museum, Cologne, Germany (F570)

The Langlois Bridge at Arles is the subject of four oil paintings, one watercolor and four drawings by Vincent van Gogh. The works, made in 1888 when van Gogh lived in Arles, in southern France, represent a melding of formal and creative aspects. Van Gogh used a perspective frame that he built and used in The Hague to create precise lines and angles when portraying perspective.

Van Gogh was influenced by Japanese woodcut prints, as evidenced by his simplified use of color to create a harmonious and unified image. Contrasting colors, such as blue and yellow, were used to bring a vibrancy to the works. He painted with an impasto, or thickly applied paint, using color to depict the reflection of light. The subject matter, a drawbridge on a canal, reminded him of his homeland in the Netherlands. He asked his brother Theo to frame and send one of the paintings to an art dealer in the Netherlands. The reconstructed Langlois Bridge is now named Pont Van-Gogh.

== Background ==
=== Arles ===
Van Gogh was 35 when he made the Langlois Bridge paintings and drawings. Living in Arles, in southern France, he was at the height of his career, producing some of his best work: sunflowers, fields, farmhouses and people of the Arles, Nîmes and Avignon areas. It was a prolific time for van Gogh: in less than 15 months he made about 100 drawings, produced more than 200 paintings and wrote more than 200 letters.

The canals, drawbridges, windmills, thatched cottages and expansive fields of the Arles countryside reminded van Gogh of his life in the Netherlands. Arles brought him the solace and bright sun that he sought for himself and conditions to explore painting with more vivid colors, intense color contrasts and varied brushstrokes. He also returned to the roots of his artistic training from the Netherlands, most notably with the use of a reed pen for his drawings.

=== Langlois Bridge ===
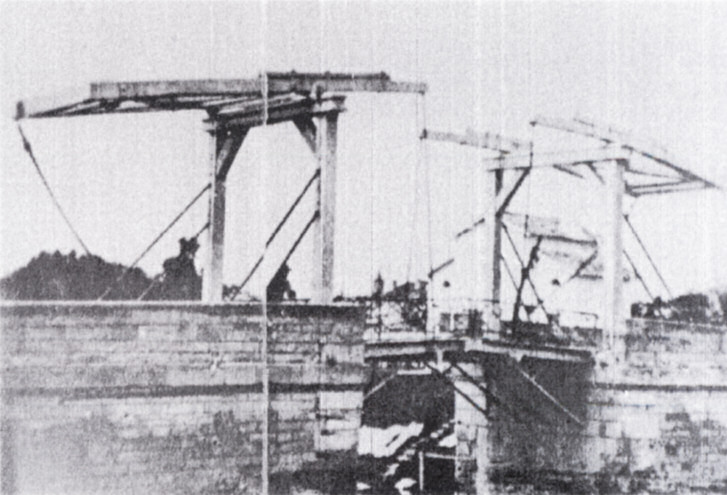
The original drawbridge, 1902. It was replaced by a reinforced-concrete bridge in 1930. At van Gogh's time, it was called Pont de Langlois, Langlois' bridge, after its bridge keeper. The bridge has been relocated and renamed Pont Van-Gogh

The Langlois Bridge was one of the crossings over the Arles to Bouc canal. The double-beam drawbridge was built in the first half of the 19th century to expand the network of canals to the Mediterranean Sea. Locks and bridges were built, too, to manage water and road traffic. Just outside Arles, the first bridge was the officially titled "Pont de Réginel" but better known by the keeper's name as "Pont de Langlois". In 1930, the original drawbridge was replaced by a reinforced concrete structure which, in 1944, was blown up by the retreating Germans who destroyed all the other bridges along the canal except for the one at Fos-sur-Mer, a port on the Mediterranean Sea. The Fos Bridge was dismantled in 1959 with a view to relocating it on the site of the Langlois Bridge but as a result of structural difficulties, it was finally reassembled at Montcalde Lock several kilometers away from the original site.

According to letters to his brother Theo, van Gogh began a study of women washing clothes near the Langlois Bridge about mid-March 1888 and was working on another painting of the bridge about 2 April. This was the first of several versions he painted of the Langlois Bridge that crossed the Arles canal.

Reflecting on van Gogh's works of the Langlois Bridge Debora Silverman, author of the book Van Gogh and Gauguin: The Search for Sacred Art comments, "Van Gogh's depictions of the bridge have been considered a quaint exercise in nostalgia mingled with Japonist allusions." Van Gogh approached the making of the paintings and drawings about the bridge in a "serious and sustained manner" with attention to "the structure, function, and component parts of this craft mechanism in the landscape."

=== Perspective frame ===
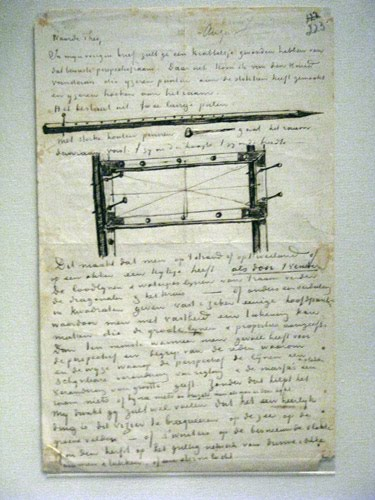
A sketch by Vincent van Gogh which represents his perspective frame

In Arles van Gogh began using again a perspective frame he had built in The Hague. The device was used for outdoor sightings to compare the proportion of items that were near to those that were in the distance. Some of the works of the Langlois Bridge were made with the aid of the frame. Its use "deepened his exploration of the drawbridge as a mechanism."

=== Japanese influence ===
The Langlois Bridge reminded van Gogh of Hiroshige's print Sudden Shower on the Great Bridge. Inspired by the Japanese wood block prints, van Gogh sought to integrate techniques from Japanese artwork into his own. In a letter to Émile Bernard about the Langlois Bridge, he wrote: "If the Japanese are not making any progress in their own country, still it cannot be doubted that their art is being continued in France." With a Japanese aesthetic, van Gogh's Langlois Bridge paintings reflect a simplified use of color to create a harmonious and unified image. Outlines were used to suggest movement. He used fewer shades of colors, preferring multiple subtle color variations. The Langlois Bridge reminded van Gogh of Hiroshige's Sudden Shower on the Great Bridge inspiring him to use blocks of colors, like patterns of yellow against a blue sky, colors chosen to create a sense of vitality of the Japanese prints and the vibrant quality of light in southern France. These approaches created a more powerful impact and depicted the simpler, primitive quality of the country lifestyle.

== Three paintings with similar compositions ==
The Langlois Bridge at Arles with Women Washing is one of van Gogh's most iconic and best loved paintings, acknowledged as the first masterpiece of his Arles period. It depicts common canal-side activities. A little yellow cart crosses the bridge while a group of women in smocks and multicoloured caps wash linen on the shore. Van Gogh skillfully uses his knowledge of color theory and the "law of simultaneous contrasts" in this work. The grass is depicted with alternating brush strokes of red-orange and green. Yellow and blue complementary colors are used in the bridge, sky and river. Use of complementary colors intensifies the impact of each color creating a "vibrant and coloristically unified whole."

Naomi Mauer, author of The Pursuit of Spiritual Wisdom: The Thought and Art of Vincent van Gogh and Paul Gauguin describes van Gogh's technical and artistic execution of this painting.

"Compositionally, the vertical and horizontal geometry of the bridge and its reflection in the water create a great central cross which imparts a classical symmetry and equilibrium to the canvas. This central geometric framework, which is echoed and enclosed by the bands of sky above and the bank below, is relieved and enlivened by the great undulating sweep of the hill and shore, the round knot of washerwomen amid the circular ripples of the water, and the flexible, slightly curved grasses at the right. Both formally and chromatically, the Bridge of Langlois demonstrates Vincent's abstraction of nature to its essential coloristic and formal elements, and his creation from these components of a harmoniously interwoven unity in which humanity and its works are perfectly integrated."

For The Langlois Bridge at Arles (watercolor) van Gogh manages to create precise details of the bridge, such as the hardware, iron supports, braces and chain pulleys with watercolor.

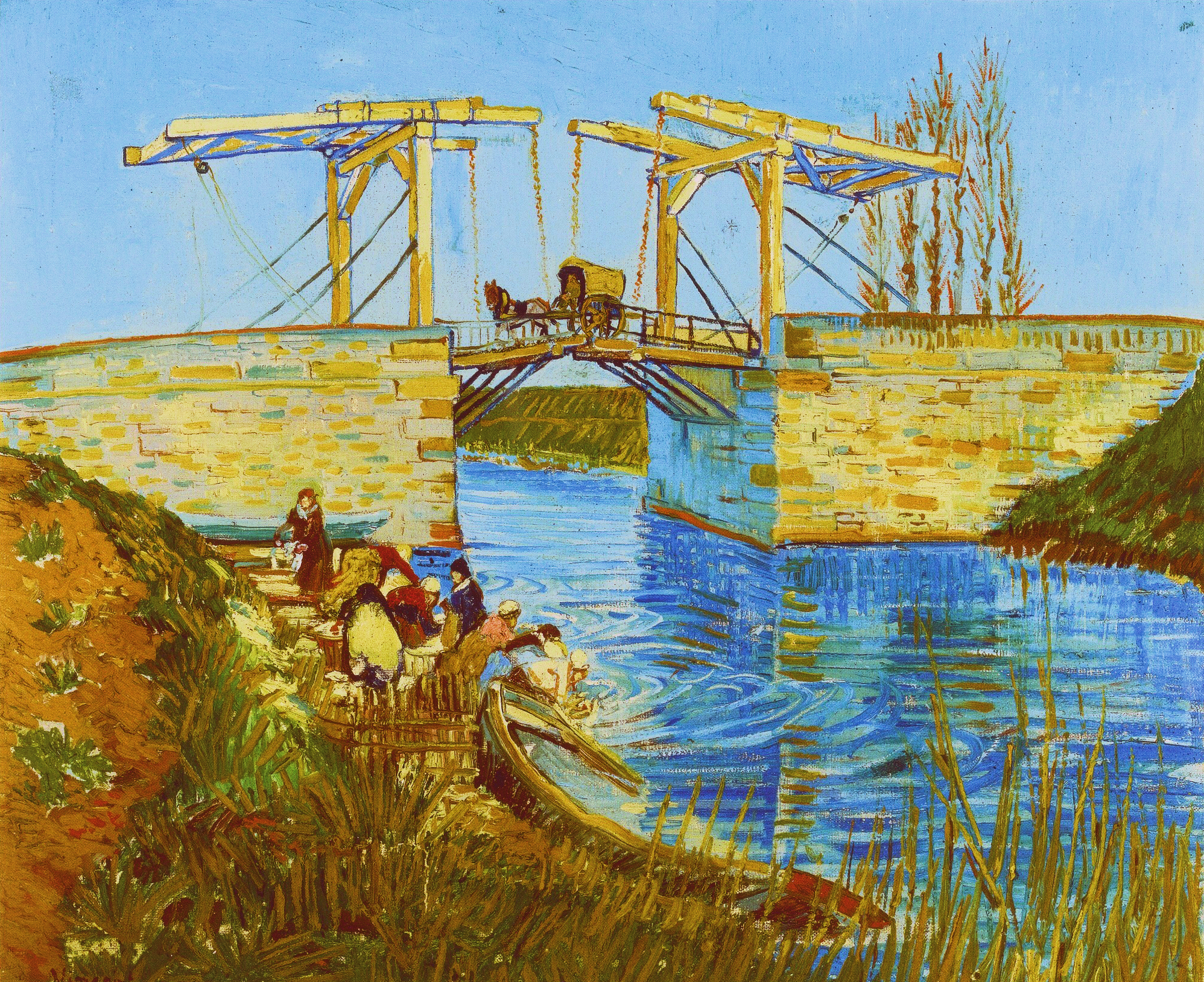
The Langlois Bridge at Arles with Women Washing, 1888, Kröller-Müller Museum, Otterlo, Netherlands (F397)

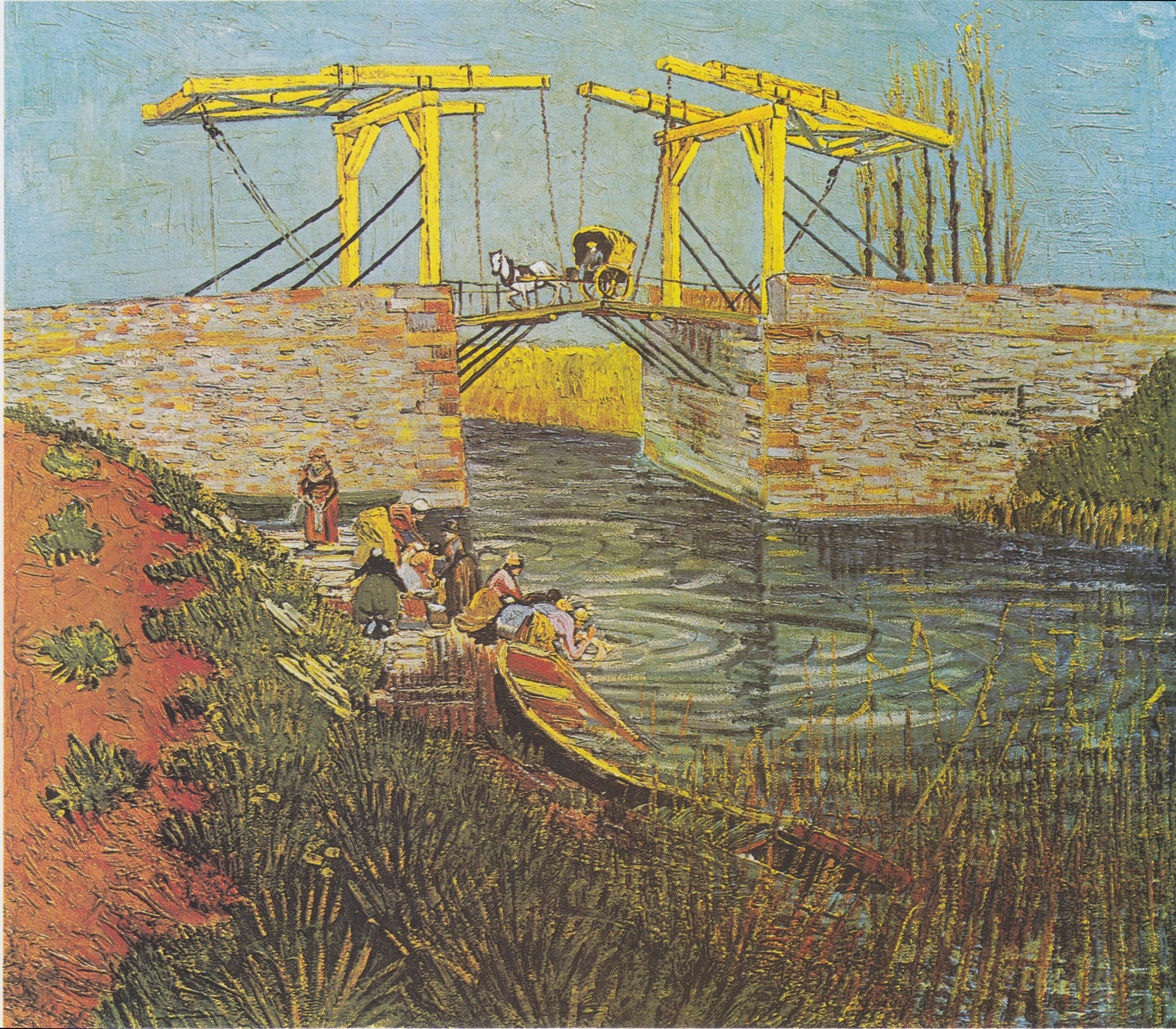
The Langlois Bridge at Arles, 1888, Private collection (F571)

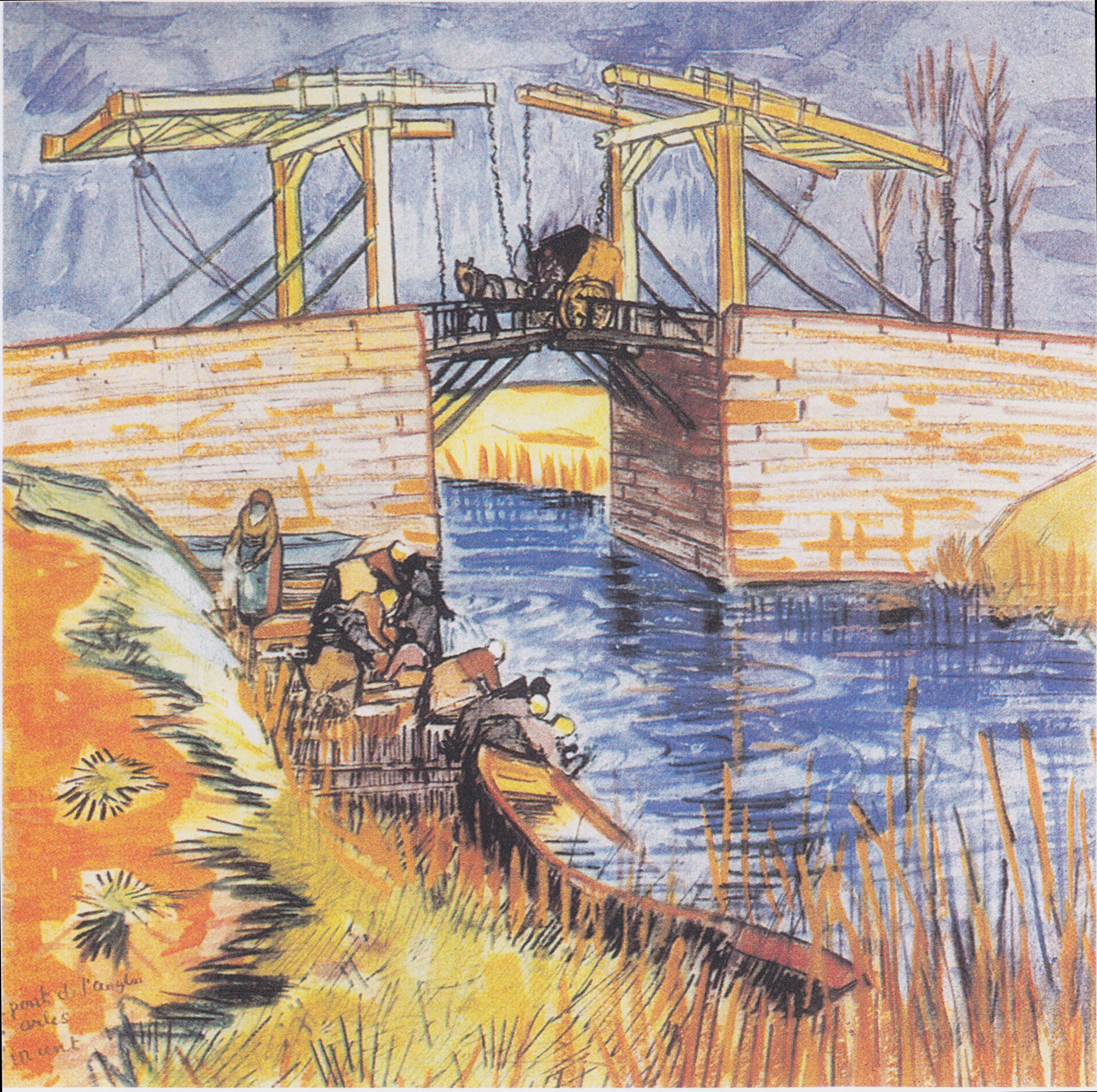
Langlois Bridge at Arles, watercolor, 1888, Private collection (F1480)

== Two other paintings ==
=== The Langlois Bridge at Arles with Road alongside the Canal ===
Van Gogh used varying techniques when he created the painting, depending upon the subject and what he wanted to convey. The grass and the path in the foreground were painted rapidly. The bridge, though, was painted in greater detail, with clearly defined stone piers and wooden beams. The detail in the ropes used to lift the roadway show that they are attached to the wooden lifting gear. Van Gogh also pays close attention to the reflection of the bridge in the water. In the distance is another drawbridge.

Van Gogh claimed the painting as "something funny... I will not create every day." There was something about the setting for this painting that reminded him of his homeland. He asked his brother Theo to frame an earlier version of the painting in blue and gold (blue in the front, gold on the side) and offer it to an art-dealer in the Netherlands, named Tersteeg. Tersteeg knew van Gogh and his brother Theo when they lived in The Hague. He nurtured van Gogh's early artistic interests but their relationship suffered after van Gogh lived with a prostitute named Sien.

The Van Gogh Museum claims that the painting is the last in a series of three, yet Silverman has identified four oil paintings and a fifth watercolor, as outlined in this article.

=== The Langlois Bridge at Arles ===
Wallraf-Richartz Museum's Langlois Bridge at Arles depicts a woman holding an umbrella as she crosses the Langlois Bridge, following a horse and buggy that just crossed the bridge. The water in the canal subtly reflects the bridge and the few clouds in the sky. Van Gogh uses impasto paint and color to reflect light, much as we would see it in with our eye. Two tall cypress trees and a white house flank the drawbridge which has a moveable center section between stone abutments. The painting is currently at the Wallraf-Richartz Museum in Cologne, Germany.

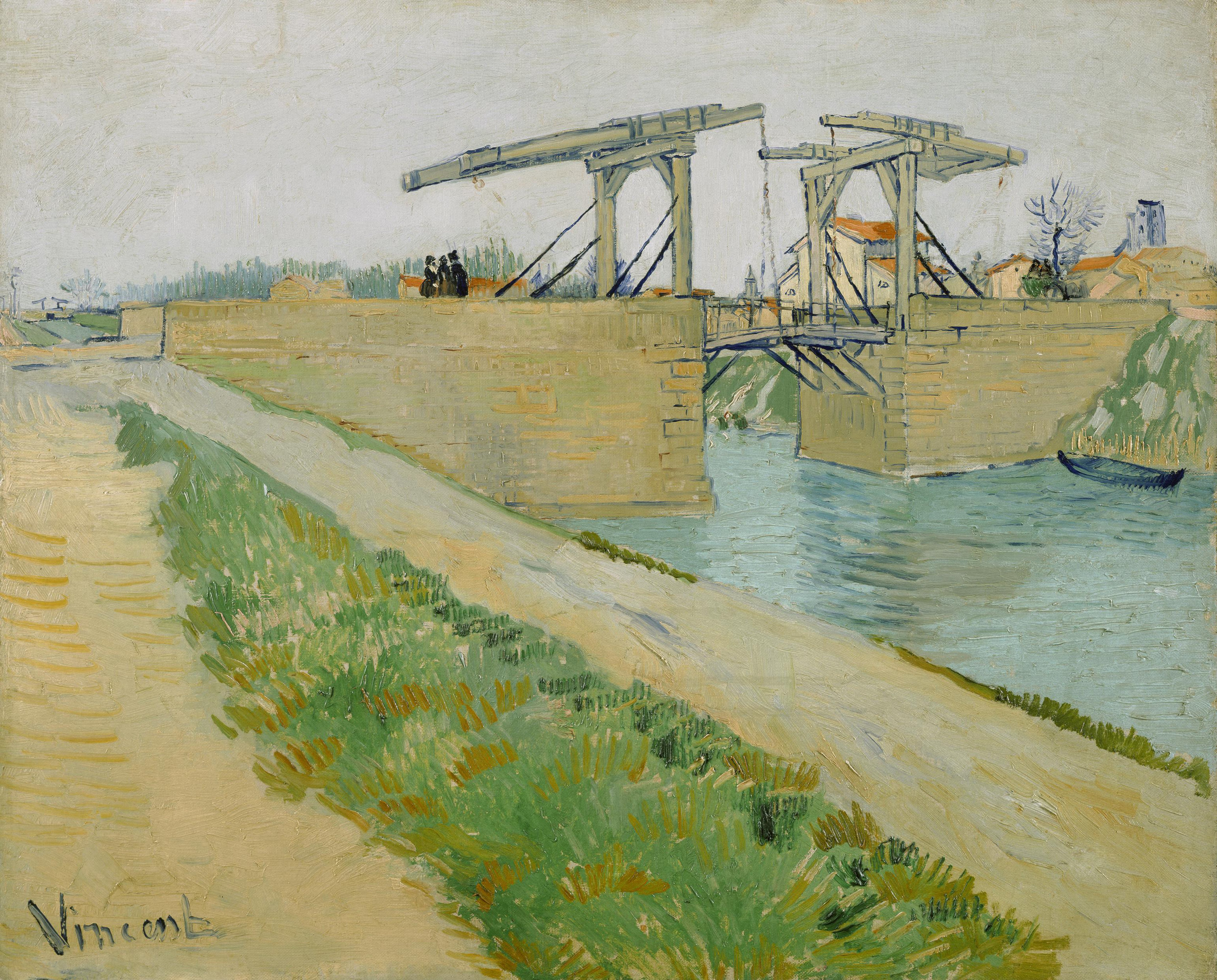
The Langlois Bridge at Arles with Road alongside the Canal, 1888, Van Gogh Museum, Amsterdam (F400)

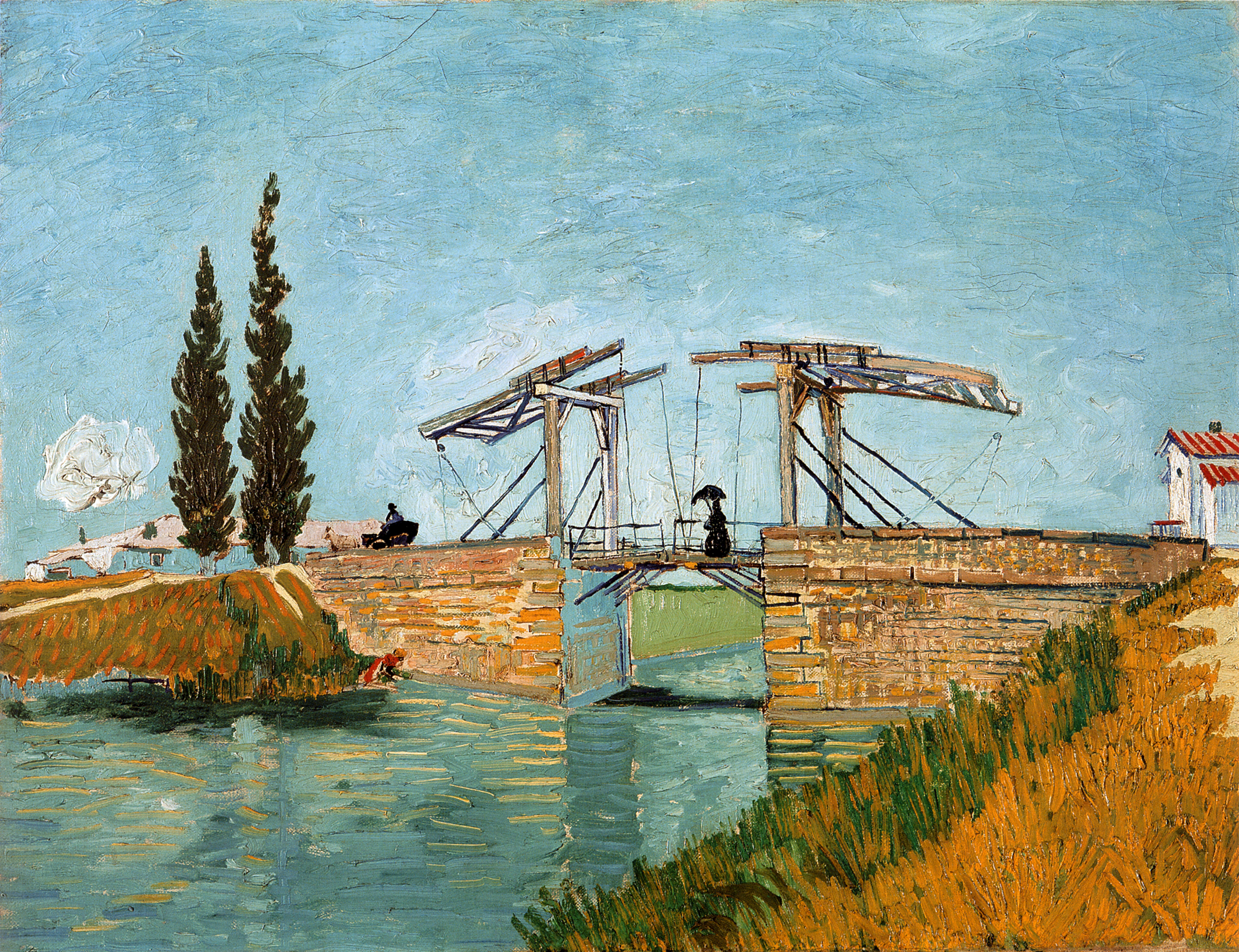
The Langlois Bridge at Arles, 1888, Wallraf-Richartz-Museum, Cologne (F570)

== Drawings ==
Soon after arriving in Arles, van Gogh asked his brother to send him a copy of Armand Cassagne's Guide to the Alphabet of Drawing. His request was generated by an interest to return to foundational drawing practices, such as his use of a perspective frame for the drawings and paintings that he made of Langlois Bridge. A letter dated March 18, 1888, to his friend Émile Bernard contains a sketch of the bridge (JH 1370 below) and the color scheme he is considering adopting, clearly showing his use of sketching and drawing as a preliminary to his painting. He spoke of how the town (Arles) "projects the strange silhouette of its drawbridge against a huge yellow sun."

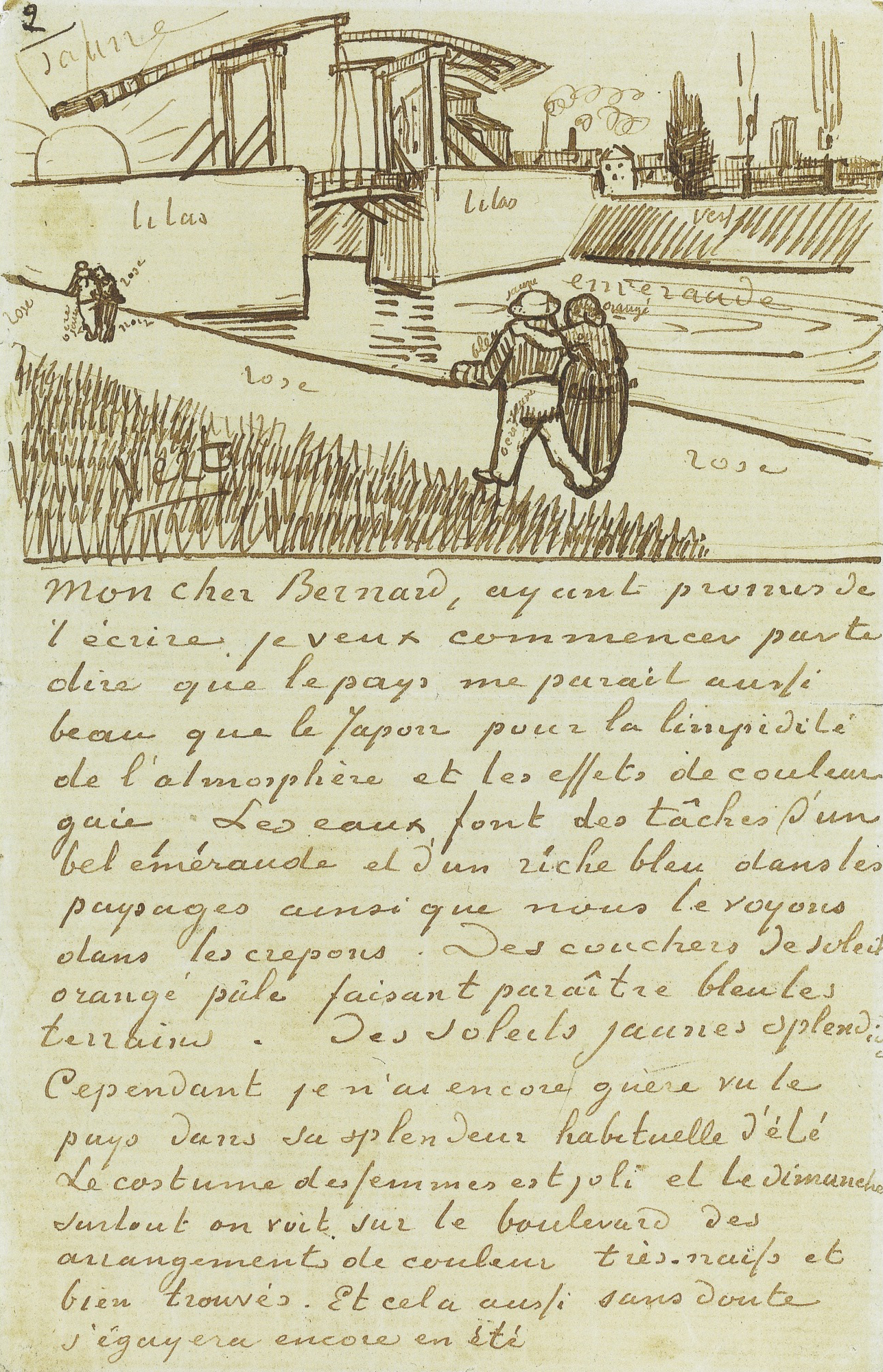
Langlois Bridge near Arles (Sketch from letter to Émile Bernard), March 1888, J. P. Morgan Library, New York City (JH 1370)

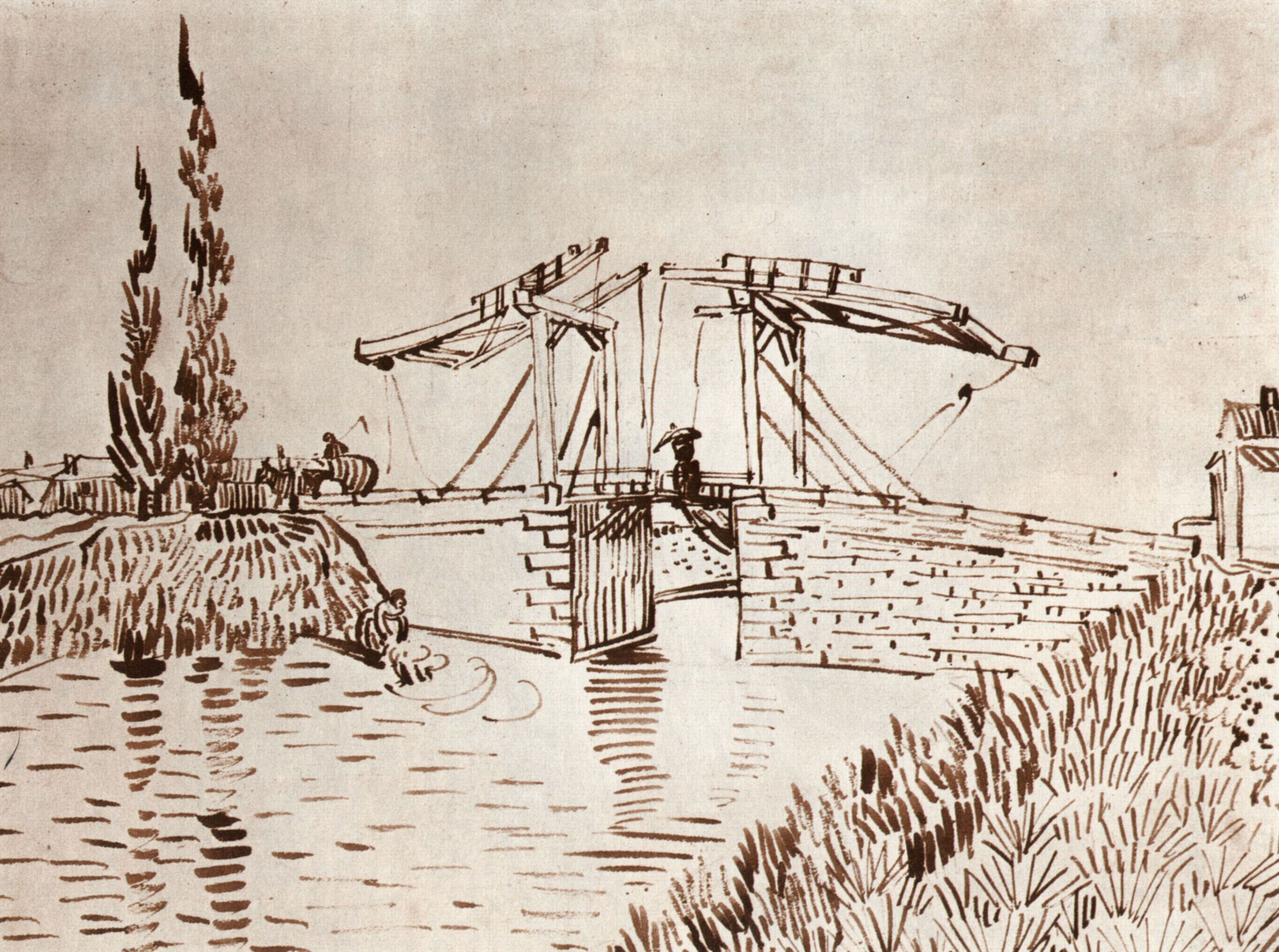
Drawbridge with Lady with Parasol, pen and ink, 23.5 × 31 cm., 1888, Los Angeles County Museum (F1471)

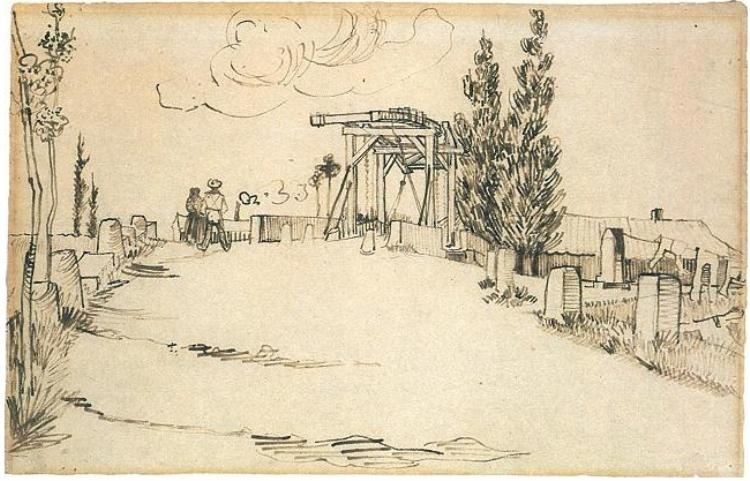
Langlois Bridge, Arles, pen and ink, 35.5 × 47 cm. May 1888, Staatsgalerie Stuttgart (F1470)

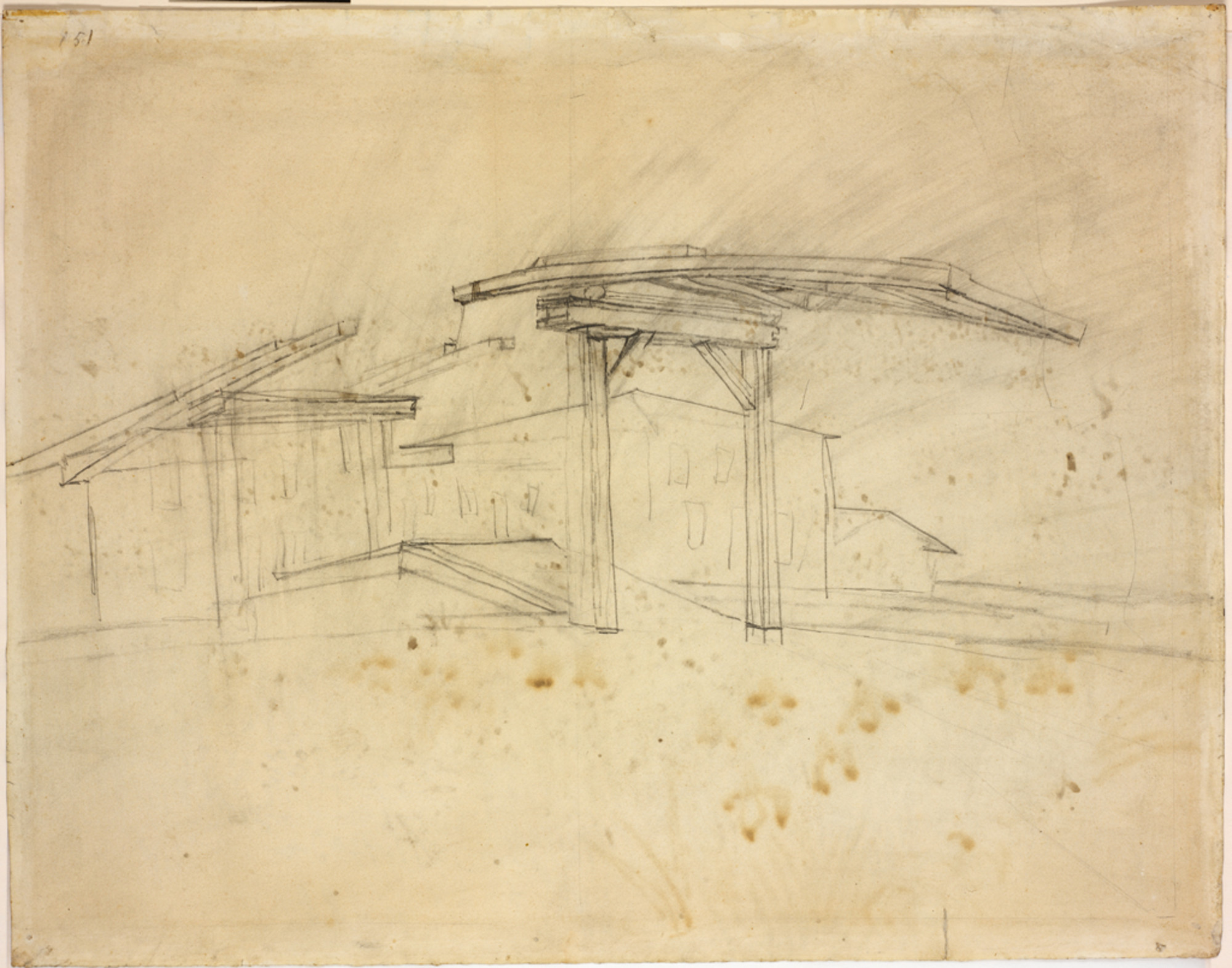
Drawbridge in Arles, crayon, 1888, Rhode Island School of Design Museum, Providence (F1416)

== Appearances in other media ==
Arthur C. Clarke made reference to van Gogh's Bridge at Arles in his novel 2001: A Space Odyssey. In it, the character David Bowman notices the painting (along with Andrew Wyeth's Christina's World) when observing the living room of "an elegant, anonymous hotel suite" after travelling through the Stargate. The painting did not appear in the movie.

Argentine musician Luis Alberto Spinetta referenced the painting in "Cantata de puentes amarillos" (Spanish for "Cantata of yellow bridges"), one of his most celebrated songs. Spinetta came to van Gogh's letters to Theo through his reading of the essay Van Gogh, The Man Suicided by Antonin Artaud. The track is the centerpiece of his 1973 record Artaud, named after the poet, which is generally considered the greatest album in Argentine rock history.

The painting is also featured on the 30th season of The Amazing Race, where as part of the detour challenge, teams will find this painting, which in reality is an elaborate sliding puzzle, requiring them to slide elements of the painting in a specific sequence in order to unlock the easel and retrieve their clue inside.

The Langlois Bridge at Arles with Women Washing is one of numerous van Gogh paintings visited by the unnamed dreamer in Akira Kurosawa’s film ‘’Dreams’’. Martin Scorsese appears as van Gogh himself, having recently crossed over the bridge to paint a field of wheat.

== See also ==
- List of works by Vincent van Gogh

== Bibliography ==
- Arfin, F (2005). Adventure Guide to Provence & the Cote D'azur. Edison, NJ: Hunter Publishing. ISBN 1-58843-505-9.
- Cowley, Robert L. S. (2014). "Van Gogh's Fascination with the Bridge at Arles," Blue Flag (Journal of the DBA - The Barge Association), 108 (October 2014), pp 18-22.
- Fell, D (2005) [2004]. Van Gogh's Women: Vincent's Love Affairs and Journey Into Madness. New York: Carroll & Graf Publishers. ISBN 0-7867-1655-X.
- Hulsker, Jan (1986), The complete Van Gogh, Outlet, p. 308, ISBN 0-8109-1701-7.
- Mancoff, D (2008). Van Gogh's Flowers. London: Frances Lincoln Limited. ISBN 978-0-7112-2908-2.
- Maurer, N (1999) [1998]. The Pursuit of Spiritual Wisdom: The Thought and Art of Vincent van Gogh and Paul Gauguin. Cranbury: Associated University Presses. ISBN 0-8386-3749-3.
- Morton, M; Schmunk, P (2000). The Arts Entwined: Music and Painting in the Nineteenth Century. New York: Garland Publishing. ISBN 0-8153-3156-8.
- Naifeh, Steven; Smith, Gregory White (2011). Van Gogh: The Life. Profile Books: ISBN 978-1-84668-010-6
- Perkowitz, S (1996). Empire of Light: A History of Discovery in Science and Art. Washington, D.C.: Joseph Henry Press. ISBN 0-309-06556-9.
- Shoham, S (2002). Art, crime, and madness: Gesualdo, Caravaggio, Genet, Van Gogh, Artaud. Brighton, England: Sussex Academic Press. ISBN 1-903900-05-0.
- Silverman, D (2000). Van Gogh and Gauguin: The Search for Sacred Art. New York: Farrar, Straus and Giroux. ISBN 0-374-28243-9.
