= Arles-Fos Canal =

Canal in Provence-Alpes-Côte d'Azur, France

Coordinates: 43.6706°N 4.6131°E

Canal d'Arles à Fos
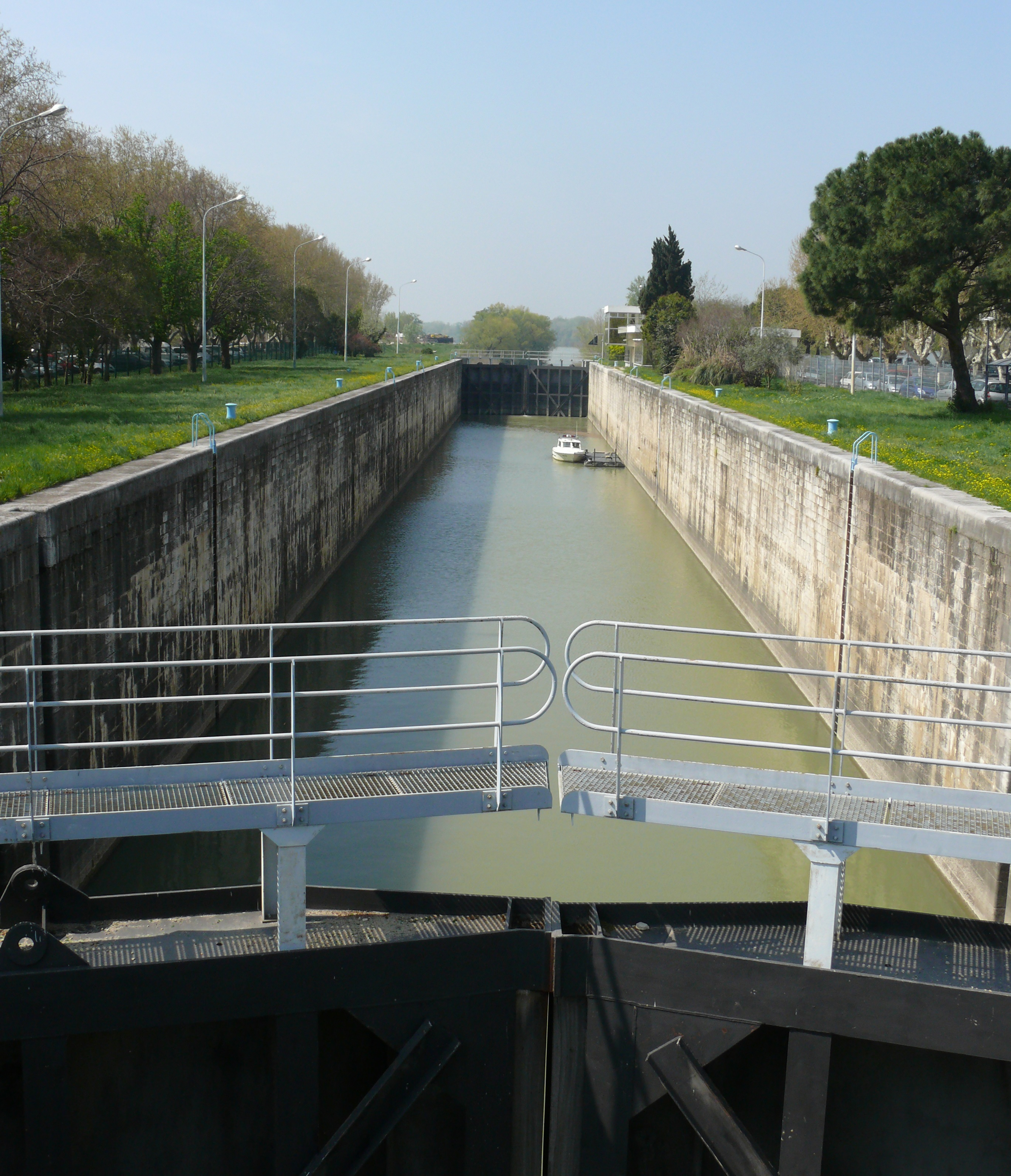
- Arles ecluse

Specifications
- Length: 31 km (19 mi)
- Minimum boat draft: 3 m
- Minimum boat air draft: 6.3 m
- Locks: 1

The Canal d'Arles à Fos (also: Canal d'Arles à Bouc) is a canal in southern France. It connects the Rhône near Arles with Fos-sur-Mer. It is 31 km (19 mi) long with one lock.

The Langlois Bridge painted by Vincent van Gogh in 1888 was one of the drawbridges across the canal.

== See also ==
- List of canals in France
- Canal de Craponne
