= Drawbridge =

Type of moveable bridge

Animation showing the operation of a drawbridge

A drawbridge or draw-bridge is a type of moveable bridge typically at the entrance to a castle or tower surrounded by a moat. In some forms of English, including American English, the word drawbridge commonly refers to all types of moveable bridges, such as bascule bridges, vertical-lift bridges and swing bridges, but this article concerns the narrower historical definition where the bridge is used in a defensive structure.

As used in castles or defensive structures, drawbridges provide access across defensive structures when lowered, but can quickly be raised from within to deny entry to an enemy force.

== Castle drawbridges ==
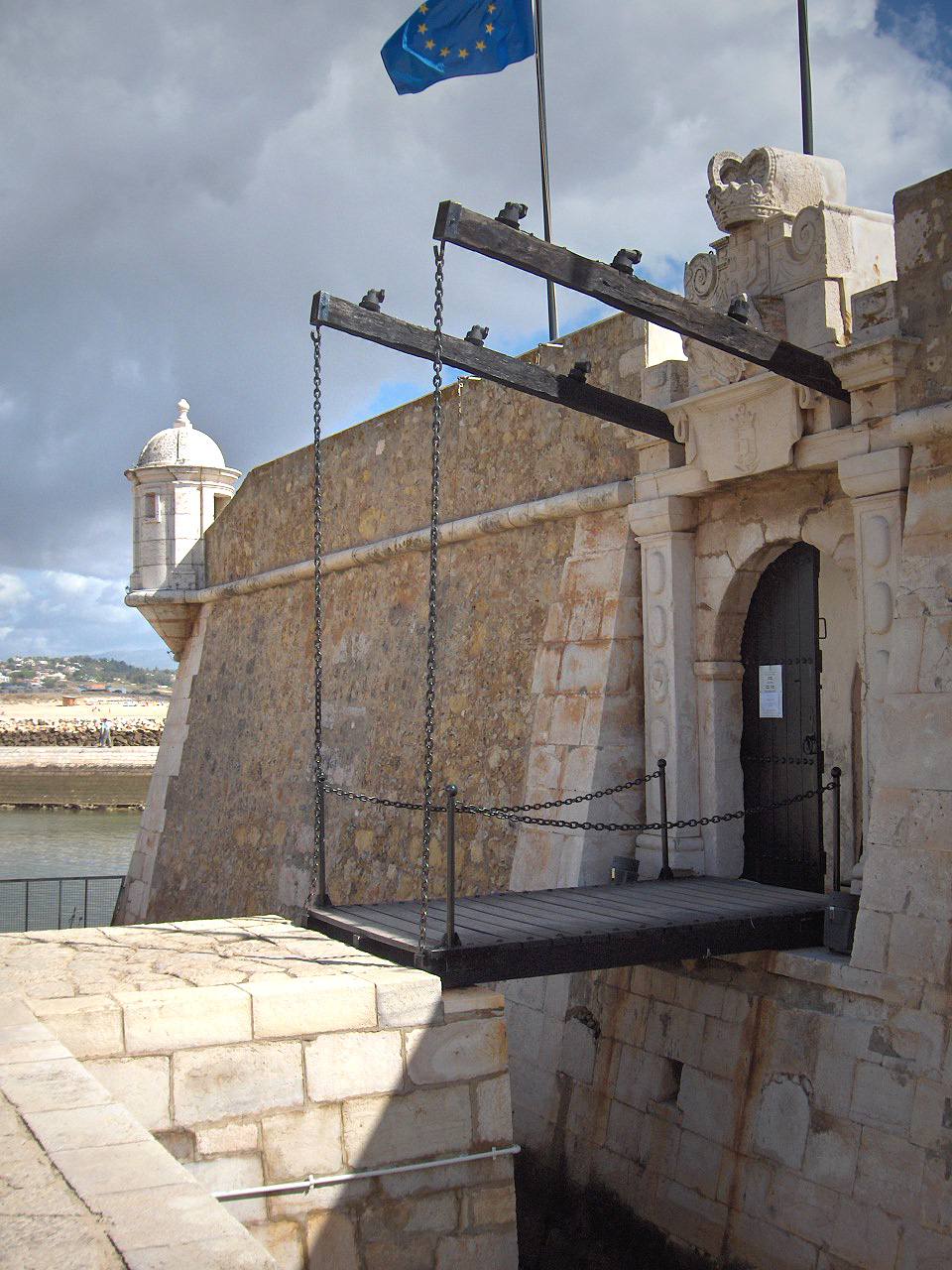
Drawbridge at the fort of Ponta da Bandeira in Lagos, Portugal

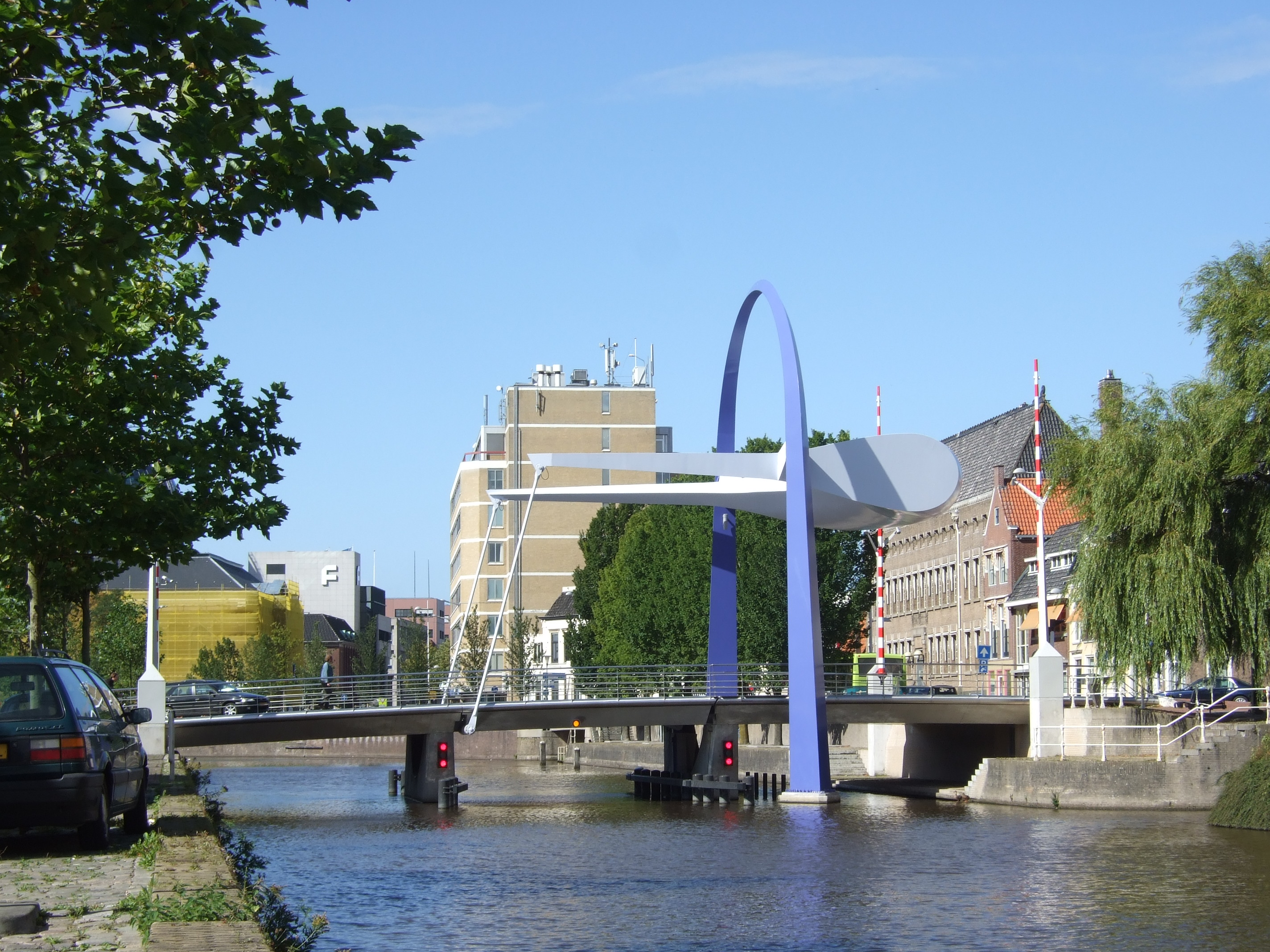
A double-beam drawbridge, the Poortbrug, in Leeuwarden, Netherlands

Medieval castles were usually defended by a ditch or moat, crossed by a wooden bridge. In early castles, the bridge might be designed to be destroyed or removed in the event of an attack, but drawbridges became very common. A typical arrangement would have the drawbridge immediately outside a gatehouse, consisting of a wooden deck with one edge hinged or pivoting at the gatehouse threshold, so that in the raised position the bridge would be flush against the gate, forming an additional barrier to entry. It would be backed by one or more portcullises and gates. Access to the bridge could be resisted with missiles from machicolations above or arrow slits in flanking towers.

The bridge would be raised or lowered using ropes or chains attached to a windlass in a chamber in the gatehouse above the gate-passage. Only a very light bridge could be raised in this way without any form of counterweight, so some form of bascule arrangement is normally found. The bridge may extend into the gate-passage beyond the pivot point, either over a pit into which the internal portion can swing (providing a further obstacle to attack), or in the form of counterweighted beams that drop into slots in the floor.

The raising chains could themselves be attached to counterweights. In some cases, a portcullis provides the weight, as at Alnwick. By the 14th century, a bascule arrangement was provided by lifting arms (called "gaffs") above and parallel to the bridge deck whose ends were linked by chains to the lifting part of the bridge. In the raised position, the gaffs would fit into slots in the gatehouse wall ("rainures") which can often still be seen in places like Herstmonceux Castle. Inside the castle, the gaffs were extended to bear counterweights, or might form the side-timbers of a stout gate which would be against the roof of the gate-passage when the drawbridge was down, but would close against the gate-arch as the bridge was raised.

In France, working drawbridges survive at a number of châteaux, including the Château du Plessis-Bourré. In England, two working drawbridges remain in regular use at Helmingham Hall, which dates from the early sixteenth century.

=== Turning bridge ===
A bridge pivoted on central trunnions is called a turning bridge, and may or may not have the raising chains characteristic of a drawbridge. The inner end carried counterweights enabling it to sink into a pit in the gate-passage, and when horizontal the bridge would often be supported by stout pegs inserted through the side walls. This was a clumsy arrangement, and many turning bridges were replaced with more advanced drawbridges.

== Forts ==
Drawbridges were also used on forts with Palmerston Forts using them in the form of Guthrie rolling bridges.

== In art ==
Drawbridges have appeared in films as part of castle sets. When the drawbridge needs to be functional this may present engineering challenges since the set may not be able to support the weight of the bridge in the conventional manner. One solution is to build the drawbridge from steel and concrete before hiding the structural materials behind wood and plaster.

== See also ==
- Bascule bridge
- Double-beam drawbridge
- Drawbridge mentality
- Portcullis
- Linkspan
- Moveable bridges
