= Bogomila Welsh-Ovcharov =

Canadian art historian, b. 1940

Bogomila Welch-Ovcharov
- Born: Bogomila Maria Ovcharov; 1940 (age 85–86); Sofia, Bulgaria
- Education: Ph.D. (cumlaude) University of Utrecht
- Known for: globally recognized art historian specializing in Vincent van Gogh who has also written on Émile Bernard and Paul Gauguin
- Spouse: Robert Welsh (1932-2000)
- Awards: Chevalier dans l'Ordre des Palmes Académique (1994)

Bogomila Welsh-Ovcharov (born 1940, Sofia) was an art historian and professor formerly at the University of Toronto Mississauga (she is now retired, and the university made her an emerita professor) who is an authority on the art of Vincent van Gogh. Her book Van Gogh: The Lost Arles Sketchbook, contains reproductions of sketches said to be by the artist, but the authenticity of which has been disputed.

She was the first non-French art scholar to be invited to curate the inaugural exhibition for the Musée D'Orsay in France. Welsh-Ovcharov was a contributor to an exhibition “The Mystical Landscape: From Claude Monet to Emily Carr,” organized by the Art Gallery of Ontario in Toronto in 2016, and the Musée D'Orsay in Paris in 2017.

== Selected publications ==
- The early work of Charles Angrand and his contact with Vincent van Gogh. Editions Victorine, Utrecht & Den Haag, 1971.
- Vincent Van Gogh: His Paris Period, 1886-1888. Editions Victorine, Utrecht, 1976.
- Vincent van Gogh and the Birth of Cloisonism. Art Gallery of Ontario, Toronto, 1981. ISBN 0919876668
- Van Gogh in Provence and Auvers. Hugh Lauter Levin Associates, 1999. ISBN 0883636980
- Gauguin's Nirvana : painters at Le Pouldu 1889-90. New Haven : Wadsworth Atheneum Museum of Art, Hartford in association with Yale University Press, 2001.ISBN 0300089546 (invited contributor)
- Vincent van Gogh: The Lost Arles Sketchbook. Abrams Books, 2016. ISBN 978-1419725944

== Awards ==
- (1994): awarded the “Chevalier dans l'Ordre des Palmes Académique“ for her scholarly contributions to French art history;

== Personal ==
She was married to Robert Welsh (1932–2000), Mondrian scholar.
