= Ronald Pickvance =

English art historian

Ronald Pickvance

Ronald Pickvance (August 15, 1930, in Bolton – March 21, 2017, in Cheltenham) was a British art historian. His specialty was French art of the late 19th century. Pickvance studied art history at the University of Cambridge until 1953 and then moved to the Courtauld Institute of Art in London for two years. From 1957 to 1965 he lectured for the Arts Council of Great Britain and acted as curator for the art collections of the University of London. From 1966 he taught art history at the University of Nottingham and in 1976 moved to the University of Glasgow, where he held the Richmond Chair of Fine Arts as professor from 1977 to 1984. Pickvance curated several exhibitions on Impressionist and Post-Impressionist artists and published books on these subjects.

Pickvance wrote the foreword to Van Gogh: The Lost Arles Sketchbook (edited by Bogomila Welsh-Ovcharov) which contained reproductions of sketches said to be by the artist, but the authenticity of which has been disputed. Pickvance was suffering from cataracts at the time.

== Selected publications ==
- The drawings of Gauguin. Paul Hamlyn, London, 1970. ISBN 0600025551
- English Influences on Vincent van Gogh. University of Nottingham and the Arts Council of Great Britain, London 1974.
- Degas 1879. National Gallery of Scotland Edinburgh, 1979
- Van Gogh in Arles. Metropolitan Museum of Art, New York, 1984. ISBN 0-87099-376-3.
- Van Gogh in Saint Remy and Auvers Metropolitan Museum of Art, New York, 1986. ISBN 0-87099-475-1.
- Gauguin and the School of Pont-Aven. Art Gallery of New South Wales, Sydney, 1994. ISBN 9780731029211
- Degas sculptor. Waanders, Zwolle, 1991. ISBN 90-6630-330-1.
- Degas. Exhibition catalog, Fondation Pierre Gianadda, Martigny 1993. ISBN 2-88443-027-X.
- Manet. Exhibition catalog, Fondation Pierre Gianadda, Martigny 1996. ISBN 2-88443-037-7.
- Paul Gauguin. Exhibition catalog, Fondation Pierre Gianadda, Martigny, 1998. ISBN 2-88443-048-2.
- Van Gogh. Exhibition catalog, Fondation Pierre Gianadda, Martigny 2000, ISBN 2-88443-060-1.
