= 15th Street–Prospect Park station =

New York City Subway station in Brooklyn

15 Street–Prospect Park
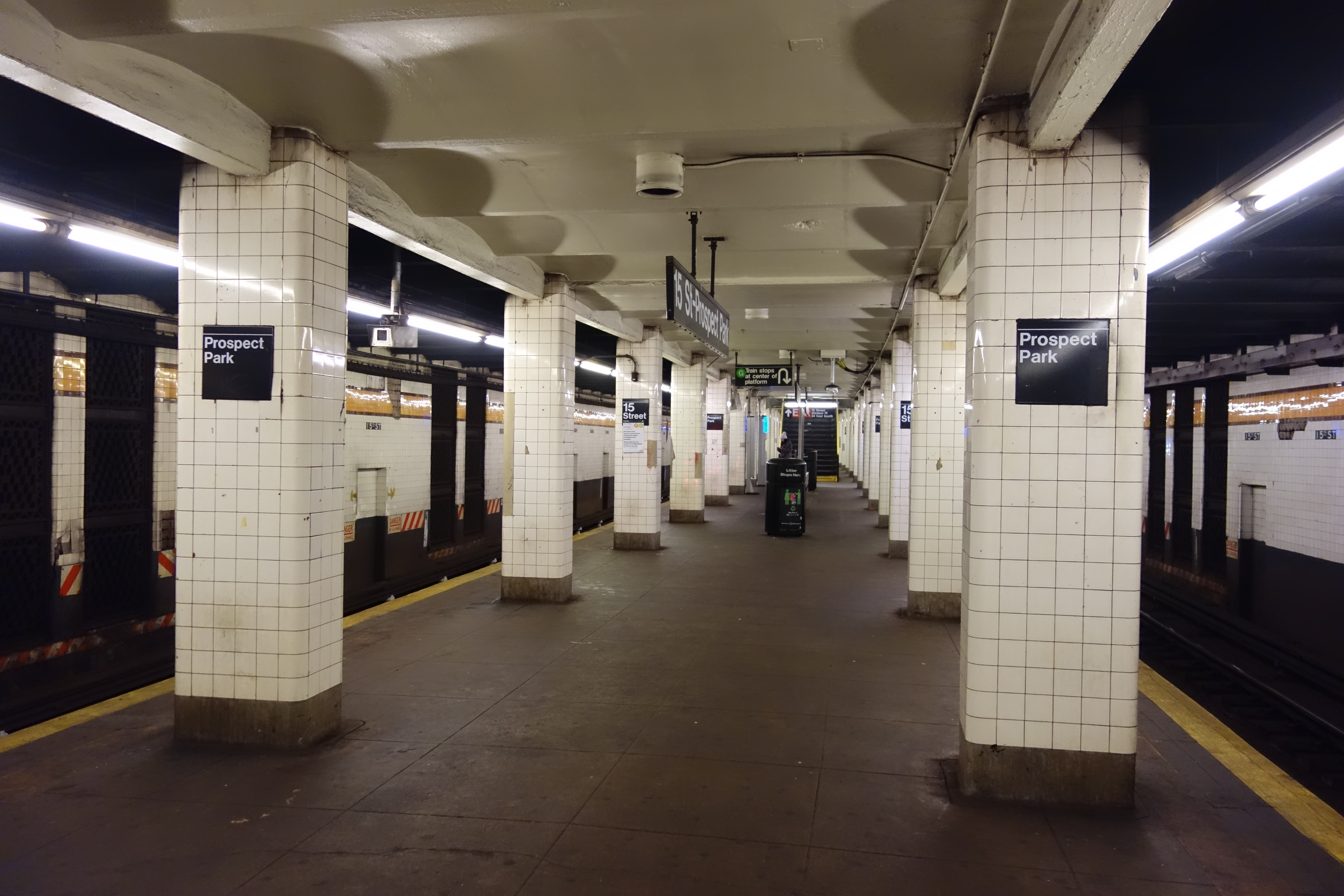

Station statistics
- Address: 15th Street near Prospect Park West; Brooklyn, New York
- Borough: Brooklyn
- Locale: Windsor Terrace, Park Slope
- Coordinates: 40°39′38″N 73°58′45″W
- Division: B (IND)
- Line: IND Culver Line
- Services: F (all times); G (all times)
- Transit: NYCT Bus: B61, B68
- Structure: Underground
- Platforms: 1 island platform
- Tracks: 2

Other information
- Opened: October 7, 1933; 93 years ago

Traffic
- 2025: 1,460,232 ▲5.5%
- Rank: 233 out of 423
Services
Preceding station	New York City Subway	Following station
Seventh Avenue via Bergen Street	Local	Fort Hamilton Parkway via Church Avenue
does not stop here
Location
Location within New York City Subway
Location within New York City
Location within New York
Track layout
Street map
Station service legend
Symbol	Description
Stops all times	Stops all times
- 15th Street–Prospect Park Subway Station (IND)
- U.S. National Register of Historic Places
- New York State Register of Historic Places
- MPS: New York City Subway System MPS
- NRHP reference No.: 05000748
- NYSRHP No.: 04701.013863

Significant dates
- Added to NRHP: July 27, 2005
- Designated NYSRHP: May 11, 2005

The 15th Street–Prospect Park station is a local station on the IND Culver Line of the New York City Subway. Located at 15th Street east of Prospect Park West in the Windsor Terrace and Park Slope neighborhoods in Brooklyn, it is served by the F and G trains at all times. The <F> train skips this station when it operates.

This underground station, opened on October 7, 1933, has two tracks and one island platform. The Culver Line's express tracks run via a separate routing underneath Prospect Park and are not visible from the platforms. Due to the alignment of the street grid, the station and tunnel were constructed about 100 feet (30 m) east of Prospect Park West, rather than directly under any street. This station was added to the U.S. National Register of Historic Places in 2005.

== History ==
One of the goals of Mayor John Hylan's Independent Subway System (IND), proposed in the 1920s, was a line to Coney Island, reached by a recapture of the BMT Culver Line. As originally designed, service to and from Manhattan would have been exclusively provided by Culver express trains, while all local service would have fed into the IND Crosstown Line. The line was extended from Bergen Street to Church Avenue on October 7, 1933, including the 15th Street–Prospect Park station.

Upon the station's completion, it served Windsor Terrace, a mostly residential area with brownstones and row houses occupied by European immigrants. It was also directly adjacent to Prospect Park and close to Green-Wood Cemetery. This station was added to the National Register of Historic Places on July 27, 2005.

=== Service patterns ===
The station was originally served by the A train. In 1936, the A was rerouted to the IND Fulton Street Line and was replaced by E trains from the Queens Boulevard Line. In 1937, the connection to the IND Crosstown Line opened and GG (later renamed the G) trains were extended to Church Avenue, complementing the E. In December 1940, after the IND Sixth Avenue Line opened, E trains were replaced by the F, and the GG was cut back to Smith–Ninth Streets. Following the completion of the Culver Ramp in 1954, D Concourse Express trains replaced F service to Coney Island. In November 1967, the Chrystie Street Connection opened and D trains were rerouted via the Manhattan Bridge and the BMT Brighton Line to Coney Island. F trains were extended once again via the Culver Line.

The station acted as a local-only station from 1968 to 1976, when F trains ran express in both directions between Bergen Street and Church Avenue during rush hours. G trains were extended from Smith–Ninth Streets to Church Avenue to provide local service. Express service between Bergen and Church ended in 1976 due to budgetary concerns and passenger complaints, and the GG, later renamed the G, was again terminated at the Smith–Ninth Streets station.

In July 2009, the G was again extended from its terminus at Smith–Ninth Streets to a more efficient terminus at Church Avenue to accommodate the rehabilitation of the Culver Viaduct. The G extension was made permanent in July 2012. In July 2019, the MTA revealed plans to restore express service on the Culver Line between Jay Street and Church Avenue. Express service started on September 16, 2019.

== Station layout ==
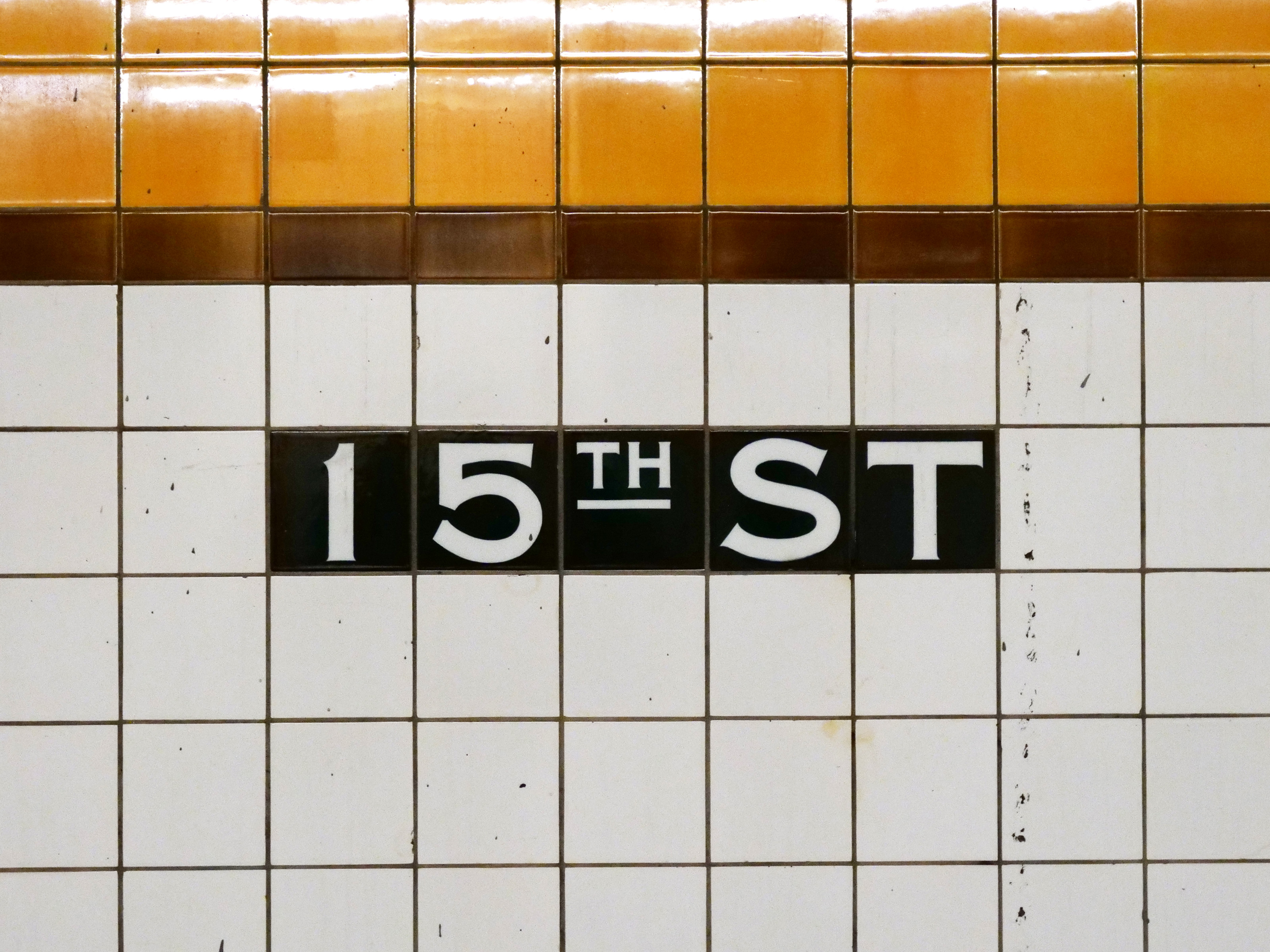
Tile caption below trim line

This underground station has two tracks and an island platform. The two express tracks of the line run along a separate, more direct alignment under Prospect Park, and are not visible from this station. The station is approximately 662 feet (202 m) long and 50 feet (15 m) wide, excluding exits and passageways. The station and tunnel were constructed about 100 feet (30 m) east of Prospect Park West. Therefore, the station is not located underneath a street. Some portions of the tunnel are directly underneath Prospect Park, while others are between Prospect Park West and 10th Avenue.

Both trackside walls have an orange-yellow trim line with a medium red-brown border with small black and white "15TH ST" tile captions below it at regular intervals. The tile band is set in a three-high course, a pattern usually reserved for express stations. The tiles were part of a color-coded tile system used throughout the IND. The tile colors were designed to facilitate navigation for travelers going away from Lower Manhattan. As such, the yellow tiles used at 15th Street were also used at Seventh Avenue, the next express station to the north, while a different tile color is used at Church Avenue, the next express station to the south. Yellow tiles are also used at Fort Hamilton Parkway, the only other local station between Seventh Avenue and Church Avenue.

Ventilation grates are located along the trackside walls. A row of large, white tiled columns runs along either side of the platform and the mezzanine above at 15-foot (4.6 m) intervals. Alternating columns carry the standard black-and-white station name plate. The ceiling of the platform level is held up by H-shaped piers located every 15 feet (4.6 m), which support girders underneath the mezzanine. The roof girders are also connected to columns in the trackside walls.

The tunnel is covered by a U-shaped trough that contains utility pipes and wires. The outer walls of this trough are composed of columns, spaced approximately every 5 feet (1.5 m) with concrete infill between them. There is a 1-inch (25 mm) gap between the tunnel wall and the trackside wall, which is made of 4-inch (100 mm)-thick brick covered over by a tiled finish.

The narrow mezzanine is full-length, sparsely decorated with plain tiling typical of the IND, and allows out-of-system walking from one end to the other. Six staircases lead from the platform to the mezzanine. The area inside the fare control area is split into two sections, one considerably smaller than the other.

=== Exits ===
There are six entrances to the station in total. The northern end has four exit stairs. Two of them are reached only by a long passageway extending west; one stair goes to the northwest corner of Bartel-Pritchard Square while another goes to the east side of Prospect Park West between 15th Street and Bartel-Pritchard Square. The other two staircases go to the northern and southern sides of Prospect Park Southwest, east of Bartel-Pritchard Square. The eastern staircase on Prospect Park West, as well as the northern staircase on Prospect Park South, are located within the boundaries of Prospect Park and contain stone banisters. The other staircases contain metal banisters, typical of other New York City Subway stations. Communications rooms are also located near the Prospect Park West staircase.

The center of the mezzanine has one staircase going up to the north side of 16th Street while the south end has one staircase going up to the north side of Windsor Place near the intersection of Howard Place. Both stairs contain typical metal banisters. Full-height turnstiles provide access to and from the fare control areas near these entrances. The station's only token booth and bank of regular turnstiles is located between the south and center fare control areas, and there are additional communications rooms on the southern end of the mezzanine. Evidence of at least two former booths exist.

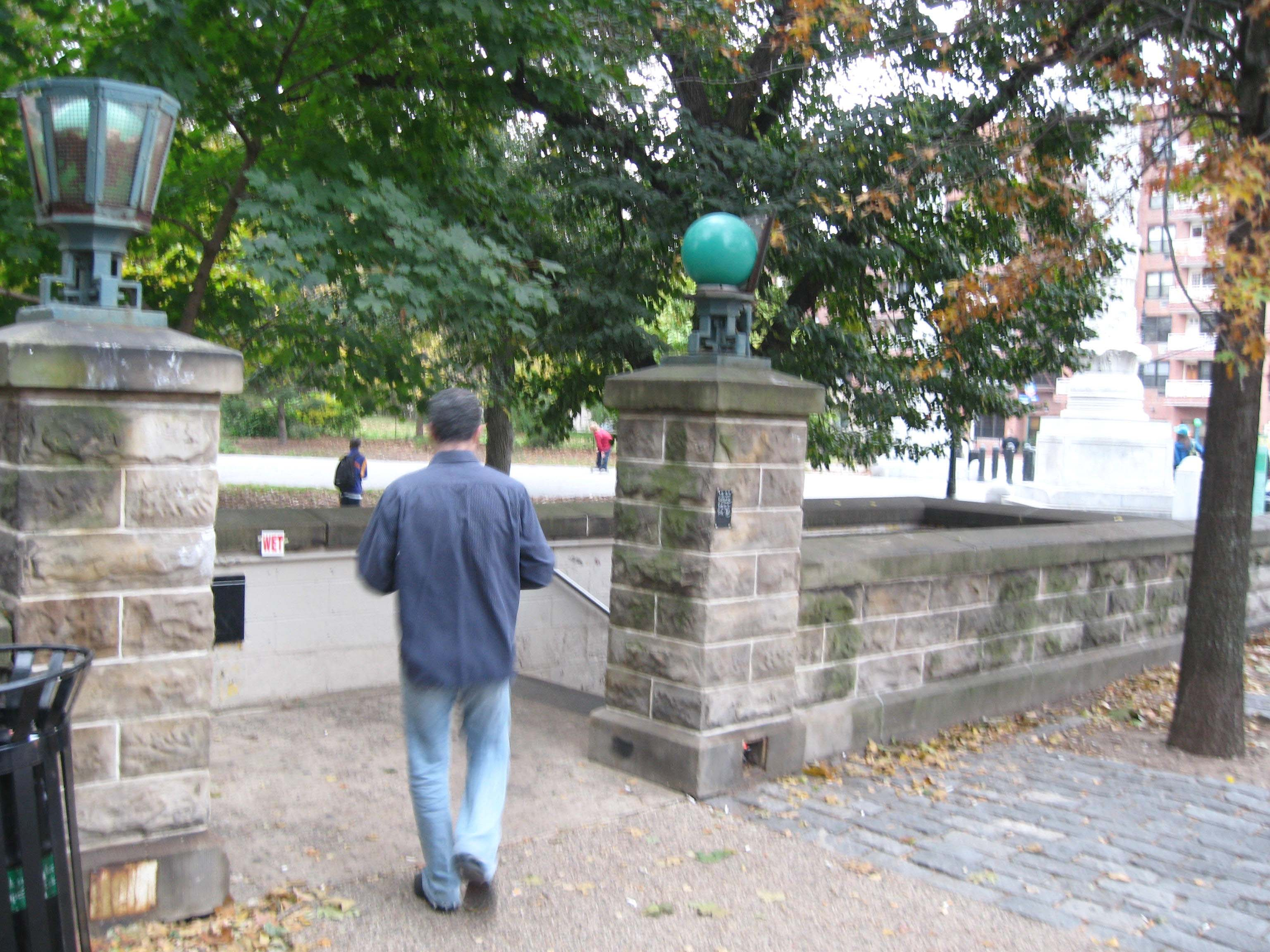
Northeastern stair

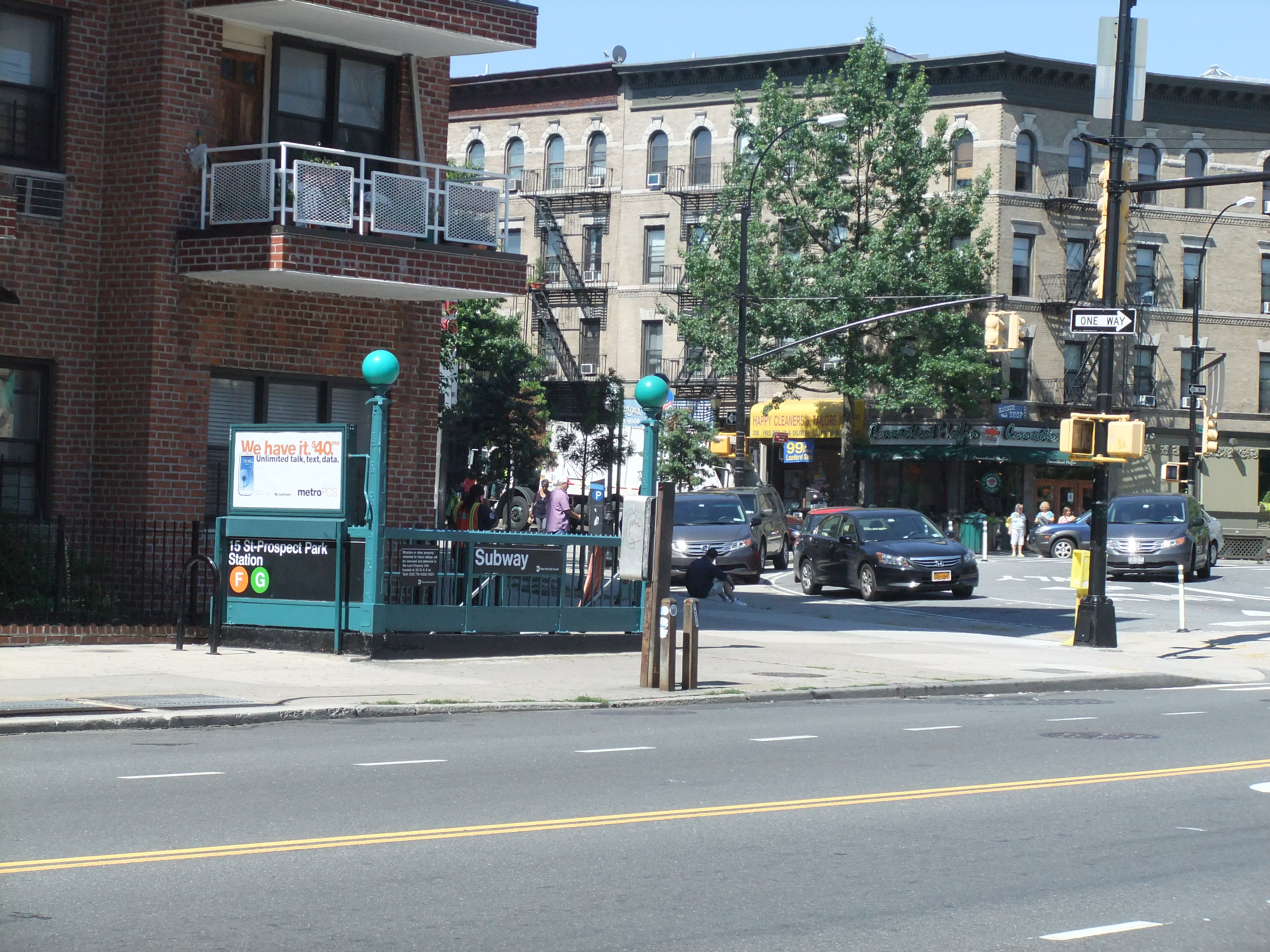
Eastern stair

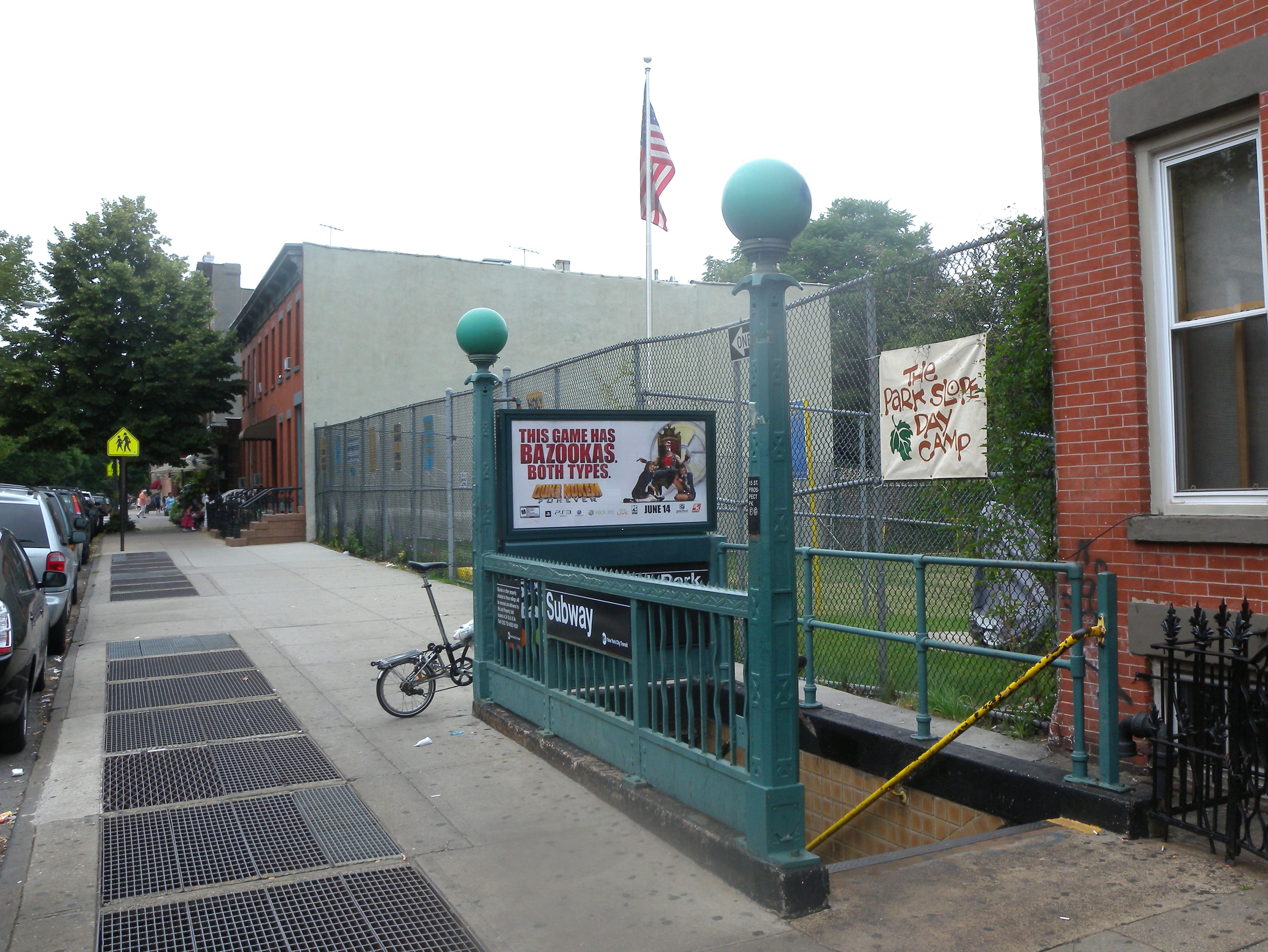
Southern stair, Windsor Place

== In popular culture ==
Several dream sequences in the film Pi, which take place in an empty generic-looking New York City Subway station, were shot at 15th Street–Prospect Park.

== See also ==
- National Register of Historic Places listings in Brooklyn
