= Carroll Street station =

New York City Subway station in Brooklyn

Carroll Street
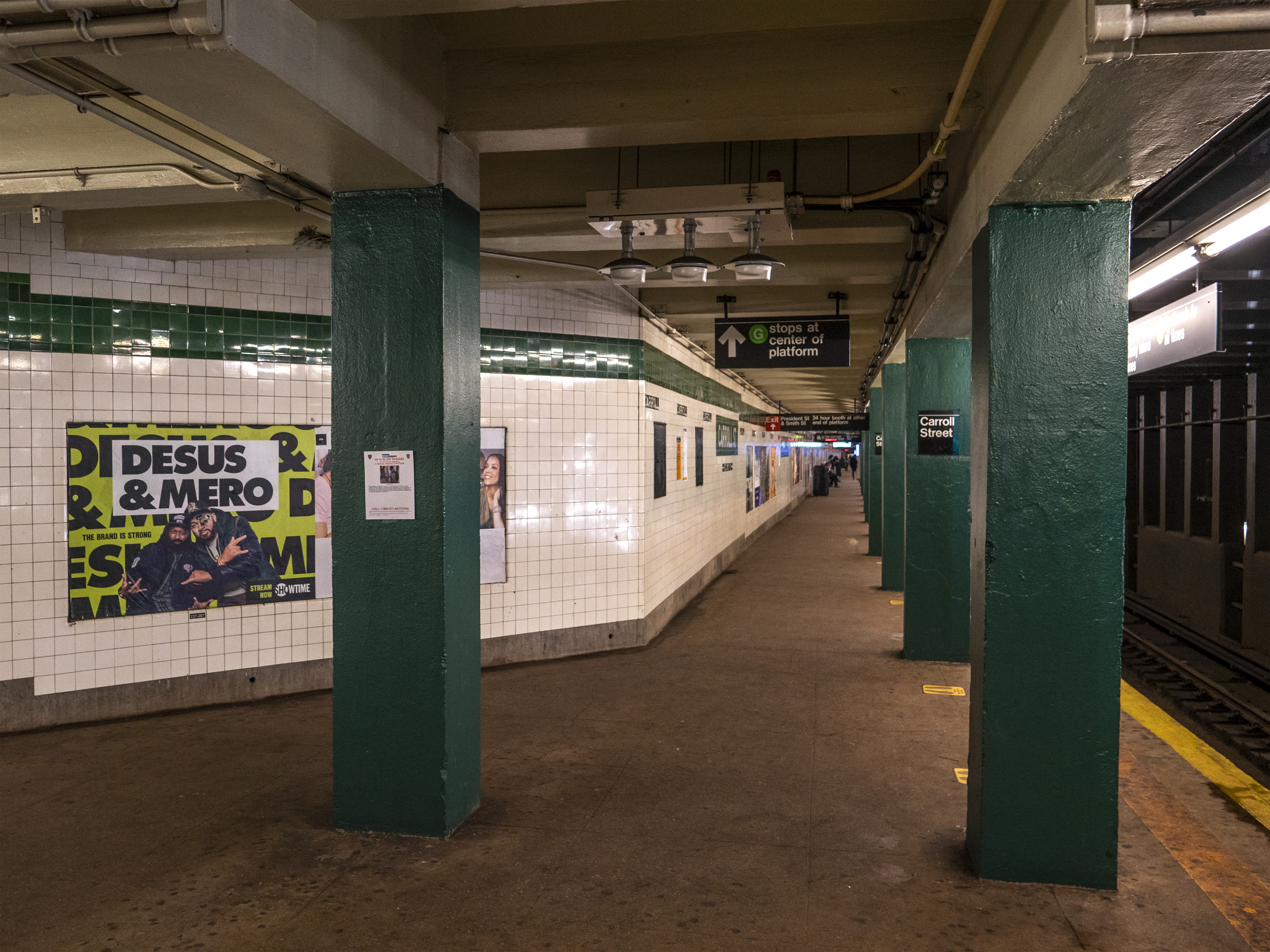
- Southbound platform

Station statistics
- Address: Carroll Street and Smith Street; Brooklyn, New York
- Borough: Brooklyn
- Locale: Carroll Gardens
- Coordinates: 40.6802°N 73.9948°W
- Division: B (IND)
- Line: IND Culver Line
- Services: F (all times); G (all times)
- Transit: NYCT Bus: B57
- Structure: Underground
- Platforms: 2 side platforms
- Tracks: 4

Other information
- Opened: October 7, 1933; 93 years ago

Traffic
- 2025: 3,006,349 ▲11.2%
- Rank: 125 out of 423
Services
Preceding station	New York City Subway	Following station
Bergen Street services split	Local	Smith–Ninth Streets via Church Avenue
does not stop here
Location
Location within New York City Subway
Location within New York City
Location within New York
Track layout
Street map
Station service legend
Symbol	Description
Stops all times	Stops all times

The Carroll Street station is a local station on the IND Culver Line of the New York City Subway, located in the neighborhood of Carroll Gardens, Brooklyn, at Carroll and Smith Streets. It is served by the F and G trains at all times. The <F> train skips this station when it operates.

== History ==
One of the goals of Mayor John Hylan's Independent Subway System (IND), proposed in the 1920s, was a line to Coney Island, reached by a recapture of the BMT Culver Line. As originally designed, service to and from Manhattan would have been exclusively provided by Culver express trains, while all local service would have fed into the IND Crosstown Line. The line was extended from Bergen Street to Church Avenue on October 7, 1933, including the Carroll Street station.

=== Service patterns ===
The station was originally served by the A train. In 1936, the A was rerouted to the IND Fulton Street Line and was replaced by E trains from the Queens Boulevard Line. In 1937, the connection to the IND Crosstown Line opened and GG (later renamed the G) trains were extended to Church Avenue, complementing the E. In December 1940, after the IND Sixth Avenue Line opened, E trains were replaced by the F, and the GG was cut back to Smith–Ninth Streets. Following the completion of the Culver Ramp in 1954, D Concourse Express trains replaced F service to Coney Island. In November 1967, the Chrystie Street Connection opened and D trains were rerouted via the Manhattan Bridge and the BMT Brighton Line to Coney Island. F trains were extended once again via the Culver Line.

The station acted as a local-only station from 1968 to 1976, when F trains ran express in both directions between Bergen Street and Church Avenue during rush hours. Express service between Bergen and Church ended in 1976 due to budgetary concerns and passenger complaints. In July 2019, the MTA revealed plans to restore express service on the Culver Line between Jay Street and Church Avenue. Express service started on September 16, 2019.

== Station layout ==
The station, located underground, has four tracks and two side platforms. The two center express tracks are at a lower level than the local tracks at the north end, and ramp up to the same level by the southern end. Beyond the station, the four track line ascends onto the only original IND elevated structure, rising above the Gowanus Canal and toward Smith–Ninth Streets, the next station south.

Both platforms have a green trim line with a hunter green border and name tablets reading "CARROLL ST." in white sans-serif lettering on a hunter green background and green border. Small directional and station signs in white lettering on a black background are below the trim line and name tablets. Large square columns painted hunter green run at regular intervals on both platforms, with alternating ones having the standard black station name plate with white lettering. The tiles were part of a color-coded tile system used throughout the IND. The tile colors were designed to facilitate navigation for travelers going away from Lower Manhattan. As such, the green tiles used at the Carroll Street station were originally also used at Bergen Street, the next express station to the north, while a different tile color is used at Seventh Avenue, the next express station to the south.

=== Exits ===
Exit location	Exit type	Number of exits	Platform served
NW corner of President Street and Smith Street	Staircase	1	Southbound
NE corner of President Street and Smith Street	Staircase	1	Northbound
SE corner of President Street and Smith Street	Staircase	1	Northbound
SE corner of Second Street and Smith Street	Staircase	1	Both
NW corner of Second Place and Smith Street	Staircase	1	Both

Despite the station name, there are no entrances/exits from Carroll Street. The full-time fare control is at the extreme south end of the station. A single staircase from each platform goes up to a crossover, where a turnstile bank provides entrance/exit to the system and mosaic signs point to the platforms. The mezzanine has a token booth and one staircase to the southeast corner of Second Street and Smith Street while another staircase built inside a building leads to the northwest corner of Second Place and Smith Street.

Both platforms have an un-staffed fare control area at their north ends. Each one has two exit-only turnstiles and one high entry/exit turnstile, all on platform level. The one on the northbound platform has two staircases going up to either eastern corners of Smith and President Streets while the one on the Coney Island-bound platform has one staircase going up to the northwest corner.

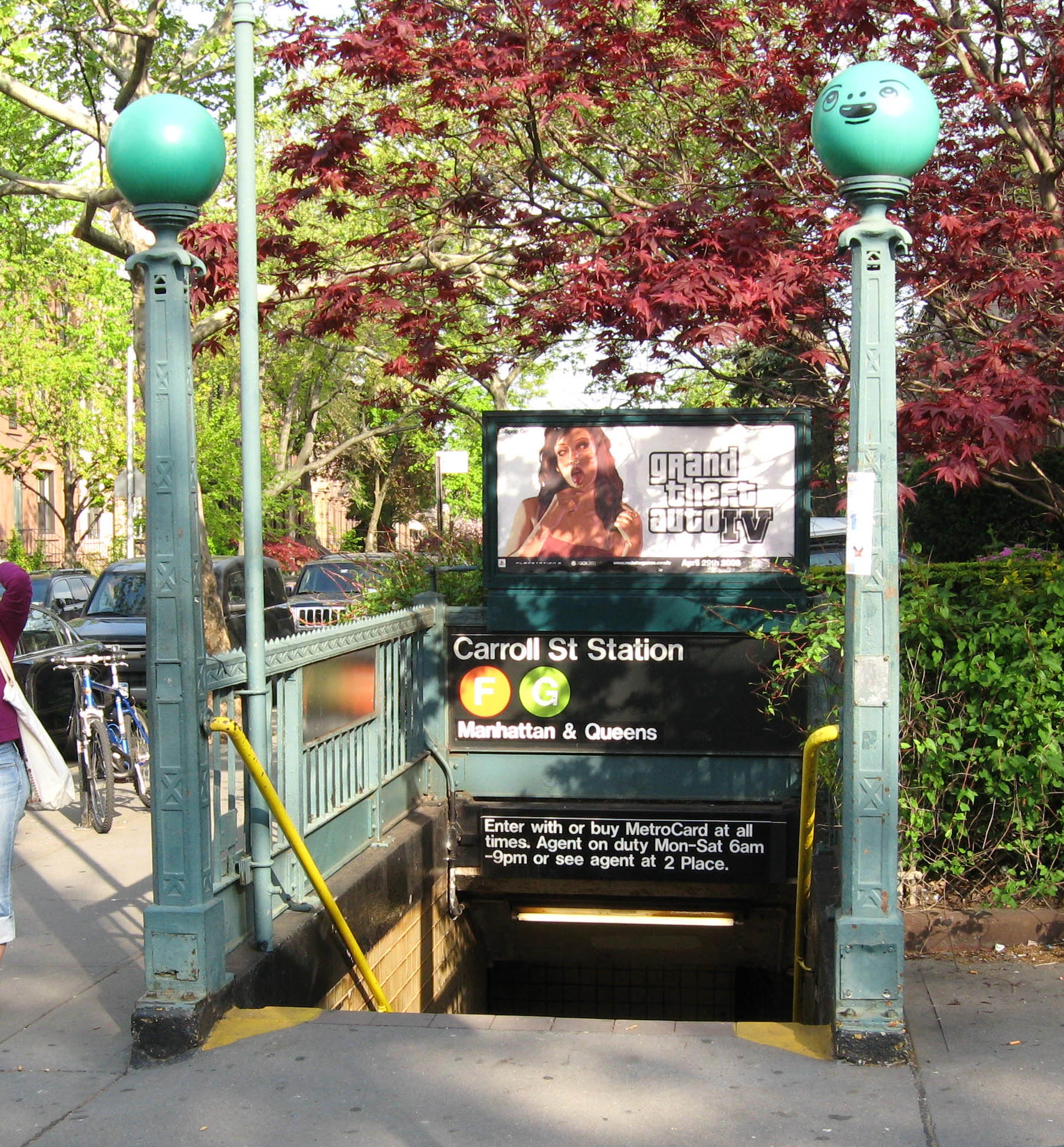
Street entrance

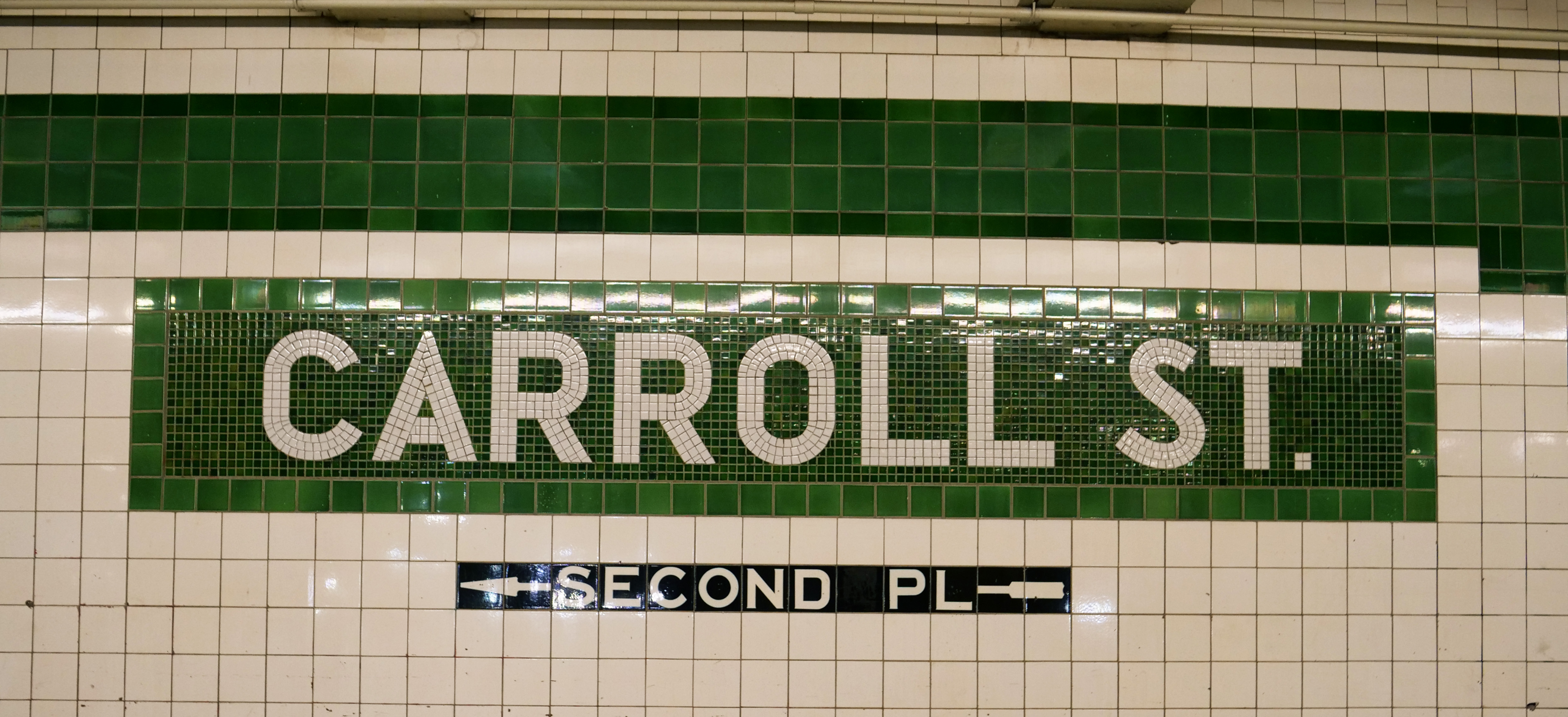
Name tablet mosaic

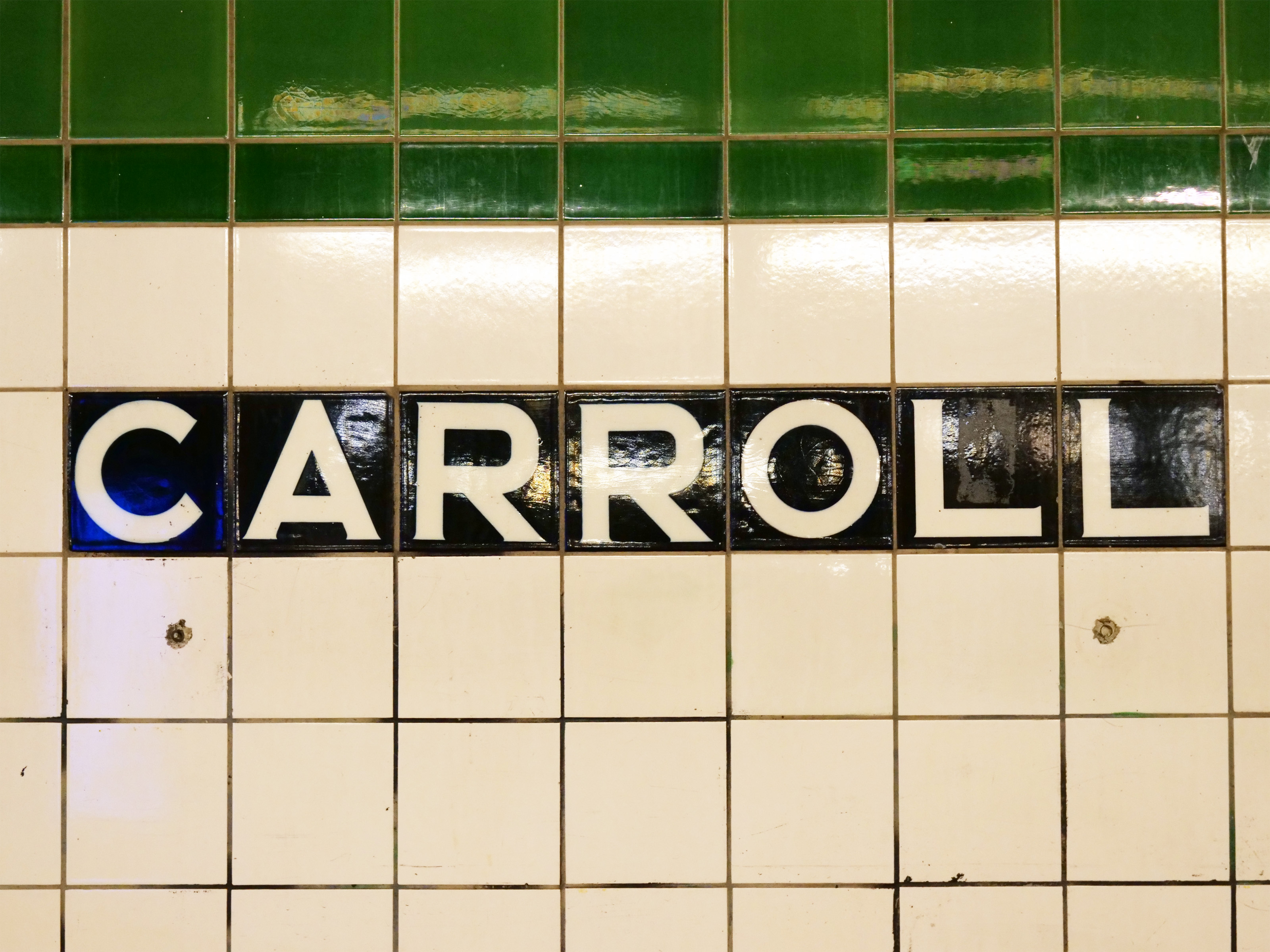
Tile caption

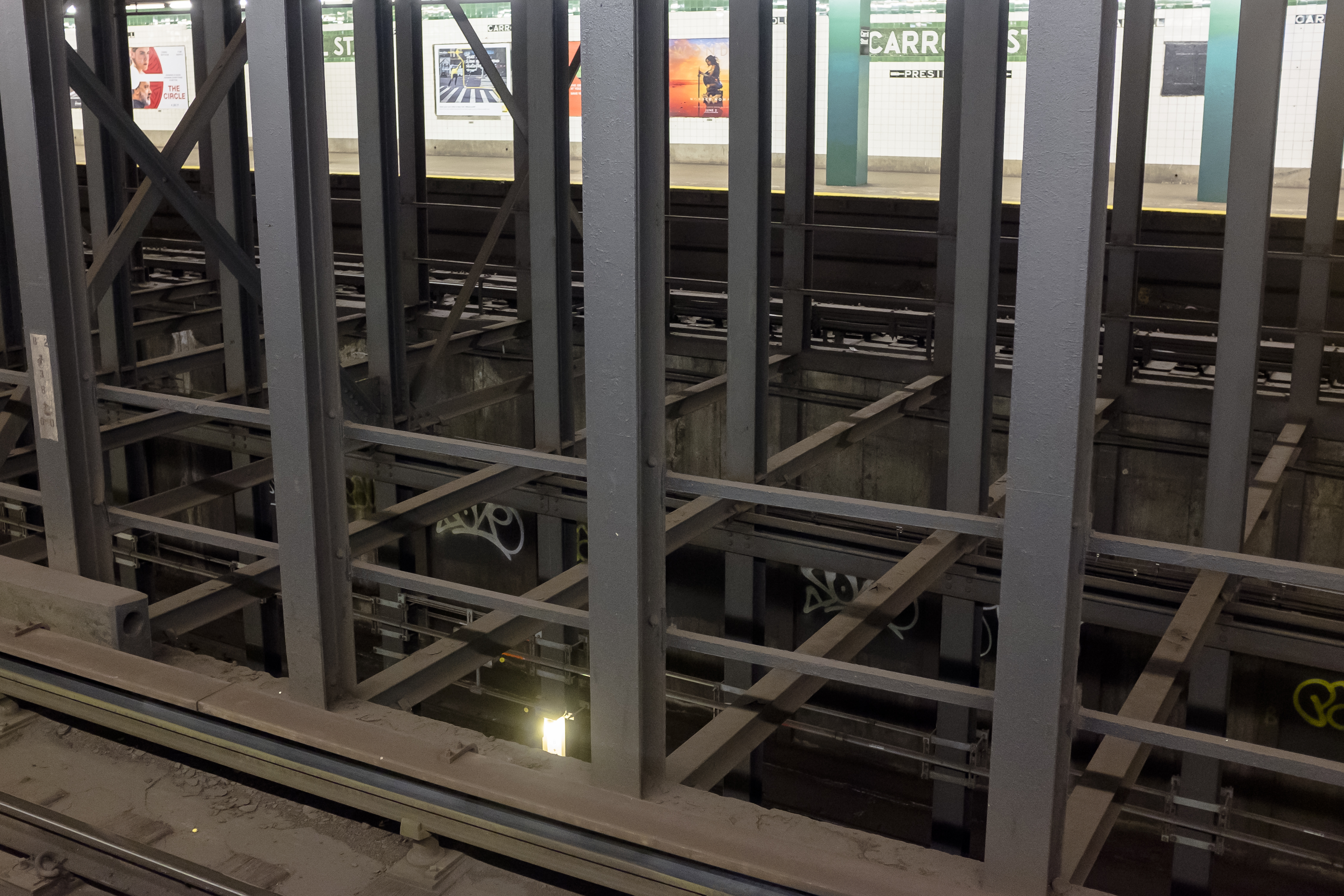
Sunken express tracks

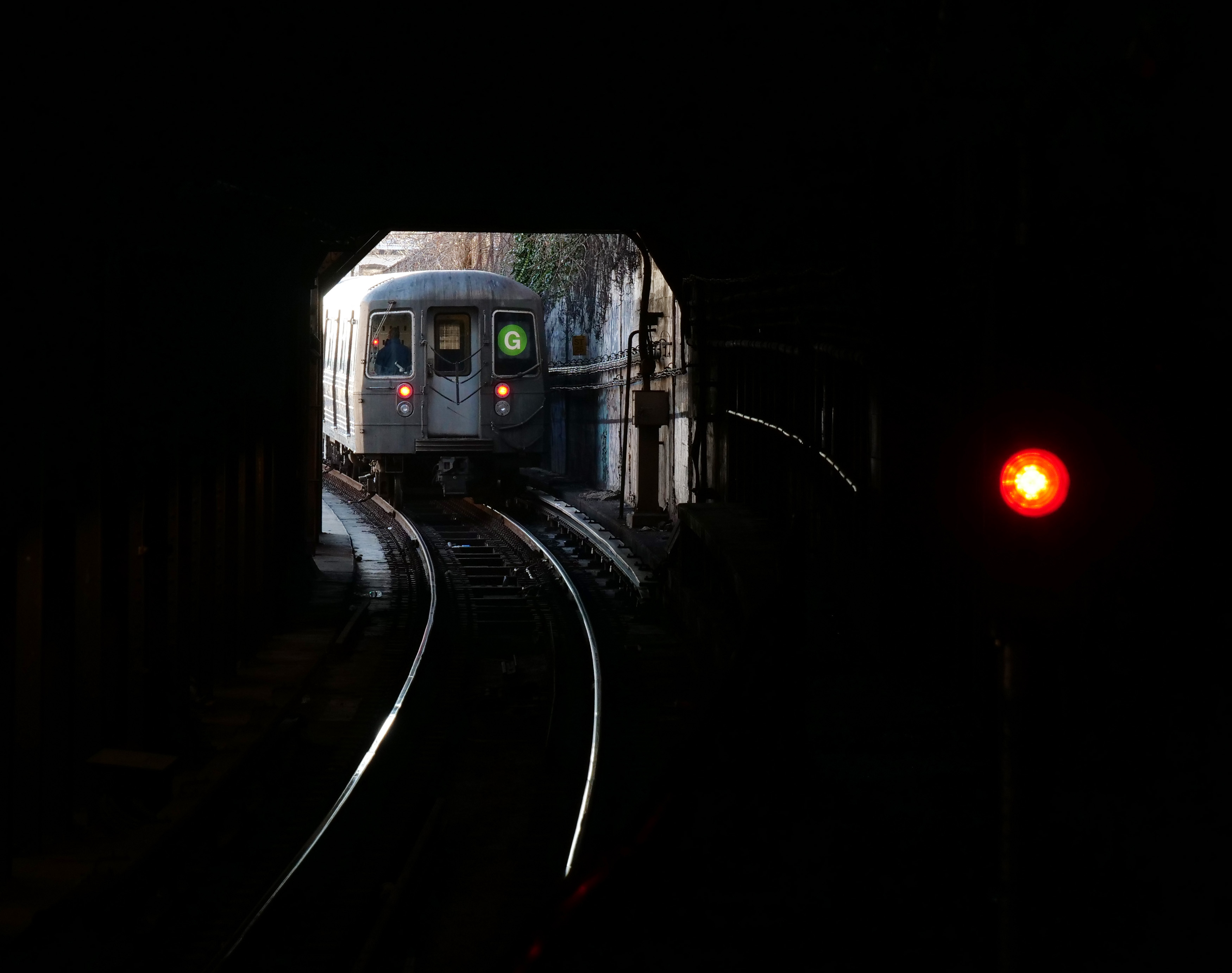
An R68 G train having just left the station
