= Fort Hamilton Parkway station (IND Culver Line) =

New York City Subway station in Brooklyn

Fort Hamilton Parkway
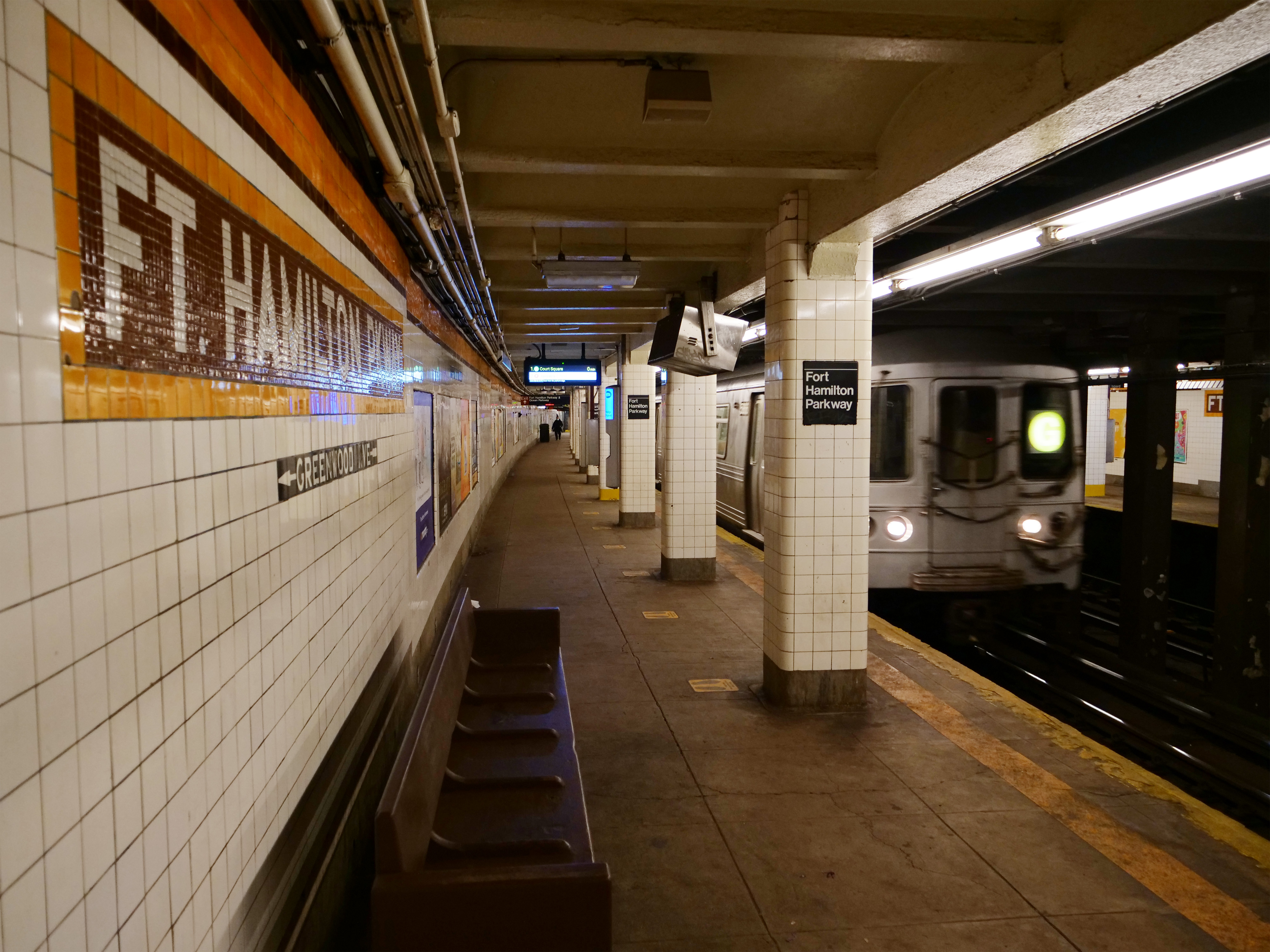
- G train arriving on the northbound platform

Station statistics
- Address: Fort Hamilton Parkway & Prospect Avenue; Brooklyn, New York
- Borough: Brooklyn
- Locale: Windsor Terrace
- Coordinates: 40°39′5.24″N 73°58′33.08″W
- Division: B (IND)
- Line: IND Culver Line
- Services: F (all times); G (all times)
- Transit: MTA Bus: B103, BM3, BM4
- Structure: Underground
- Platforms: 2 side platforms
- Tracks: 2

Other information
- Opened: October 7, 1933; 93 years ago

Traffic
- 2025: 1,423,886 ▲6%
- Rank: 237 out of 423
Services
Preceding station	New York City Subway	Following station
15th Street–Prospect Park via Bergen Street	Local	Church Avenue services split
does not stop here
Location
Location within New York City Subway
Location within New York City
Location within New York
Track layout
Street map
Station service legend
Symbol	Description
Stops all times	Stops all times

The Fort Hamilton Parkway station is a local station on the IND Culver Line of the New York City Subway. It is served by the F and G trains at all times. The <F> train skips this station when it operates.

This underground station, opened on October 7, 1933, has two tracks and two side platforms. The Culver Line's express tracks run underneath the station and are not visible from the platforms.

== History ==
One of the goals of Mayor John Hylan's Independent Subway System (IND), proposed in the 1920s, was a line to Coney Island, reached by a recapture of the BMT Culver Line. As originally designed, service to and from Manhattan would have been exclusively provided by Culver express trains, while all local service would have fed into the IND Crosstown Line. The line was extended from Bergen Street to Church Avenue on October 7, 1933, including the Fort Hamilton Parkway station.

The IND Culver Line's Church Avenue and Fort Hamilton Parkway stations were the last underground stations to get fluorescent lighting on platform level, which replaced the incandescent lighting in 1987.

The station received aesthetic improvements in early 2024 as part of the Re-New-Vation program. The work included new signage, lighting, and tiles.

=== Service patterns ===
The station was originally served by the A train. In 1936, the A was rerouted to the IND Fulton Street Line and was replaced by E trains from the Queens Boulevard Line. In 1937, the connection to the IND Crosstown Line opened and GG (later renamed the G) trains were extended to Church Avenue, complementing the E. In December 1940, after the IND Sixth Avenue Line opened, E trains were replaced by the F, and the GG was cut back to Smith–Ninth Streets. Following the completion of the Culver Ramp in 1954, D Concourse Express trains replaced F service to Coney Island. In November 1967, the Chrystie Street Connection opened and D trains were rerouted via the Manhattan Bridge and the BMT Brighton Line to Coney Island. F trains were extended once again via the Culver Line.

The station acted as a local-only station from 1968 to 1976, when F trains ran express in both directions between Bergen Street and Church Avenue during rush hours. G trains were extended from Smith–Ninth Streets to Church Avenue to provide local service. Express service between Bergen and Church ended in 1976 due to budgetary concerns and passenger complaints, and the GG, later renamed the G, was again terminated at the Smith–Ninth Streets station.

In July 2009, the G was again extended from its terminus at Smith–Ninth Streets to a more efficient terminus at Church Avenue to accommodate the rehabilitation of the Culver Viaduct. The G extension was made permanent in July 2012. In July 2019, the MTA revealed plans to restore express service on the Culver Line between Jay Street and Church Avenue. Express service started on September 16, 2019.

== Station layout ==
There are two local tracks and two side platforms. The express tracks run under the station and are not visible from the platforms.

Both platforms have an orange-yellow trim line with a medium red-brown border and mosaic name tablets reading "FT. HAMILTON PKWAY." in white sans-serif lettering on a red-brown background and orange-yellow border. There are several replacement tiles in bright orange-red throughout the station. Below the trim line are tile captions in white lettering on a black background reading "FT HAMILTON PKWAY", and below some of the name tablet mosaics are directional tile captions. Wide columns run along the platforms at regular intervals, alternating ones having the standard black name plate with white lettering. The tiles were part of a color-coded tile system used throughout the IND. The tile colors were designed to facilitate navigation for travelers going away from Lower Manhattan. As such, the yellow tiles used at Fort Hamilton Parkway were also used at Seventh Avenue, the next express station to the north, while a different tile color is used at Church Avenue, the next express station to the south. Yellow tiles are also used at 15th Street–Prospect Park, the only other local station between Seventh Avenue and Church Avenue.

South of this station, on the express tracks on the lower level, there are bellmouths for a proposed subway line along Fort Hamilton Parkway and/or the parallel Tenth Avenue. After diverging into two lines at around 65th Street, the mainline would have terminated at 86th Street in Bay Ridge, and the other line would travel west from the mainline towards a partially-built tunnel to Staten Island. An alternate plan proposed a connection to the BMT West End Line at New Utrecht Avenue. These lines were planned as part of the IND Second System.

=== Exits ===
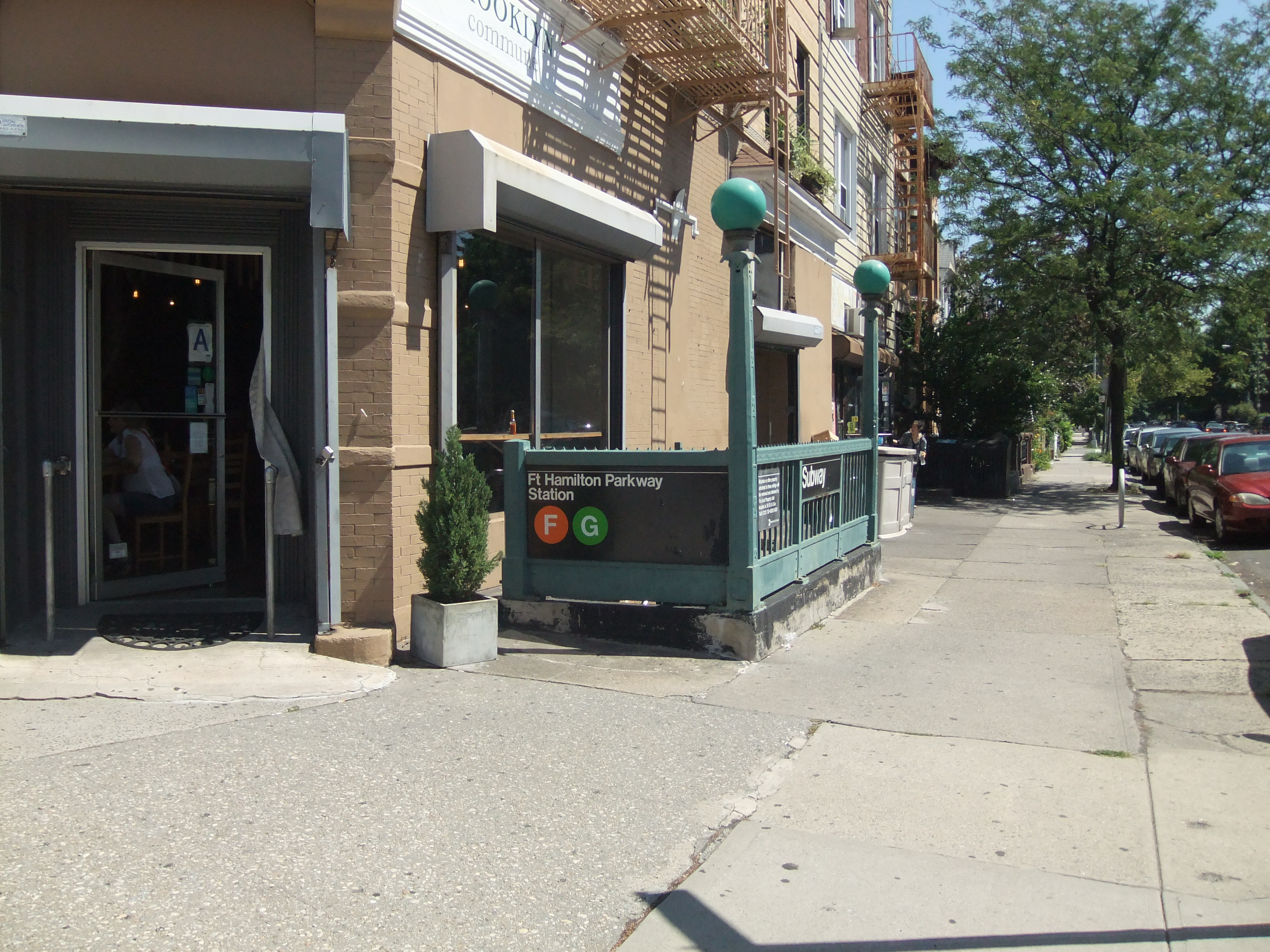
Northeastern staircase

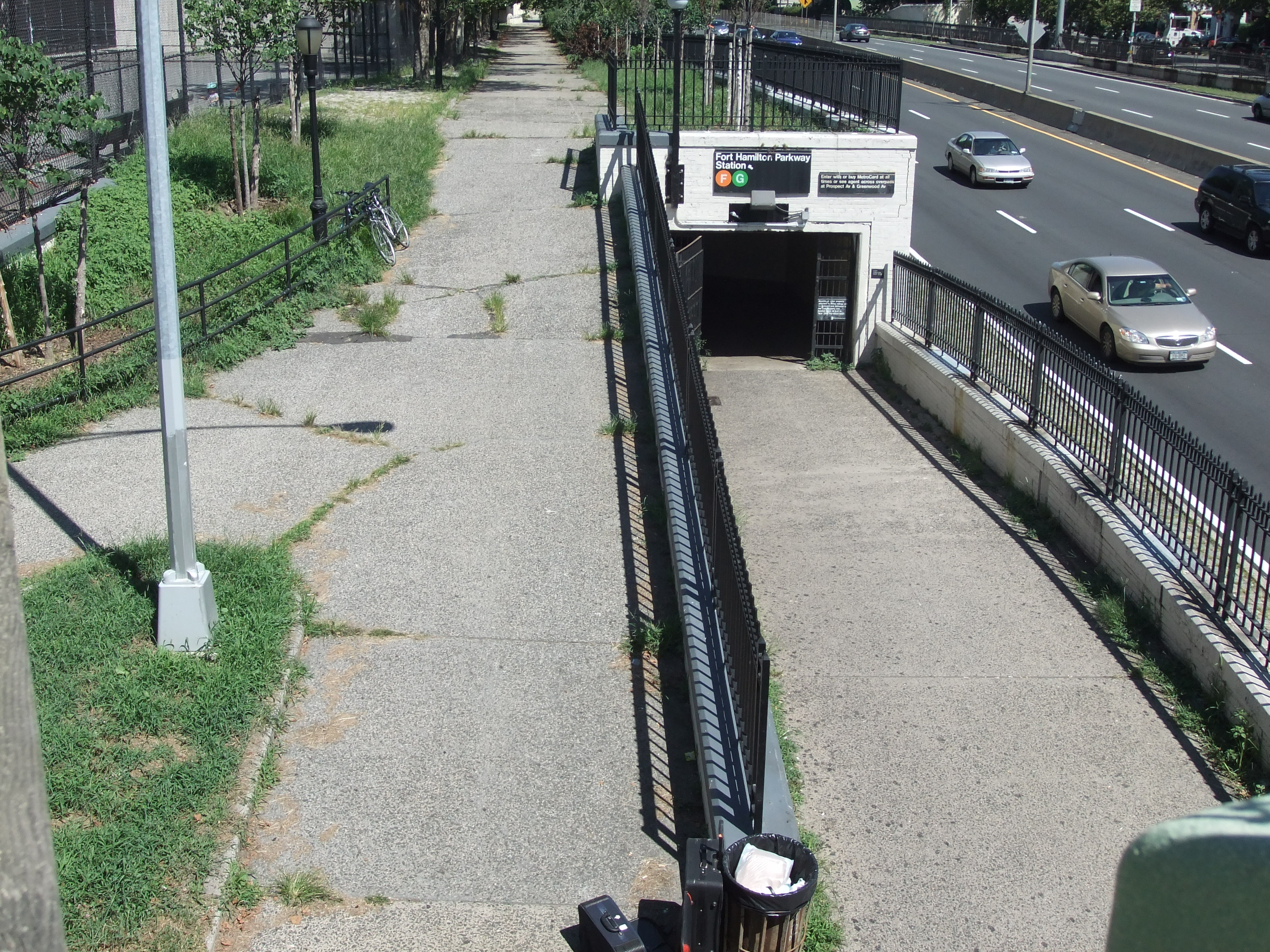
South ramp

The full-time, northern entrance is by Greenwood and Prospect Avenues, with two street staircases. A block-long passageway leads northward to the northeast corner of Prospect Avenue and Reeve Place for one additional street staircase. There is a closed staircase that would have led to a fare control area at platform level at the Manhattan-bound side. This area is gated shut, and about half of the space is taken by station facilities with additional tiles.

At the north end of the station, there is also a sealed entrance at the northwestern corner of Reeve Place and Prospect Avenue, which was never opened. The property owner of 1246 Prospect Avenue filed a suit, claiming that it obstructed access to their property, which was scheduled to be tried on January 20, 1936. Since the New York City Board of Transportation deemed that it would probably not be needed for a considerable period, it ordered that the closure of the stairway, the removal the entrance structure, and the slabbing over of the entrance be done at once. The report stated that the entrance could be reopened at its former location with the consent of the owner, or at the curb line, without their consent, when "traffic warrants reopening".

The south end exit is to Fort Hamilton Parkway and has full-time HEET access and a former booth. The only exit at this end is a ramp (no staircase) that runs along the western side of the Prospect Expressway, up and down a small hill. This exit replaced the original 1933 staircase exit, when Robert Moses built the expressway. From the mezzanine area, one can see the variation in tile colors and styles when the new entrance was added in 1962, coinciding with the opening of the expressway. This can be seen when facing the ramp.
