= Bartel-Pritchard Square =

Plaza in Brooklyn, New York

Bartel–Pritchard Square
- Traffic circle and public square
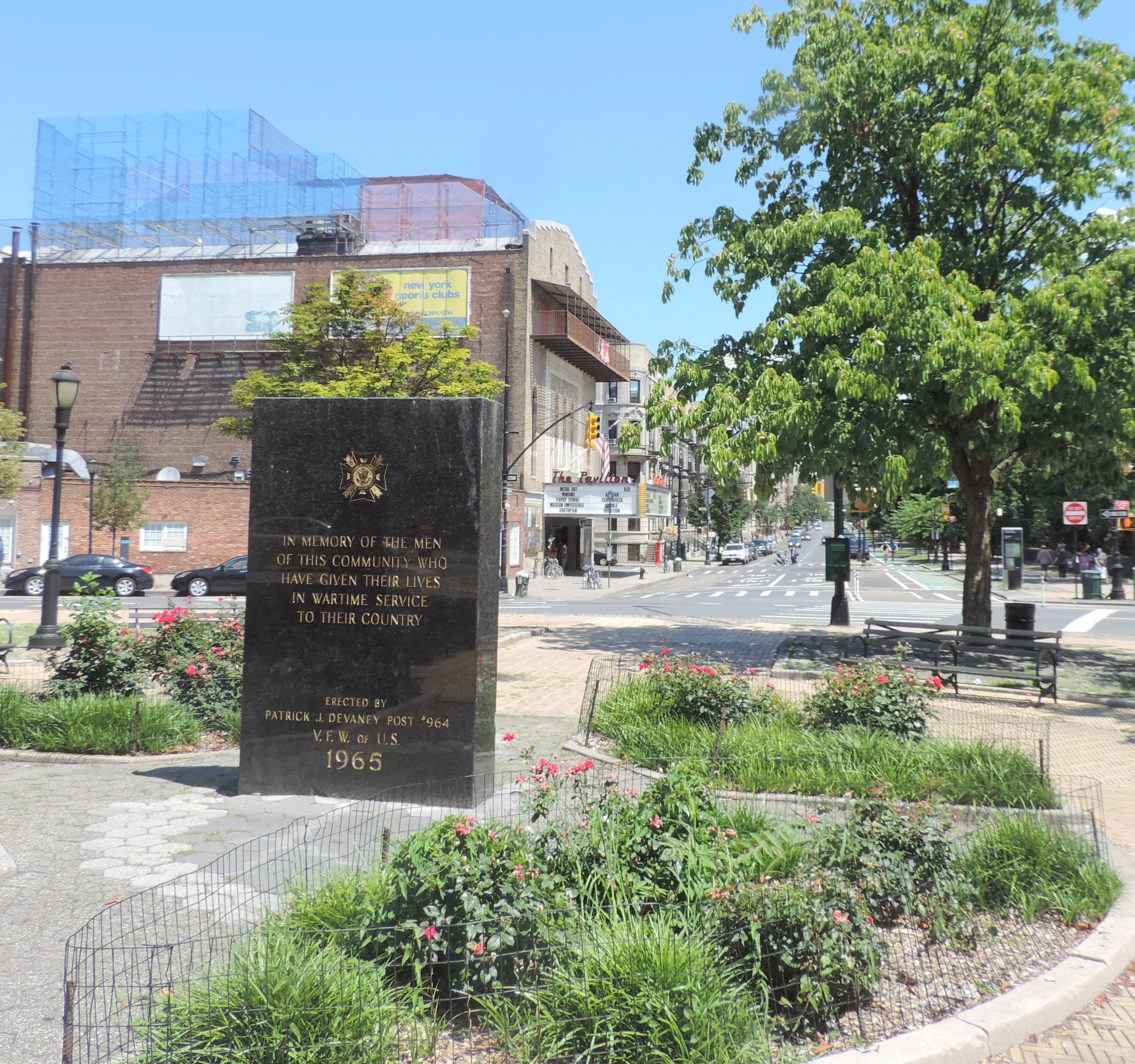
- 1965 granite monument
- Location: Park Slope / Windsor Terrace, Brooklyn, New York City, U.S.
- Address: Prospect Park West, Prospect Park Southwest & 15th Street
- Coordinates: 40°39′40″N 73°58′48″W

Bartel–Pritchard Square is a traffic circle and public space at the southwest entrance to Prospect Park in Brooklyn, New York City, at the junction of Prospect Park West, Prospect Park Southwest, and 15th Street. Named in 1923 for two local soldiers killed in World War I, the square functions as a neighborhood gateway, a venue for a long-running Greenmarket, and the site of a 1965 granite monument inscribed "For Valor and Sacrifice."

== History and design ==
Map of notable buildings and structures at Prospect Park (note: not all entrances shown). Click on points for more details.

The square occupies a circular junction that has existed since the opening years of Prospect Park in the late 19th century, serving as a gateway between Park Slope and Windsor Terrace. On April 10, 1923, New York City's Board of Aldermen named the site for Emil Bartel (1895–1918) and William Pritchard (1895–1918), Brooklyn friends who died in combat in France during World War I.

Two monumental classical granite columns topped with bronze tripods and bowls were added in the early 20th century at the entrance to the park and are attributed to architect Stanford White. The columns, which reference ancient acanthus motifs, were cast circa 1906 and dedicated circa 1911.

In 1965, a polished black granite memorial tablet inscribed "For Valor and Sacrifice" was installed in the center island to honor local residents who died in service. The square is directly adjacent to the New York City Subway's 15th Street–Prospect Park station on the IND Culver Line (served by the F and G trains), and across from Nitehawk Cinema Prospect Park.

== Traffic safety and redesigns ==
NYC DOT has undertaken multiple safety improvements around the circle, including new signals, channelization, re-striped crosswalks, and pedestrian space additions circa 2012, aiming to calm vehicle speeds and clarify movements at the complex junction. The square is also the southern terminus of the Prospect Park West protected bike lane; post-installation analyses reported large reductions in excessive speeding by drivers along the roadway.

== Recent incidents ==
On March 6, 2022, a high-speed crash and ensuing fire knocked the multi-ton "For Valor and Sacrifice" memorial off its plinth and destroyed benches in the center island. News outlets reported a white BMW entering the circle from Prospect Park West around 4 a.m.; the driver fled and a passenger was hospitalized in stable condition. NYC Parks repaired and re-erected the memorial within days.

Subsequent coverage noted that, as of mid-March 2022, NYPD had not announced arrests and that Parks completed the repair "in-house." Coverage also highlighted a history of traffic dangers at the circle.

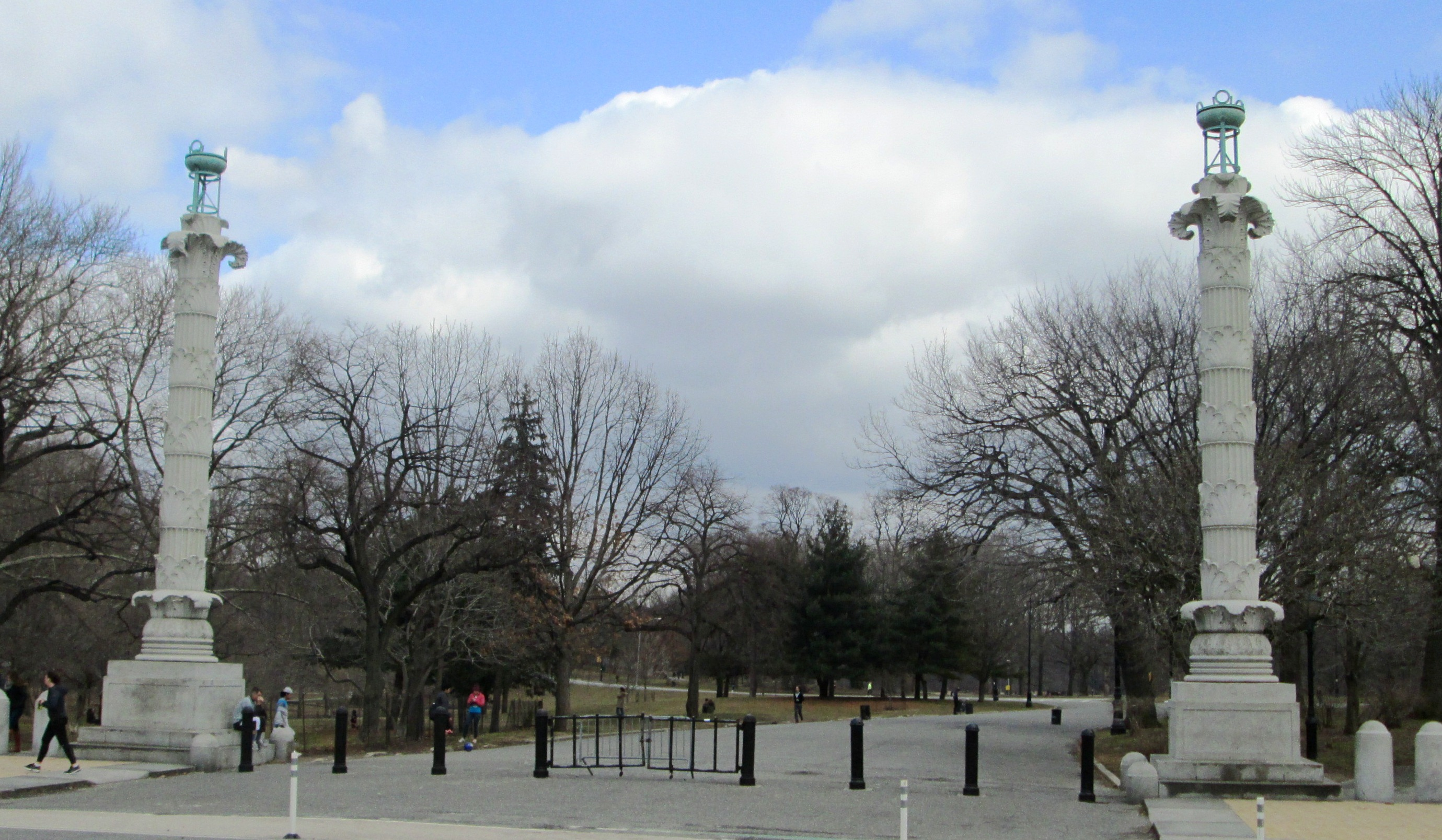
The Bartel-Pritchard Square columns

== Community use ==
GrowNYC operates a year-round Wednesday Greenmarket and a seasonal Sunday market on/around the square, featuring regional farmers and food producers.

== See also ==
- Prospect Park (Brooklyn)
- Grand Army Plaza
- Machate Circle
