= Seventh Avenue station (IND Culver Line) =

New York City Subway station in Brooklyn

7 Avenue
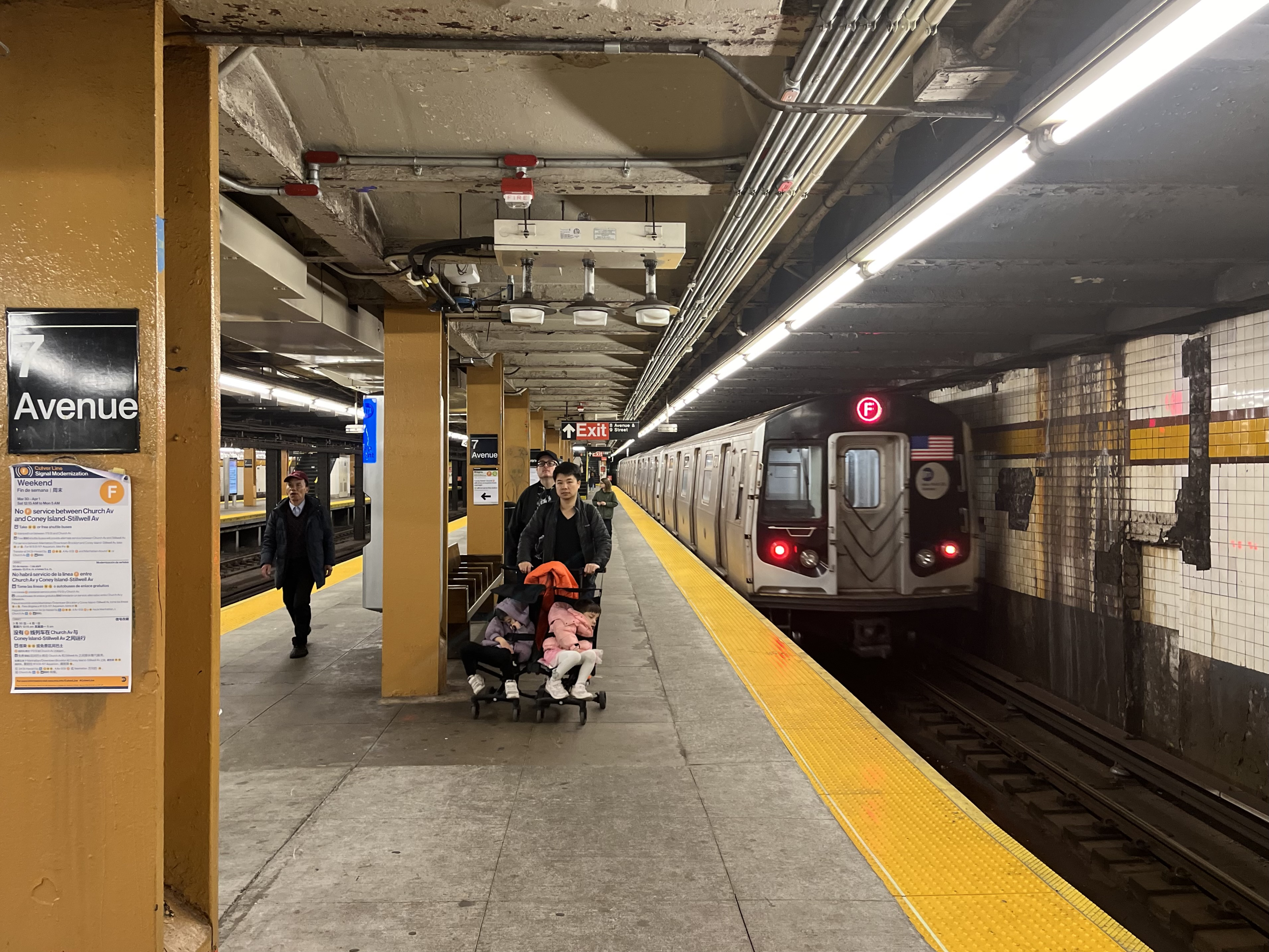
- R160 F train departing the southbound platform

Station statistics
- Address: Seventh Avenue & Ninth Street; Brooklyn, New York
- Borough: Brooklyn
- Locale: Park Slope
- Coordinates: 40°40′0.59″N 73°58′53.76″W
- Division: B (IND)
- Line: IND Culver Line
- Services: F (all times) <F> (two rush hour trains, peak direction); G (all times)
- Transit: NYCT Bus: B61, B67, B69
- Structure: Underground
- Platforms: 2 island platforms cross-platform interchange
- Tracks: 4

Other information
- Opened: October 7, 1933; 93 years ago
- Accessible: Yes
- Former/other names: Seventh Avenue–Park Slope

Traffic
- 2025: 2,977,239 ▲6.9%
- Rank: 127 out of 423
Services
Preceding station	New York City Subway	Following station
Jay Street–MetroTech <F> toward Jamaica–179th Street	Express	Church Avenue <F> toward Coney Island–Stillwell Avenue
Fourth Avenue F G via Bergen Street	Local	15th Street–Prospect Park F G via Church Avenue
Non-revenue services and lines
Preceding station	New York City Subway	Following station
Bergen Street express	no service	
Location
Location within New York City Subway
Location within New York City
Location within New York
Track layout
Street map
Station service legend
Symbol	Description
Stops all times	Stops all times
Stops rush hours in the peak direction only (limited service)	Stops rush hours in the peak direction only (limited service)

The Seventh Avenue station (also Seventh Avenue–Park Slope station) is an express station on the IND Culver Line of the New York City Subway, located at Seventh Avenue and Ninth Street in the Park Slope neighborhood of Brooklyn. It is served by the F and G trains at all times, and by the <F> train during rush hours in the peak direction.

The Seventh Avenue station was constructed by the Independent Subway System (IND). It opened on October 7, 1933, as part of an extension of the Culver Line, which was known as the Smith Street Line or the South Brooklyn Line at the time. Though the Seventh Avenue station contains four tracks and two island platforms, as with most New York City Subway express stations, the inner tracks see limited use, being used only by peak-direction <F> trains.

== History ==
One of the goals of Mayor John Hylan's Independent Subway System (IND), proposed in the 1920s, was a line to Coney Island, reached by a recapture of the BMT Culver Line. As originally designed, service to and from Manhattan would have been exclusively provided by Culver express trains, while all local service would have fed into the IND Crosstown Line. The line was extended from Bergen Street to Church Avenue on October 7, 1933, including the Seventh Avenue station.

The station received a $400,000 renovation starting in 2015. In January 2016, it was proposed to relocate the station booth to the 7th Avenue entrance (where 65% of entrances and exits occur). Most of the mezzanine would also be closed off, and the turnstiles would be replaced. Waist-high turnstiles at the 7th and 8th Avenue ends were installed in August 2016, replacing the HEETS. Much of the mezzanine closed permanently on January 23, 2018, at which time the station booth was relocated. A 2015 proposal to add elevators at the station was rejected because it would have cost $15 million; this prompted protests from local residents. In 2019, the MTA announced that this station would become ADA-accessible as part of the agency's 2020–2024 Capital Program. A contract for three elevators at the station was awarded in December 2020, and construction began in early 2022. The elevators officially opened on November 21, 2023.

=== Service changes ===
The station was originally served by the A train. In 1936, the A was rerouted to the IND Fulton Street Line and was replaced by E trains from the Queens Boulevard Line. In 1937, the connection to the IND Crosstown Line opened and GG (later renamed the G) trains were extended to Church Avenue, complementing the E. In December 1940, after the IND Sixth Avenue Line opened, E trains were replaced by the F, and the GG was cut back to Smith–Ninth Streets. Following the completion of the Culver Ramp in 1954, D Concourse Express trains replaced F service to Coney Island. In November 1967, the Chrystie Street Connection opened and D trains were rerouted via the Manhattan Bridge and the BMT Brighton Line to Coney Island. F trains were extended once again via the Culver Line.

The center tracks at the station were used for F express service starting in June 1968, while G trains were extended from Smith–Ninth Streets to Church Avenue to provide local service. Express service between Bergen and Church ended in 1976 due to budgetary concerns and passenger complaints, and the GG, later renamed the G, was again terminated at the Smith–Ninth Streets station.

In July 2009, the G was again extended from its terminus at Smith–Ninth Streets to a more efficient terminus at Church Avenue to accommodate the rehabilitation of the Culver Viaduct. The G extension was made permanent in July 2012. In July 2019, the MTA revealed plans to restore express service on the Culver Line between Jay Street and Church Avenue. Express service started on September 16, 2019.

== Station layout ==
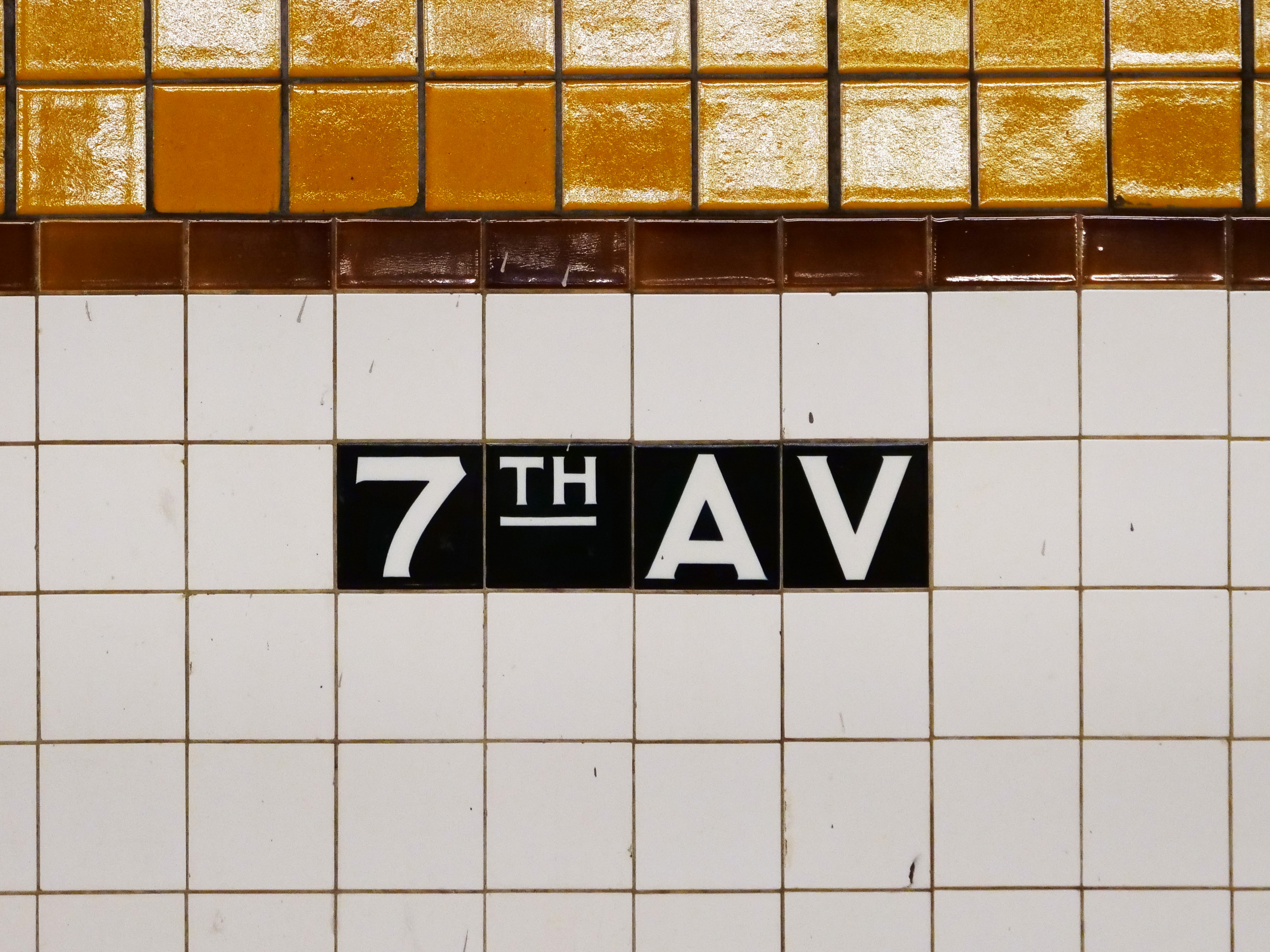
Tile caption below trim line

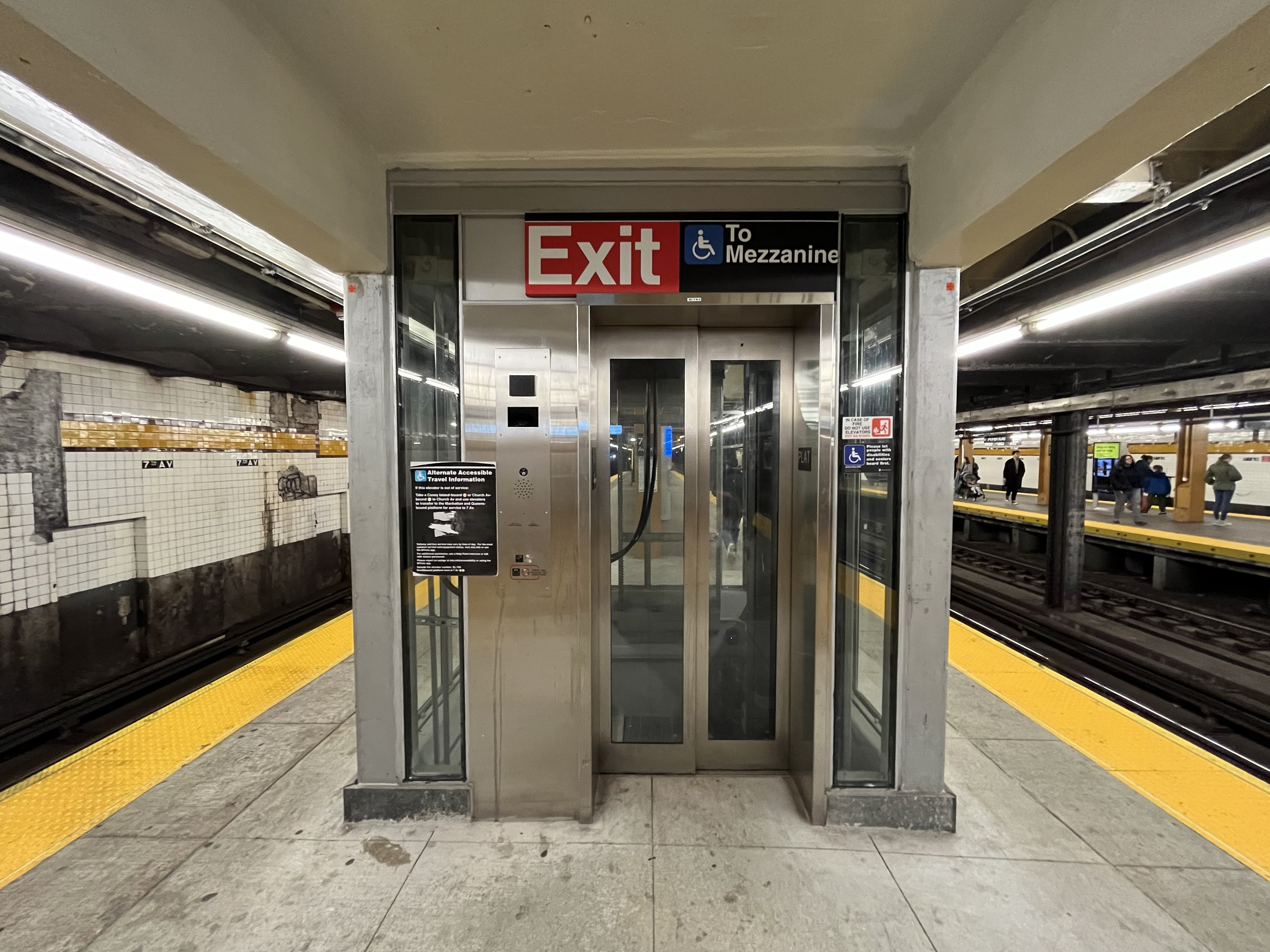
Elevator from the southbound platform

This station has two island platforms and four tracks. South of this station, the express tracks separate from the local tracks and rejoin beneath them north of Fort Hamilton Parkway, then rise up again. While this station is underground and Fourth Avenue is on an elevated trestle, this station is actually at a higher elevation than Fourth Avenue. This is because Brooklyn's topography slopes downwards towards the west (hence the neighborhood name of Park Slope), allowing the line to enter into the hillside between the two stations.

The tile band is mustard yellow with a sienna brown border, set in a three-high "express station" course. The top border is slightly wider than the bottom and bisects the center of the band at regular intervals; historical images show standard IND style color bands before 1972. The tiles were part of a color-coded tile system used throughout the IND. The tile colors were designed to facilitate navigation for travelers going away from Lower Manhattan. As such, a different tile color is used at Church Avenue, the next express station to the south; the yellow tiles used at the Seventh Avenue station are also used at 15th Street–Prospect Park and Fort Hamilton Parkway, the two local stations between Seventh Avenue and Church Avenue.

The station contains a full-length mezzanine with exits at 7th Avenue and 8th Avenue. Before January 2018, there was around 500 feet (150 m) of open mezzanine stretching across the station outside of fare control. while much of the space within fare control was fenced in. The full-time fare control area and station booth was located in the middle of the mezzanine, between 7th Avenue at 8th Avenue. Waist-high turnstiles led to single staircases to either platform. Unstaffed entrances were located at the either end of the station, allowing customers to exit the station without having to walk to the middle area. Full-height High Entry-Exit Turnstiles (HEETs) were formerly present at these locations. There was a passageway within fare control from the platform stairs at 7th Avenue to a HEET turnstile leading to the station booth. One elevator and four staircases go down to each platform, two at the 7th Avenue end and two at the 8th Avenue end. One staircase from each platform formerly led to the mezzanine, but has been closed off. Crossovers between service directions are available at all staircases.

=== Exits ===
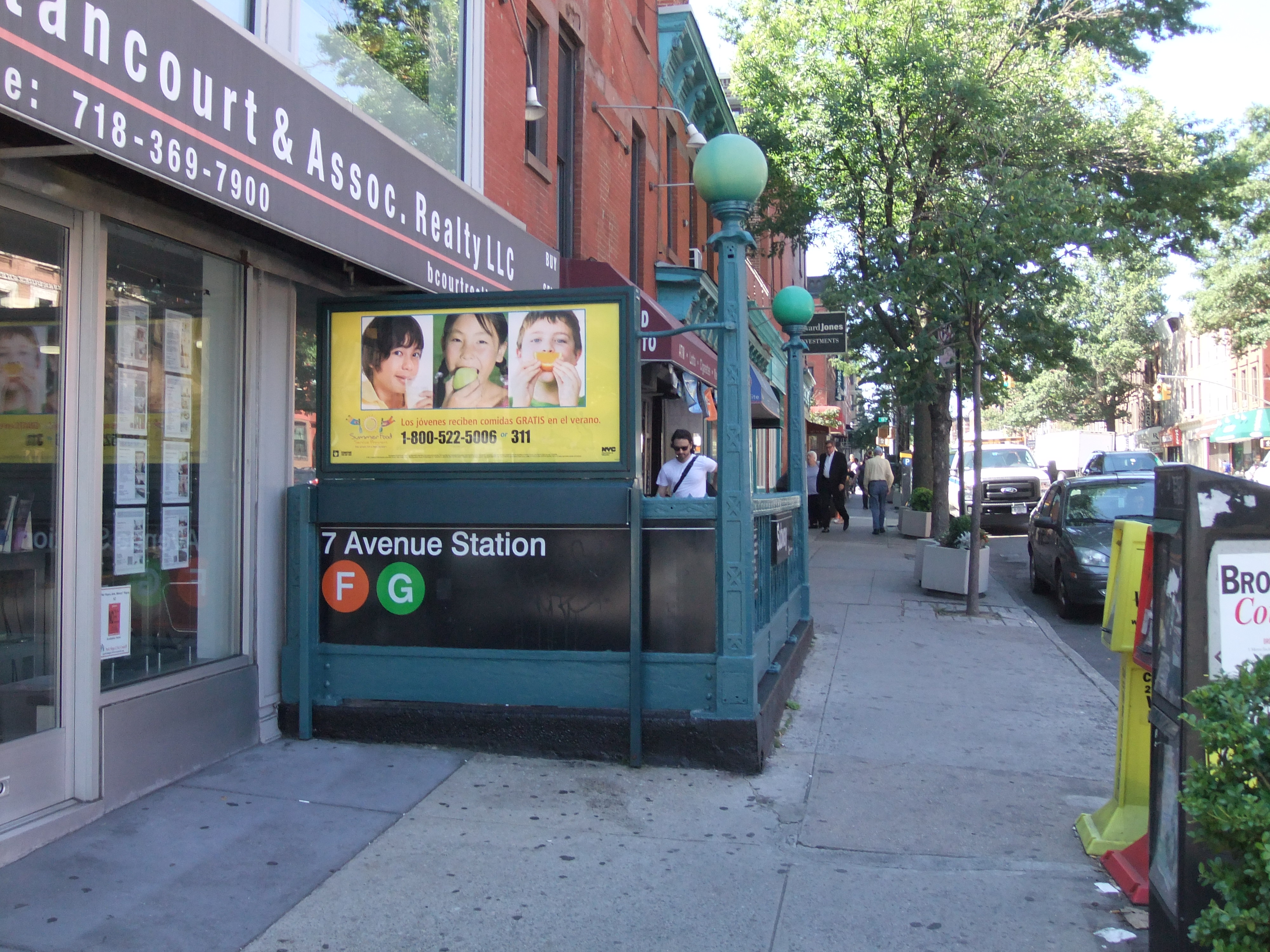
Northern street stair

There are eight street stairs – four going up to all four corners of 9th Street and 7th Avenue, and four going up to all four corners of 9th Street and 8th Avenue. An elevator to the mezzanine is on the northwest corner of 7th Avenue and 9th Street. The 8th Avenue entrance also has an intermediate level at the first staircase, otherwise a descending hill.

Inside the fare control near the Eighth Avenue entrance is a large scale painting of Prospect Park's The Raven.
