= Bergen Street station (IND Culver Line) =

New York City Subway station in Brooklyn

Bergen Street
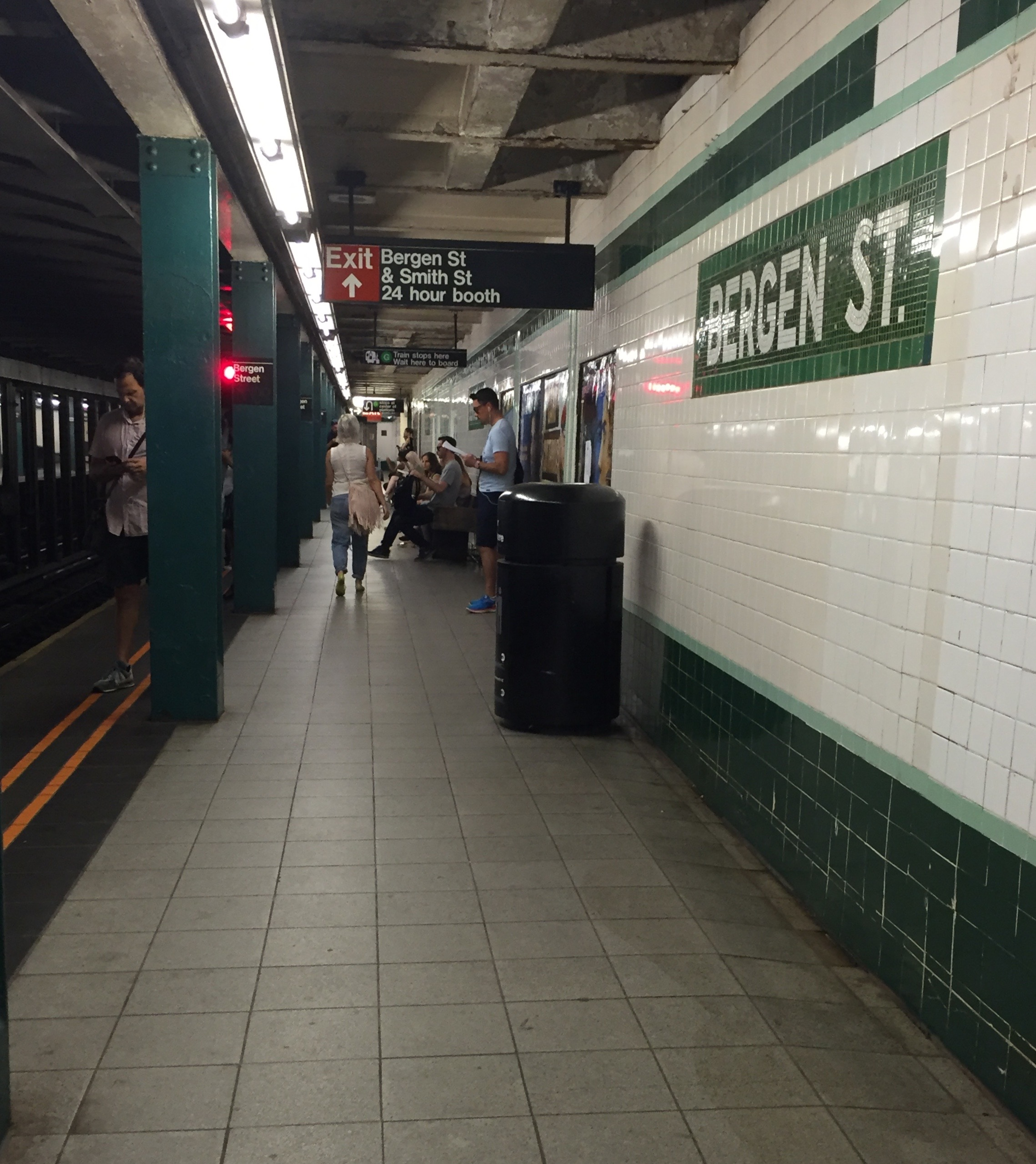
- Northbound platform

Station statistics
- Address: Bergen Street & Smith Street; Brooklyn, New York
- Borough: Brooklyn
- Locale: Boerum Hill, Cobble Hill
- Coordinates: 40°41′14.11″N 73°59′24.02″W
- Division: B (IND)
- Line: IND Culver Line
- Services: F (all times); G (all times)
- Transit: NYCT Bus: B57, B65
- Structure: Underground
- Levels: 2 (lower level platforms not in revenue service)
- Platforms: 4 side platforms (2 on each level; 2 on upper level in regular service)
- Tracks: 4

Other information
- Opened: March 20, 1933 (93 years ago)
- Accessibility: Same-platform transfer available

Traffic
- 2025: 2,938,443 ▲9.7%
- Rank: 130 out of 423
Services
Preceding station	New York City Subway	Following station
Jay Street–MetroTech toward Jamaica–179th Street	Local	Carroll Street via Church Avenue
Hoyt–Schermerhorn Streets toward Court Square	Local	Carroll Street via Church Avenue
Non-revenue services and lines
Preceding station	New York City Subway	Following station
Jay Street–MetroTech express	no service	Seventh Avenue express
does not stop here
Location
Location within New York City Subway
Location within New York City
Location within New York
Track layout
Upper level
Lower level
Street map
Station service legend
Symbol	Description
Stops all times	Stops all times

The Bergen Street station is a local station on the IND Culver Line of the New York City Subway, located at the intersection of Bergen Street and Smith Street on the border of Cobble Hill and Boerum Hill in Brooklyn. It is served by the F and G trains at all times. The <F> train skips this station when it operates.

The Bergen Street station was constructed by the Independent Subway System (IND). It opened on March 20, 1933, as the original terminus of what was known as the Smith Street Line or the South Brooklyn Line at the time. The station opened in advance of the opening of the remainder of the line to allow for it to compete with existing streetcar lines belonging to the Brooklyn–Manhattan Transit Corporation (BMT). Once the rest of the line was opened on October 7, 1933, the line was extended, making Bergen Street a station for through trains. Bergen Street was renovated in the 1990s.

Bergen Street was constructed as a bi-level express station, though only the upper level is in use. The lower level is neither in regular service nor usable due to its deteriorated condition. The lower level was used when express service was provided on the Culver Line between 1968 and 1976. Express service was eliminated due to the loss of direct local service along the line to Manhattan. The express platforms were permanently removed from service during the 1990s, and due to a fire in 1999 the relay room was damaged, making the express tracks unusable. The relay room was rebuilt in 2008, and after repairs were done on the line, the implementation of express service became feasible. In 2019, express service returned to the line, though express trains bypass the Bergen Street station due to the high cost of rebuilding the express platforms, thus making Bergen Street a local station.

== History ==
Bergen Street opened on March 20, 1933, as the first station of the IND Culver Line. Service began one month after the expansion of the IND into Brooklyn to Jay Street–Borough Hall. The station's construction was expedited in order to both connect with and compete with the Bergen Street and Smith Street streetcar lines of the Brooklyn–Manhattan Transit Corporation (BMT). Construction was slightly stalled due to delays in the delivery of steel flues for the ventilation system.

Upon opening, only the primary entrances of the station at Bergen Street (see § Exits) were in use, with the southern exits completed at a later date. The first express train for Manhattan from Bergen Street left at 6:25 A.M. carrying 30 passengers, and the first rush hour of service for the station brought 121 passengers, of which most came from the Bergen and Smith Street Line trolleys of the BMT. Only the Bergen Street entrance was ready in time for the station's opening, leaving the Smith Street entrance to open at a later date. A and C trains from the IND Eighth Avenue Line terminated here, running to 207th Street in Manhattan and 205th Street in the Bronx respectively. A southward extension to Church Avenue opened on October 7 of that same year. In 1937, the IND Crosstown Line was connected to the station, served by the GG train (today's G service).

The lower-level express platforms, while built with the rest of the station, were only operated between 1968 and 1976 when express service was operated along the line. They were permanently removed from service in 1992, and support facilities were added to the platforms. There are no plans to restore express service to the station, even with the introduction of limited rush-hour F express service on the IND Culver Line in 2019.

Around the 1990s, the station was modernized. After water shorted out old wires in the station, on March 11, 1999, a major fire occurred originating in an equipment room on the station's lower level. A 1930s-era relay room, which controlled the interlocking north of the station, was destroyed in the fire. The station was closed for several months, with G service suspended south of Hoyt–Schermerhorn Streets and F trains bypassing the station at a lower-than-normal operating speed. Signals and switches at the station were replaced and modernized after the fire, and again in Fall 2008 when the relay room was rebuilt.

In July 2019, the MTA revealed plans to restore express service on the Culver Line between Jay Street and Church Avenue by mid-September 2019. The Bergen Street's lower level, however, would not be restored and reactivated for express service. This is in spite of the fact that the station is one of the most heavily used on the line. Express service started on September 16, 2019.

== Station layout ==
Bergen Street is laid out similar to other subway stations located below narrow streets, with two levels. The upper level is served by F and G trains at all times and they always make local stops, while the lower level is only used during rush hours in the peak direction by non-stopping <F> trains, which always make express stops. The next station to the north is Jay Street–MetroTech for F trains and Hoyt-Schermerhorn Streets for G trains, while the next station to the south is Carroll Street.

The station is directly beneath the street and has no mezzanine, making it one of only two as-built express stations (Note: The lower level platforms are currently unusable, and thus, it can only be used as a local station.) in the system that do not allow free transfers between directions. Passengers wishing to transfer between southbound and northbound F and G trains cannot do so at this station. (Note: The other one is 86th Street on the IRT Lexington Avenue Line.)

Both platforms on the upper level have a dark green trim line on a lime green border which was installed during the 1990s renovations. New tiles replaced the original small "BERGEN" tiles, and covered existing advertisement panels. The only uncovered original tiles are the mosaic name tablets reading "BERGEN ST." in white sans-serif lettering on a dark green background and green border. The tiles were part of a color-coded tile system used throughout the IND. The tile colors were designed to facilitate navigation for travelers going away from Lower Manhattan. As such, a different tile color is used at Seventh Avenue, the next express station to the south; the original green tiles used at the Bergen Street station were also used at local stations between Bergen Street and Seventh Avenue. Dark green I-beam columns run along the entire length of both platforms at regular intervals with alternating ones having the standard black station name plate with white lettering.

=== Exits ===
Exit location	Exit type	Number of exits	Platform served
NW corner of Bergen Street and Smith Street	Staircase	1	Southbound
SW corner of Bergen Street and Smith Street	Staircase	1	Southbound
NE corner of Bergen Street and Smith Street	Staircase	1	Northbound
SE corner of Bergen Street and Smith Street	Staircase	1	Northbound
NW corner of Warren Street and Smith Street	Staircase	1	Southbound
NE corner of Warren Street and Smith Street	Staircase	1	Northbound

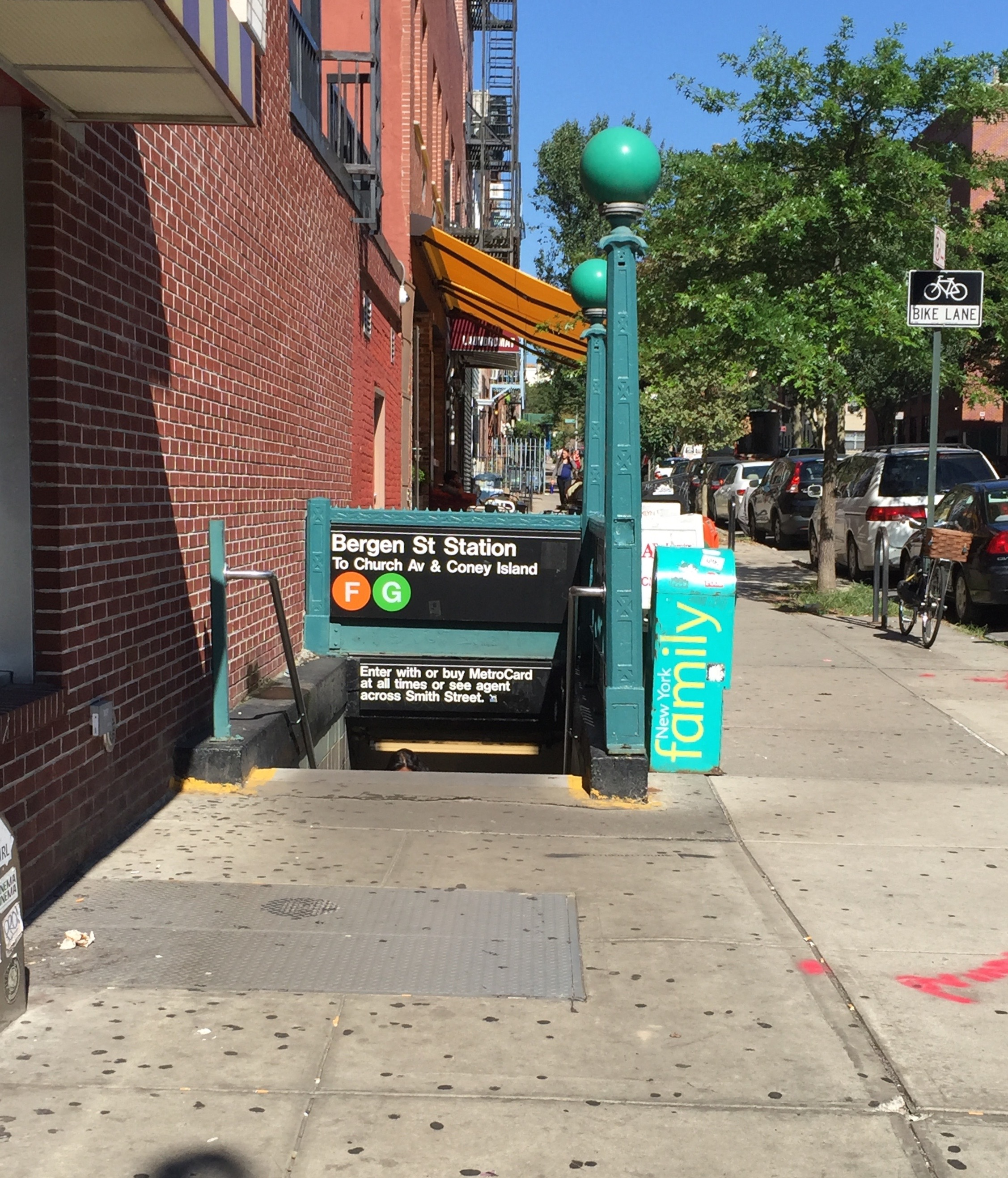
Brooklyn-bound entrance at Bergen Street and Smith Street

Each platform has two same-level fare control areas, one at either end of the station, and there are no crossovers or crossunders. The full-time ones are at the north end and each has a turnstile bank, token booth, and two street stairs. The ones on the Manhattan-bound platform go up to the northeast and southeast corners of Bergen and Smith Streets while those on the Coney Island-bound platform go up to the northwest and southwest corners. The fare control areas on the south end of the platforms are unstaffed, containing full height turnstiles and one street stair to the northeast corner of Warren and Smith Streets on the Manhattan-bound platform and the northwest corner for the Coney Island-bound platform. The south fare control area is more heavily used.

=== Tracks and platforms ===
Bergen Street's lower level, though opened at the same time as the upper level, was not used in revenue service until 1968, when rush hour F express service along the IND Culver Line began. This service ran until 1976, ending due to service cuts and complaints from Culver local residents about losing direct access to Manhattan. The lower level was abandoned afterward; trains rerouted via the express tracks during construction or service disruptions bypass the station towards Jay Street (northbound) or 7th Avenue (southbound). The lower-level platforms have not been used since except for a scene for the movie Jacob's Ladder. The tile was removed during renovations in the 1990s, leaving unpainted concrete and corrugated metal, old lights and signage (including original IND signs reading "BERGN" on support pillars), and modern Exit signs, none of which are in usable condition. The only remaining IND tilework exists in the stairwells between the levels, with directional tile plaques reading "EXPRESS TRAINS" and pointing to the lower level. Steel doors on the upper level block access to the staircases to the lower level, which is used for support facilities, storage of heavy equipment and occasional layups of A and C trains.

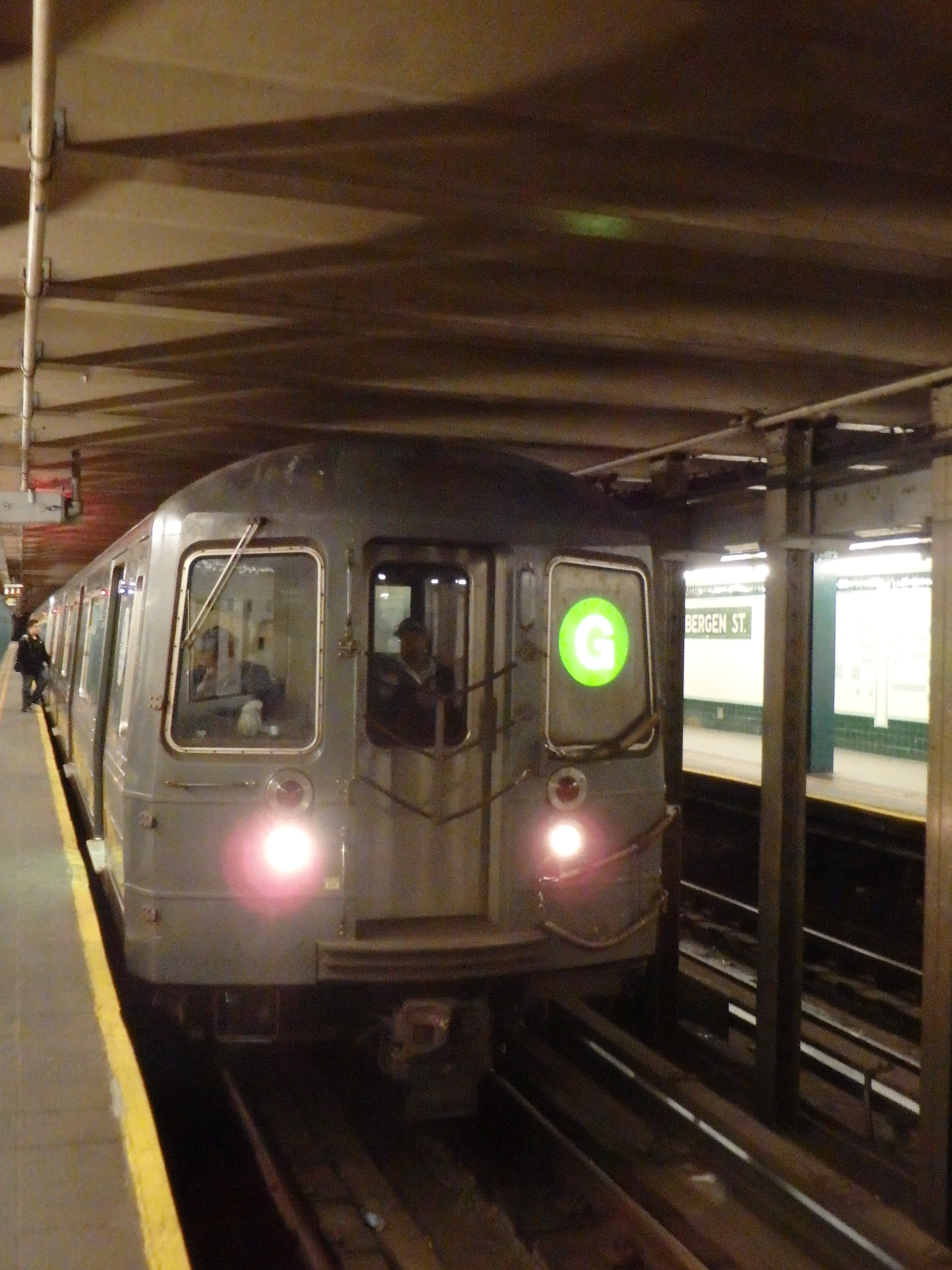
A G train of R68A cars at the station

A study on implementing an F express variant on the Culver Line found that reopening Bergen Street's lower level for express trains had potential benefits, including relieving passenger congestion along the heavily used northern section of the line, but that the costs of reopening the lower level outweighed the benefits. When the station was used for express service, passengers would wait on the staircases to see which level the next Manhattan-bound train would arrive at. In the early 2010s, this occurred at the Delancey Street/Essex Street station where passengers wait to see whether a northbound F train arrives on the lower level, or whether a northbound M train arrives on the upper level, since both services operate local along the Sixth Avenue Line north of that point. Repairs to restore the lower level to operating conditions, as well as required upgrades to make the station ADA-accessible, are estimated to cost over $75 million. As the MTA has deemed restoring the lower level to be prohibitively expensive, F express trains – which resumed service in September 2019 – bypass the station.

At the north (Manhattan- and Queens-bound) end of the upper level, the Culver Line local tracks diverge, splitting into four tracks. The F train, using the outer pair of tracks, ramps down to the lower level, merges with the innermost, express tracks located on the lower level, and continues north to Jay Street–MetroTech. Meanwhile, the G train, using the inner pair of tracks, stays on the upper level before making a hard right turn east under Schermerhorn Street to Hoyt–Schermerhorn Streets. The lower level tracks can only be reached by trains running to or from Jay Street–MetroTech since they do not connect to the IND Crosstown Line.

Both levels have a switch south of the platforms, allowing terminating trains to reverse direction. The switches were used when the station was the southern terminus of the line.
