= Church Avenue station (IND Culver Line) =

New York City Subway station in Brooklyn

Church Avenue
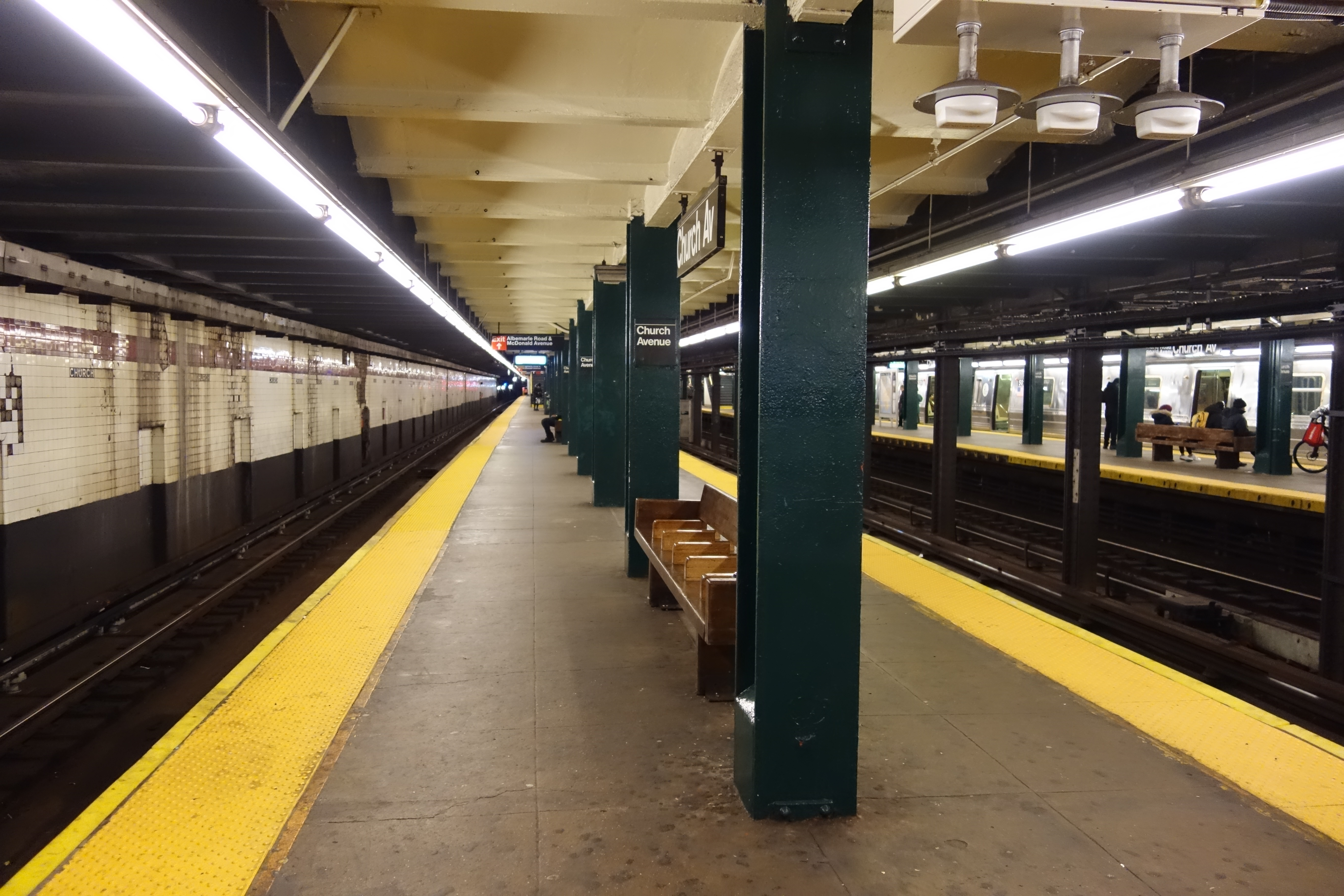
- View from the southbound platform

Station statistics
- Address: Church Avenue & McDonald Avenue; Brooklyn, New York
- Borough: Brooklyn
- Locale: Kensington
- Coordinates: 40°38′34″N 73°58′46″W
- Division: B (IND)
- Line: IND Culver Line
- Services: F (all times) <F> (two rush hour trains, peak direction); G (all times)
- Transit: NYCT Bus: B35, B67, B69; MTA Bus: B103 (southbound only), BM3, BM4 (drop-off only)
- Structure: Underground
- Platforms: 2 island platforms cross-platform interchange
- Tracks: 4

Other information
- Opened: October 7, 1933; 93 years ago
- Accessible: Yes

Traffic
- 2025: 2,111,292 ▲4%
- Rank: 172 out of 423
Services
Preceding station	New York City Subway	Following station
Seventh Avenue <F> toward Jamaica–179th Street	Express	Ditmas Avenue F <F> toward Coney Island–Stillwell Avenue
Fort Hamilton Parkway F G via Bergen Street	Local	Ditmas Avenue F <F> toward Coney Island–Stillwell Avenue
Fort Hamilton Parkway F G via Bergen Street	Local	Terminus
Non-revenue services and lines
Preceding station	New York City Subway	Following station
	no service	18th Avenue express
Location
Location within New York City Subway
Location within New York City
Location within New York
Track layout
Church Avenue Yard
Street map
Station service legend
Symbol	Description
Stops all times	Stops all times
Stops rush hours in the peak direction only (limited service)	Stops rush hours in the peak direction only (limited service)
Stops weekdays and weekday late nights	Stops weekdays and weekday late nights

The Church Avenue station is an express station on the IND Culver Line of the New York City Subway. Located at Church and McDonald Avenues in Kensington, Brooklyn, it is served by the F and G trains at all times (the latter of which terminates here), and by the <F> train during rush hours in the peak direction.

The Church Avenue station was constructed by the Independent Subway System (IND). It opened on October 7, 1933, as the new terminal of the Culver Line, which was known as the Smith Street Line or the South Brooklyn Line at the time. In 1954, this station ceased to be the line's terminal with the completion of the Culver Ramp, which connected the South Brooklyn Line and the Brooklyn–Manhattan Transit Corporation (BMT)'s Culver Line and allowing service to run to Coney Island. Though the Church Avenue station contains four tracks and two island platforms, as with many express stations in the New York City Subway, the inner tracks see limited use, being used only by peak-direction <F> trains.

== History ==
The Church Avenue station was the original southern terminus of the IND Culver Line, which was built as part of Mayor John Hylan's Independent Subway System (IND) to Coney Island. The line was planned to be extended to the south via a connection to the Brooklyn–Manhattan Transit Corporation (BMT)'s Culver Line. To connect this line to the Eighth Avenue Line – the main trunk of the IND – a subway line was to run from Brooklyn Borough Hall south under Jay Street, Smith Street, Ninth Street, and several other streets to Cortelyou Road (later Church Avenue) and McDonald Avenue, just north of the Ditmas Avenue elevated station. A ramp would then lead onto the elevated BMT Culver Line. As originally designed, service to and from Manhattan would have been exclusively provided by Culver express trains, while all local service would have fed into the IND Crosstown Line. On October 7, 1933, this station opened as the new terminal of the line, as the line was extended from Bergen Street.

Construction on the Culver Ramp, also referred to as the Culver Line Connection, between this station and the Ditmas Avenue station, began in June 1941 and was scheduled to be completed by the end of the year. The ramp was expected to cost $2 million, and along with new signals, and rehabilitation of the Culver elevated and lengthening of its stations to IND standards, the total cost of the project was estimated at over $11 million. Though the ramp was nearly complete, including rails and signal work, construction was halted later that year because of America's entrance into World War II. When the project was restarted in 1946, completion was delayed further due to continued material shortages and a lack of rolling stock to facilitate the new service. On October 30, 1954, the connection between the IND Brooklyn Line at Church Avenue and the BMT Culver Line at Ditmas Avenue opened, allowing IND trains to operate all the way to the Coney Island–Stillwell Avenue terminal.

In 1958, there was a program in which subway riders could get their clothes dry cleaned at the station for a fee.

=== Service changes ===
The station was originally served by the A train. In 1936, the A was rerouted to the IND Fulton Street Line and was replaced by E trains from the Queens Boulevard Line. In 1937, the connection to the IND Crosstown Line opened and GG (later renamed the G) trains were extended to Church Avenue, complementing the E. In December 1940, after the IND Sixth Avenue Line opened, E trains were replaced by the F, and the GG was cut back to Smith–Ninth Streets. Following the completion of the Culver Ramp in 1954, D Concourse Express trains replaced F service to Coney Island. In November 1967, the Chrystie Street Connection opened and D trains were rerouted via the Manhattan Bridge and the BMT Brighton Line to Coney Island. F trains were extended once again via the Culver Line.

The center tracks at the station were used for F express service starting in June 1968, while G trains were extended from Smith–Ninth Streets to Church Avenue to provide local service. Express service between Bergen and Church ended in 1976 due to budgetary concerns and passenger complaints, and the GG, later renamed the G, was again terminated at the Smith–Ninth Streets station.

In July 2009, the G was again extended from its terminus at Smith–Ninth Streets to a more efficient terminus at Church Avenue to accommodate the rehabilitation of the Culver Viaduct. The G extension was made permanent in July 2012. In July 2019, the MTA revealed plans to restore express service on the Culver Line between Jay Street and Church Avenue. Express service started on September 16, 2019.

=== Incidents ===
Jack Lovelock, a 1936 Olympic gold medalist from New Zealand, fell onto the tracks at the Church Avenue station on December 28, 1949, after complaining to his wife about dizziness; he was then killed by an oncoming train. On August 2, 1974, a robbery suspect was killed by a plainclothes police officer in the station. The former was suspected to have robbed a token booth in the station shortly beforehand.

== Station layout ==
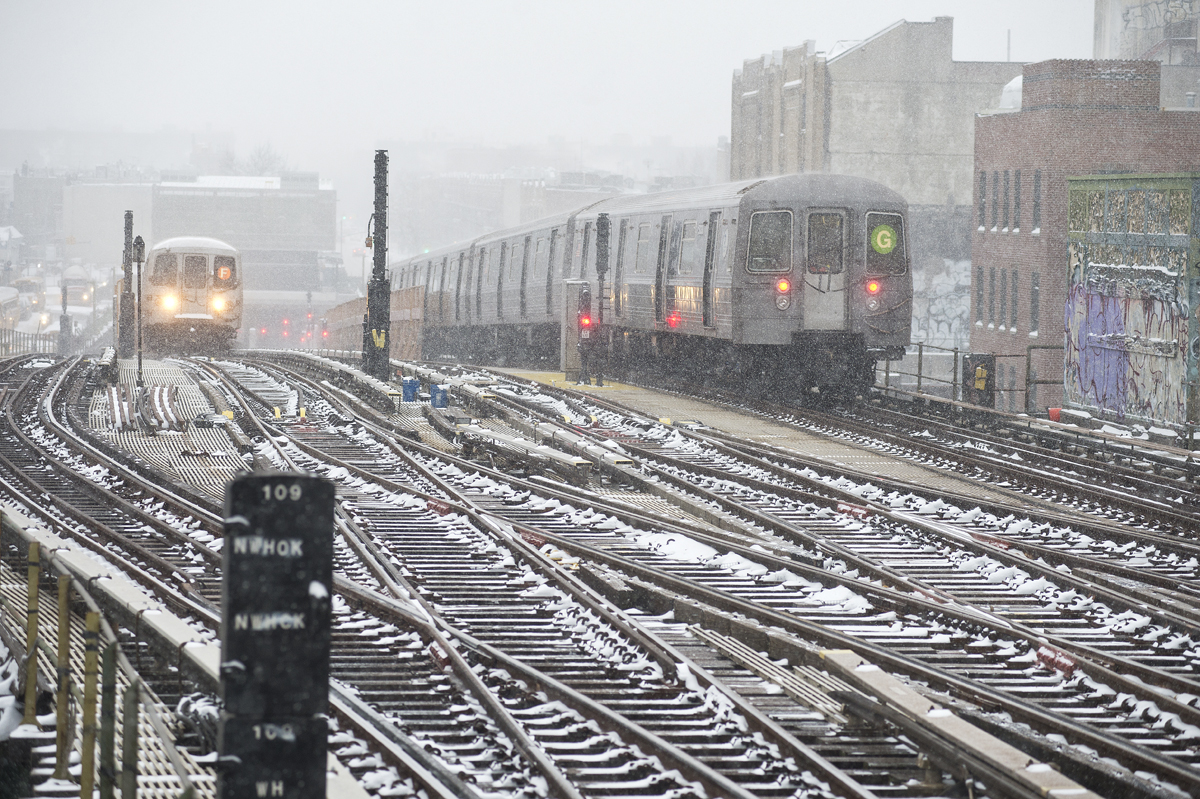
The Culver Ramp south of the station

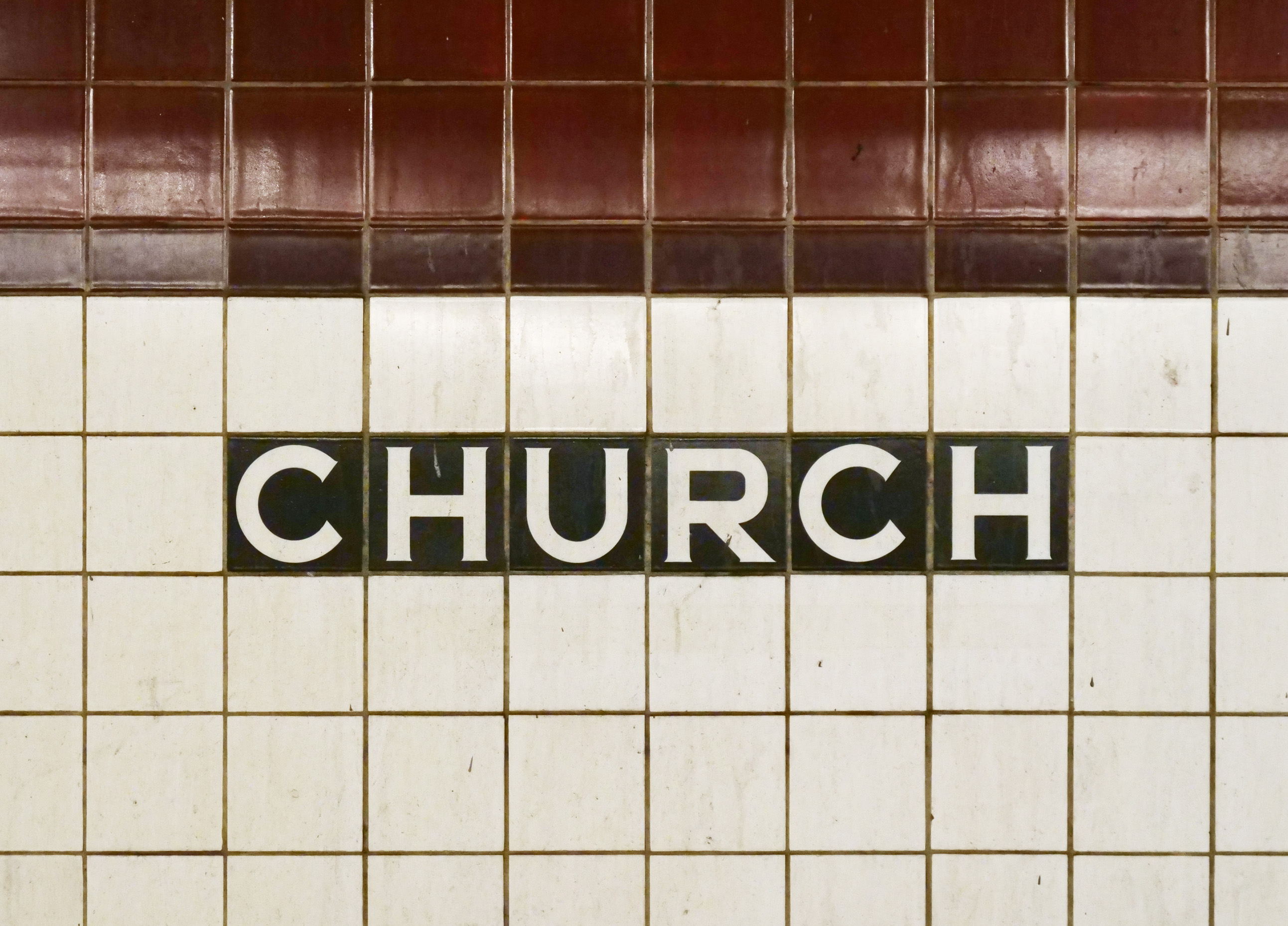
Tile caption below trim line

This underground station, located in Kensington, has four tracks and two island platforms. Both outer track walls have a maroon trim line with a Tuscan red border and small tile captions below them reading "CHURCH" in white lettering on a black background. This tile band is set in a two-tile-high course, an arrangement normally seen at local stations. The tiles were part of a color-coded tile system used throughout the IND. The tile colors were designed to facilitate navigation for travelers going away from Lower Manhattan. Because Church Avenue was an express station, it uses a different tile color from the next station to the north, Fort Hamilton Parkway. All I-beam columns in the station are colored Hunter green. The station signs are in the standard black name plates with white lettering.

There is a four-track train storage yard known as Church Avenue Yard south of the station beneath the revenue tracks, which is used by terminating G trains. South of the connection to the yard, there are switches between the express and local tracks, south of the yard ramps. These switches replace the same ones that were located immediately north of the Ditmas Avenue station. The switches were relocated underground to protect the switches from weather, increasing their reliability and eliminating a potential failure point. The line then ramps up to become a three-track elevated line before entering the Ditmas Avenue station; the two express tracks merge into a single track. Though this station is a part of the IND Division, the Culver elevated portion directly to the south of this station is controlled by BMT radio dispatch and supervision, so train operators change between the IND (B-2) and BMT (B-1) radio frequencies at this point or station.

During off-peak hours, the express tracks can be used for staging subway cars without interfering with normal service.

=== Exits ===
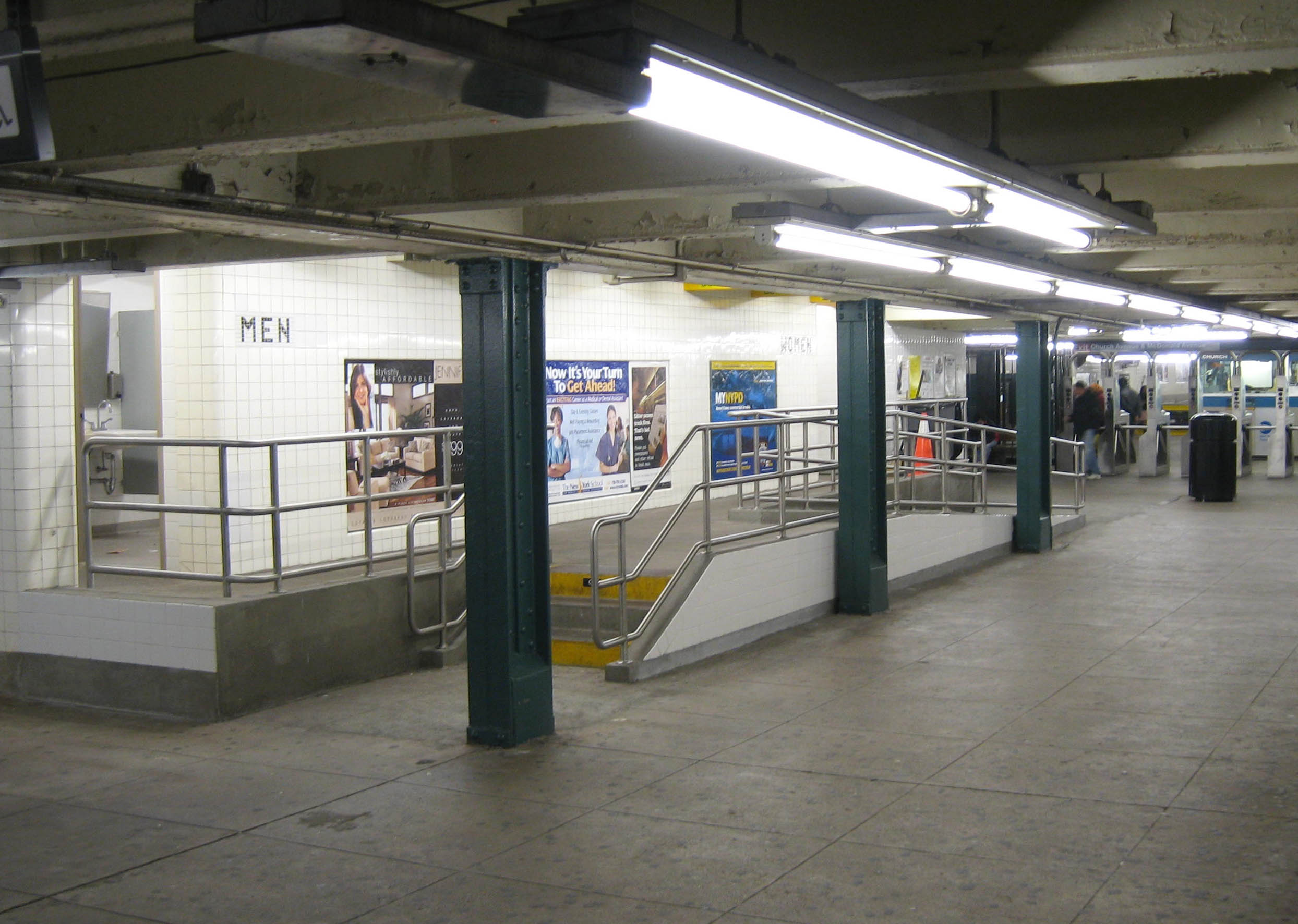
Restrooms on the southern mezzanine

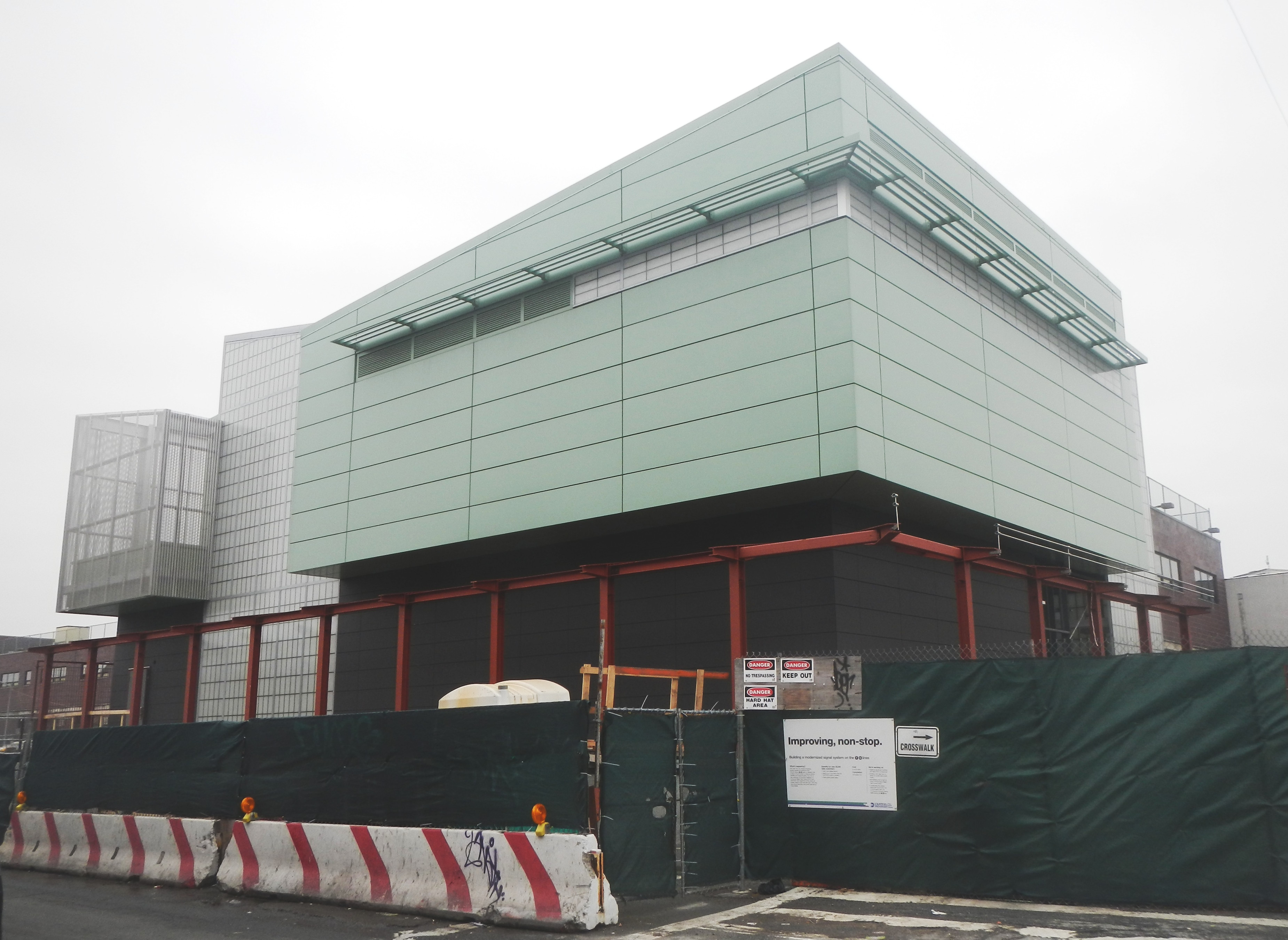
Signal house outside the Church Avenue station

This station has a full-length mezzanine above the platforms and tracks with two fare control areas. The full-time one is at the extreme south end. Two staircases and one elevator from each platform go up to the mezzanine, where public restrooms at the center are available and a turnstile bank provides entrance/exit to/from the station. Outside fare control, there is a token booth and staircases going up to all four corners of Church and McDonald Avenues. There is also a ramp leading to an elevator that goes up to the west side of Church Avenue. The three elevators, installed during a 2008 renovation, make the station ADA accessible.

The station's other fare control area at the north end is un-staffed. Three staircases from each platform go up to a mezzanine, where exit-only and High Entry/Exit Turnstiles provide entrance/exit to/from the station. Outside fare control, there are two staircases facing in different directions that go up to either southern corners of Albemarle Road and McDonald Avenues. Crew facilities at the center of the mezzanine separate the two fare control areas.
