= Peter G. Van Alst =

American Surveyor, Engineer and commissioner

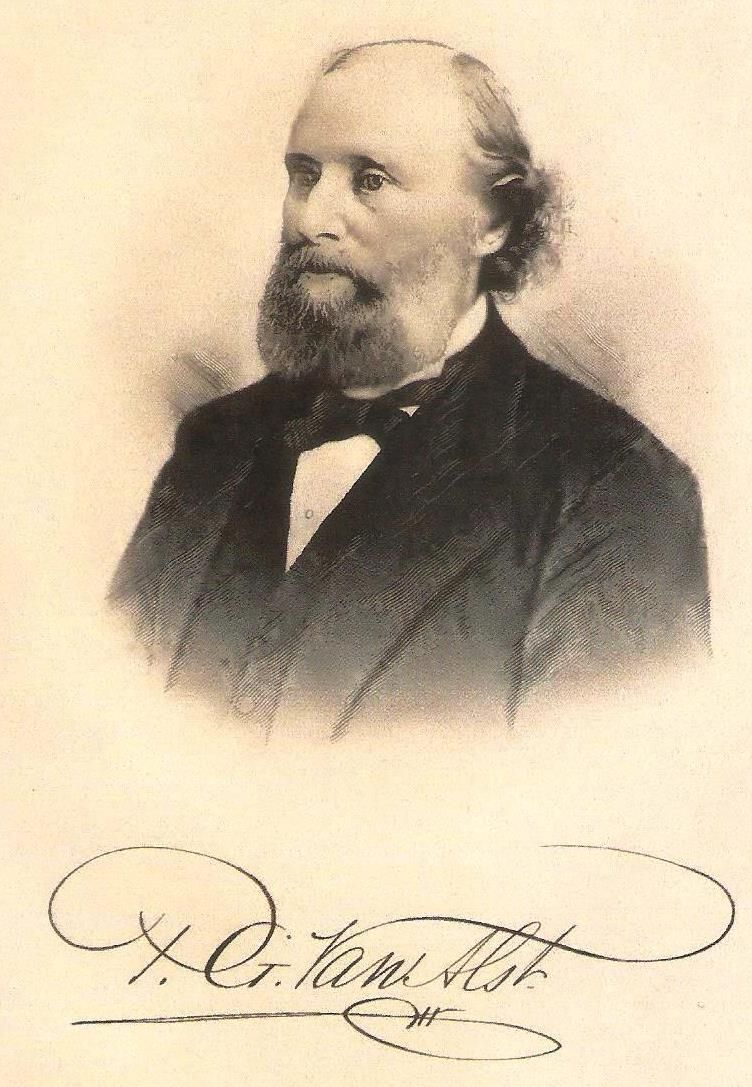
- Born: May 28, 1828; Dutch Kills, Queens, New York, US
- Died: October 15, 1900 (age 72); Astoria, New York, US
- Education: Astoria Institute
- Occupations: City Surveyor; Long Island City Improvement Commissioner; General Engineer of the Long Island City Improvement Company
- Years active: 1845–1900
- Employer: H.F. Betts
- Known for: Surveying and public service
- Notable work: Cadastral Map of Long Island City; 1863 survey of Belleplain

Peter G. Van Alst (28 May 1828 – 15 October 1900) was a prominent American surveyor and civic leader recognized for his significant contributions to the development of western Queens, New York, particularly in Long Island City and Astoria.

== Early life and background ==
Peter G. Van Alst was born on May 28, 1828, in Dutch Kills, Queens, into a well-known Dutch farming family that had settled in the area in the early 1700s. He received his education at the District School and the Astoria Institute, later apprenticing as a surveyor before establishing his own practice.

== Career ==
Van Alst became a key figure in the urban development of Long Island City. Van Alst apprenticed as a surveyor before working independently until 1872, when he was appointed by the city legislature as a commissioner.

=== Apprenticeship ===
Van Alst began studying and practicing surveying in 1845 under H.F. Betts. of Williamsburg. Upon Betts's death, around 1853, he acquired Betts's office and equipment. He briefly partnered with I.V. Mestole before continuing his business independently

=== Surveyor ===
while serving as city surveyor, he created the first official cadastral map of Long Island City. This map detailed property boundaries, block and lot numbers, landowners' names, canals, and railroads, documenting the city's layout during a period of rapid growth. The map is preserved in the Brooklyn Historical Society's digital collections and remains a foundational document for the area's history.

He was referenced as a surveyor in legal documents, such as an 1872 Brooklyn County Supreme Court case involving land in Kings County, where his 1863 survey of Belleplain was cited as an authoritative source for property boundaries.

=== Commissioner ===
In 1874, Van Alst was appointed by the city legislature as a commissioner, overseeing the construction and surveying of roads in Long Island City. Two years later, he and three other citizens formed the First Ward Improvement Commission, tasked with major public works projects, including raising the grade of Jackson Avenue and overseeing sewer construction. Van Alst's maps were critical for organizing street lines, grades, sewage systems, exact surveying of the Long Island Rail Road line and profoundly influencing the city's development.

== Public service and community involvement ==
Van Alst was active in civic life. He spoke at political events, such as a major, 1880, presidential campaign meeting for the Hancock and English Club, in Long Island City's Third Ward., where he addressed local residents alongside other prominent figures

He also played a key role as a commissioner overseeing public contracts for infrastructure improvements, such as sewer and street construction in Long Island City's First Ward

Van Alst was repeatedly appointed by the Legislature as a commissioner to oversee and supervise the construction of major highways in Long Island City, often serving as chairman. He produced important surveys and maps detailing street lines, grades, sewerage, and ward assessments. In 1893, he became a commissioner for the improvement of Vernon and Jackson avenues and the Boulevard. By January 1896, he was appointed general engineer by the Improvement Company, a position he continued to hold.

== Selected works and recognition ==
- Map of Long Island City (late 1860s): The first official cadastral map of the city, preserved by the Brooklyn Historical Society.
- Map of property in the Second Ward of Long Island City, Queens County, NY.
- Survey of Belleplain (1863): Referenced in legal proceedings as an authoritative land survey.

== Legacy ==
Peter Van Alst's lasting impact on the community has been memorialized by naming several landmarks and public institutions after him.

- Van Alst Avenue (now 21st Street) in Astoria, NY.
- The 21st Street - Van Alst station on the IND train line at the intersection of 21st Street and Jackson ave in Hunter's Point, NY.
- P.S. 171 Peter G. Van Alst, a public elementary school in Astoria, NY.
- Van Alst Playground in Astoria, NY.

== Personal life and death ==
On July 4, 1867, Van Alst married Eliza Johnson. They had three children. He died on October 15, 1900.
