= Manhattan Avenue =

Manhattan Avenue may refer to:

- Manhattan Avenue (Brooklyn), in Williamsburg and Greenpoint, New York
- Manhattan Avenue (Manhattan), in Harlem and the Upper West Side, New York
