= Manhattan Avenue (Brooklyn) =

Avenue in Brooklyn, New York

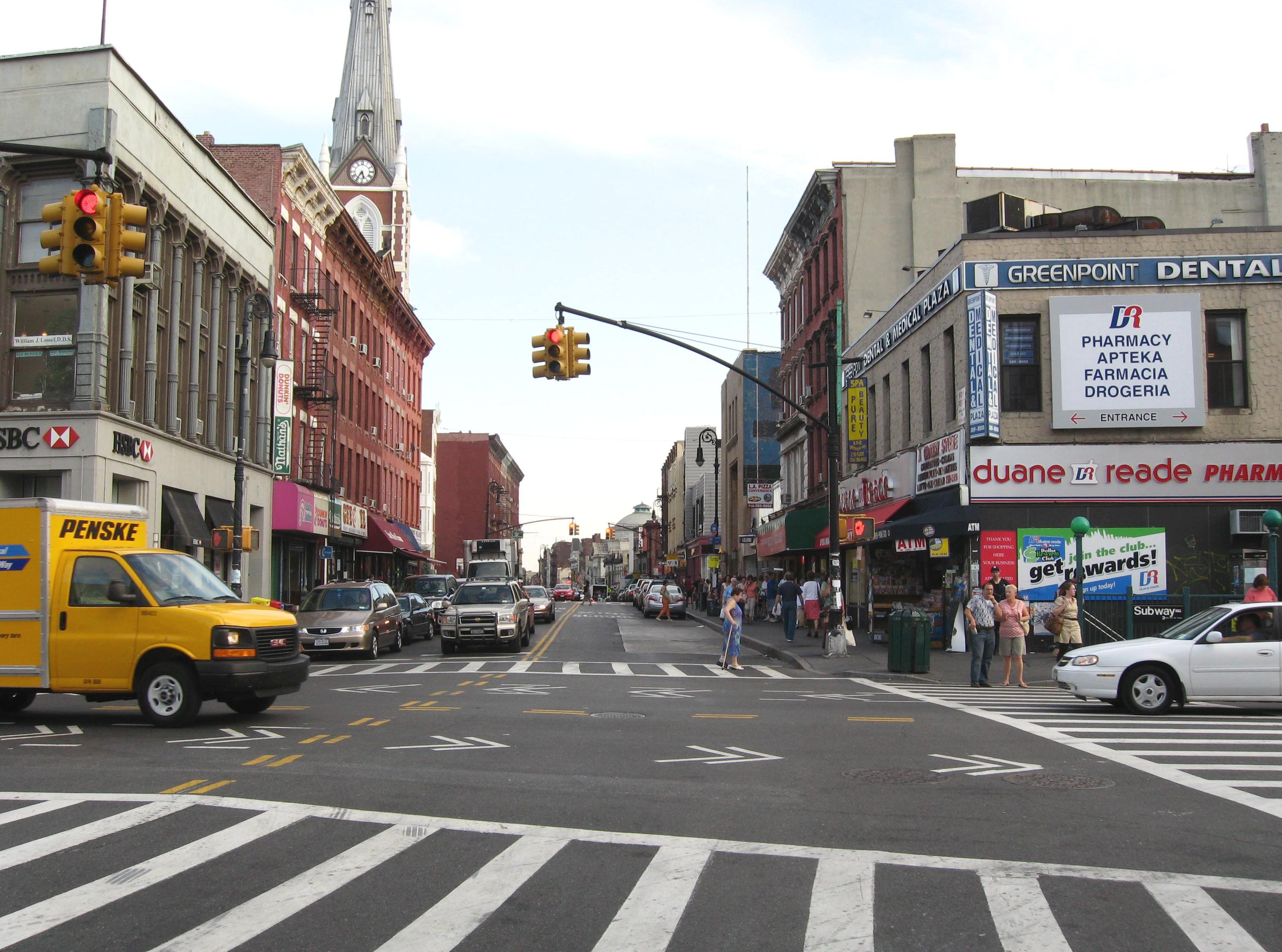
Manhattan Avenue, Brooklyn

Manhattan Avenue is a north-south thoroughfare in the neighborhoods of Greenpoint and Williamsburg in Brooklyn, New York City. It is the major shopping street in Greenpoint while it is mostly residential in Williamsburg. The stretch through Greenpoint is also called Little Poland for its high concentration of Polish culture and of Polish-named businesses and signage. The northern end was formerly connected to Long Island City, Queens by the Vernon Boulevard Bridge across Newtown Creek and the southern end is at Broadway. The southern part of the avenue is one-way northbound while the portion in Greenpoint is bidirectional. The IND Crosstown Line of the New York City Subway (G train) runs under Manhattan Avenue north of McCarren Park, and has two stations, Nassau Avenue and Greenpoint Avenue.

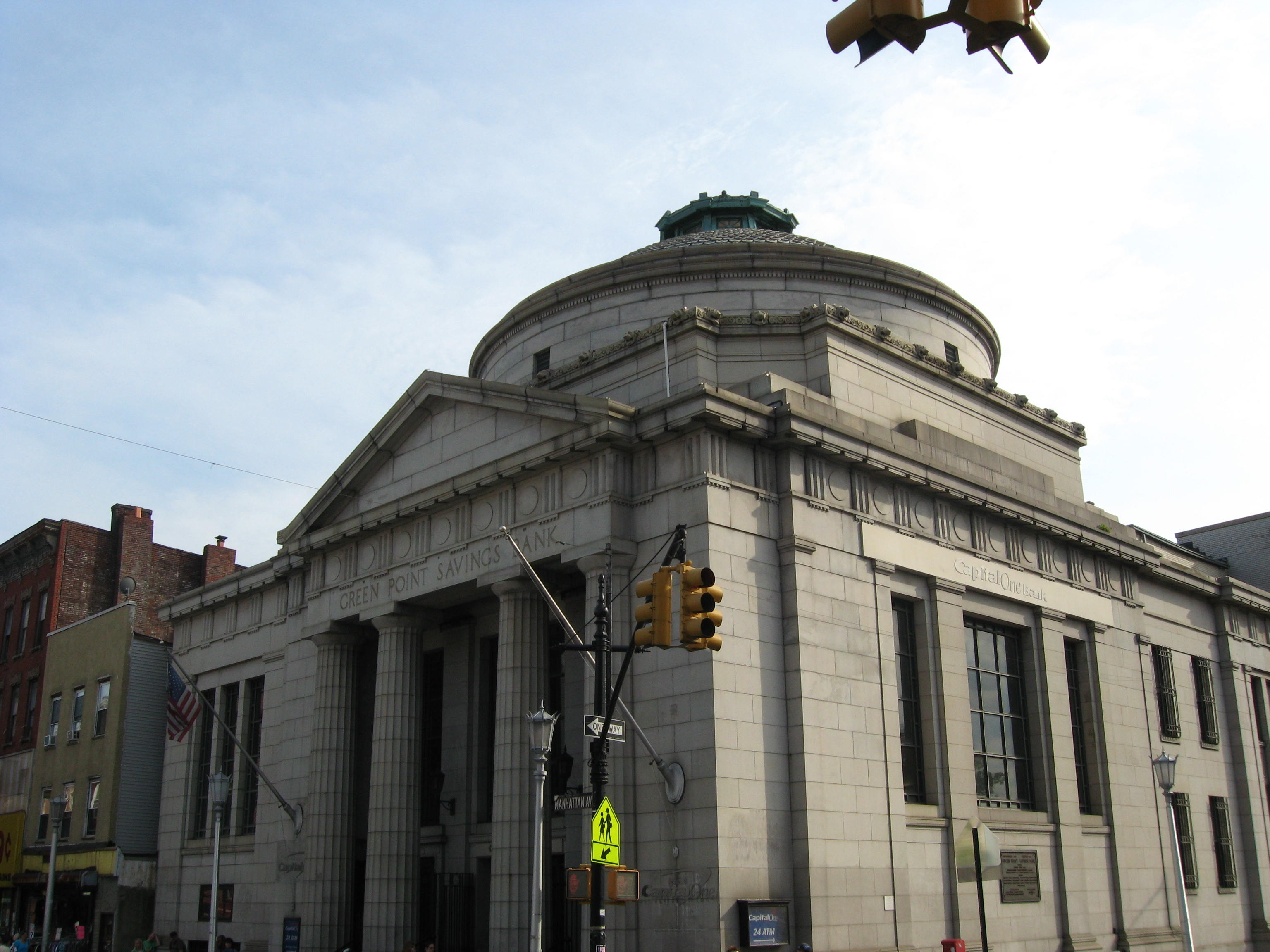
Greenpoint Savings Bank on Manhattan Avenue, Brooklyn

Prior to the consolidation of Williamsburg and Greenpoint into the city of Brooklyn in 1855, what is now Manhattan Ave. existed in two unconnected segments. The segment in Williamsburg was called Ewen Street (signs can still be seen in the masonry of some buildings) and the segment in Greenpoint was named Orchard Street below Greenpoint Avenue and Union Avenue above. These were connected near McCarren Park and renamed Manhattan Ave. This was just one of several street name changes made in an attempt to better integrate the street systems of the different cities and towns after the merger.

== Transportation ==
The G train runs under Manhattan Avenue, with two stations at Nassau Avenue and Greenpoint Avenue.

The following bus routes serve the corridor:

- The B43 serves Manhattan Avenue north of Driggs Avenue (Greenpoint), and from Box Street to Engert Avenue (Prospect Park).
- The B62 serves it from Freeman Street to Driggs Avenue (Fulton Mall), and from Nassau Avenue to Green Street (Queens Plaza).
- The Prospect Park-bound B48 runs from Nassau Avenue to Driggs Avenue.
