= Greenpoint Avenue station =

New York City Subway station in Brooklyn

Greenpoint Avenue
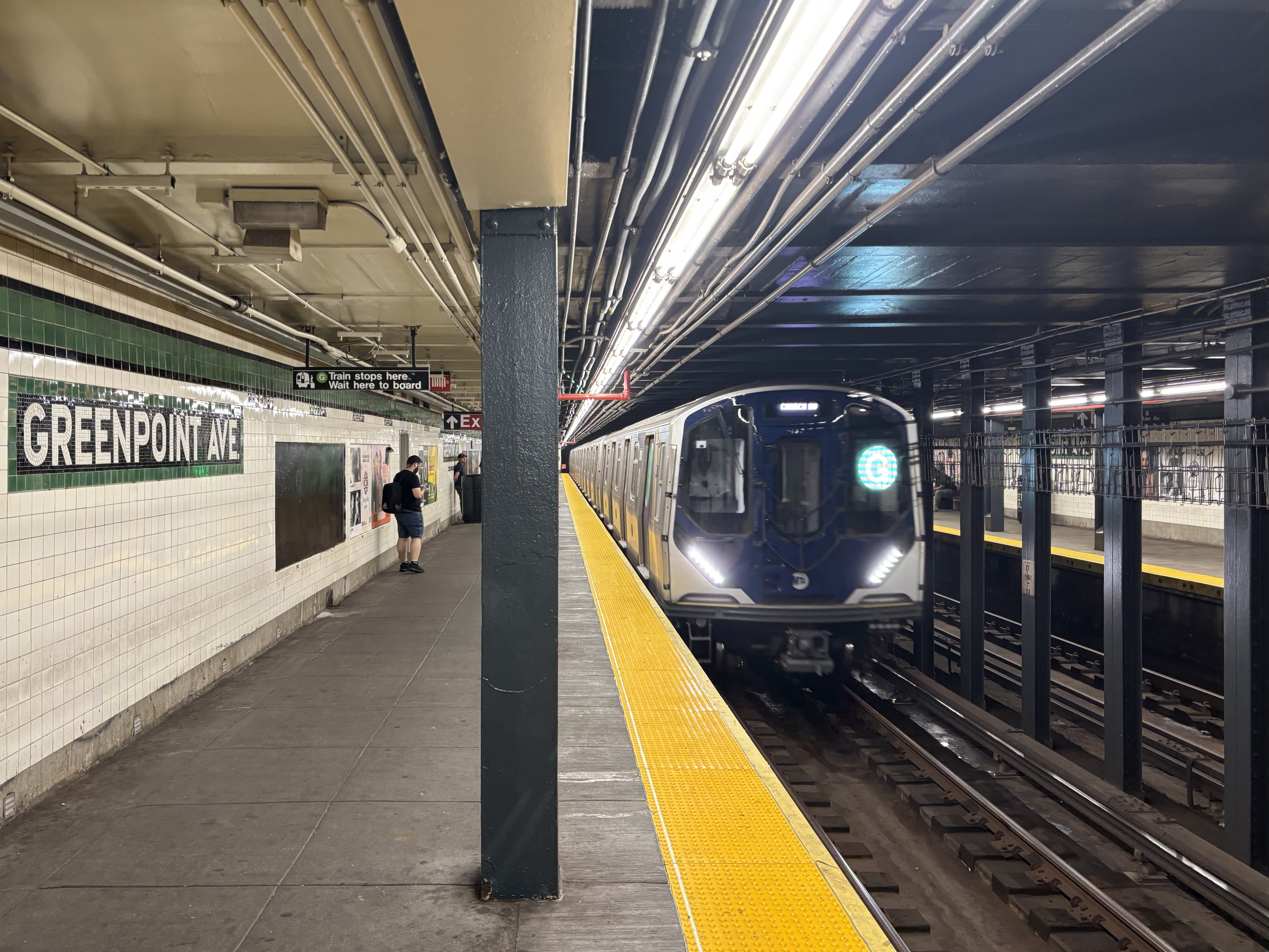
- R211A G train arriving at the southbound platform

Station statistics
- Address: Greenpoint Avenue & Manhattan Avenue; Brooklyn, New York
- Borough: Brooklyn
- Locale: Greenpoint
- Coordinates: 40.730153°N 73.954296°W
- Division: B (IND)
- Line: IND Crosstown Line
- Services: G (all times)
- Transit: NYCT Bus: B24, B32, B43, B62; NYC Ferry: East River (at Greenpoint Landing)
- Structure: Underground
- Platforms: 2 side platforms
- Tracks: 2

Other information
- Opened: August 19, 1933; 93 years ago
- Accessible: Yes

Traffic
- 2025: 2,784,330 ▲21.5%
- Rank: 137 out of 423
Services
Preceding station	New York City Subway	Following station
21st Street toward Court Square	G (New York City Subway service)	Nassau Avenue toward Church Avenue
Location
Location within New York City Subway
Location within New York City
Location within New York
Track layout
Street map
Station service legend
Symbol	Description
Stops all times	Stops all times

The Greenpoint Avenue station is a station on the IND Crosstown Line of the New York City Subway. Located at the intersection of Greenpoint and Manhattan Avenues in Greenpoint, Brooklyn, it is served by the G train at all times.

== History ==
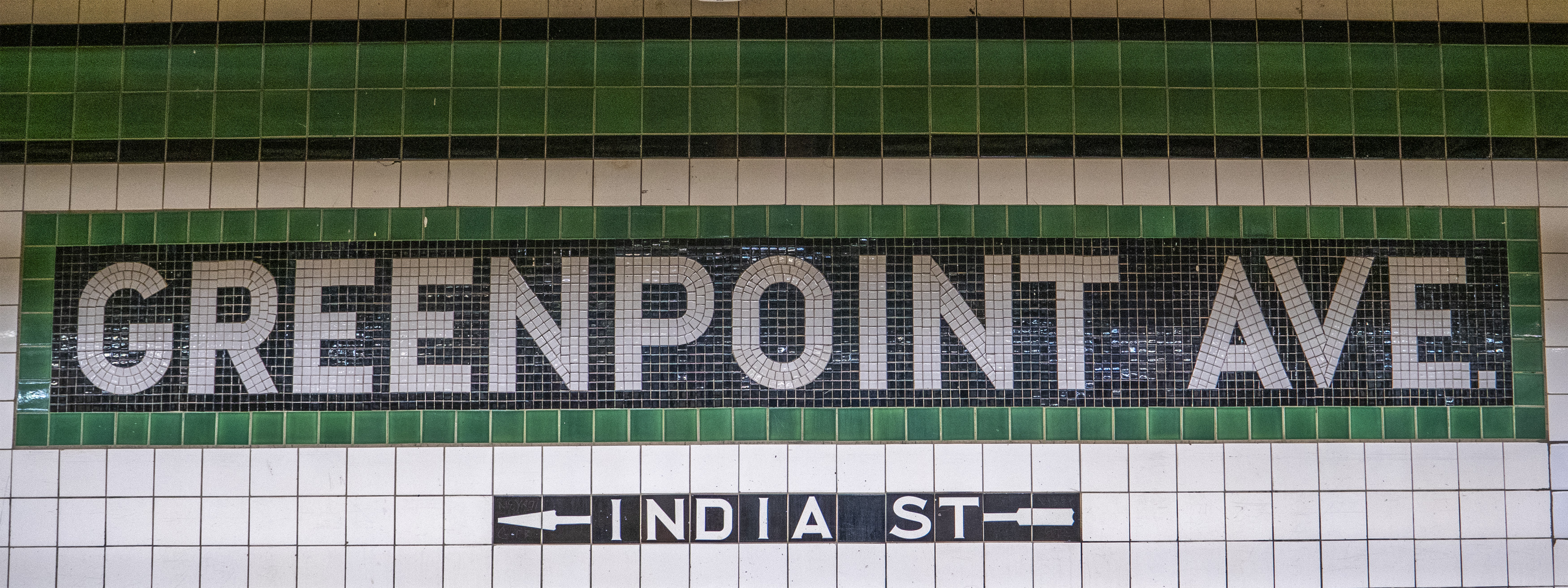
Mosaic name tablet

Greenpoint Avenue opened as part of the first phase of the IND Crosstown Line, with service south to Nassau Avenue in Brooklyn. This station opened on August 19, 1933.

As part of the 2015–2019 Metropolitan Transportation Authority Capital Program, elevators were added to the platforms and street, which makes the station fully compliant with accessibility guidelines under the Americans with Disabilities Act of 1990. Construction started in September 2018 and was expected to be completed by December 2020, but opened a few days earlier in late November 2020. There are three elevators: one from the mezzanine to street level on the eastern side of Manhattan Avenue north of Greenpoint Avenue, and one to each platform. The project was expected to cost $23.4 million. The MTA announced in April 2024 that it would make aesthetic improvements to the station during mid-2024 as part of its Re-New-Vation program. This station received minor improvements such as repainting of pillars to a black colour, deep cleaning of the station, repainting of benches, incorporating brighter lighting, and other improvements while the line was temporarily closed for construction.

== Station layout ==
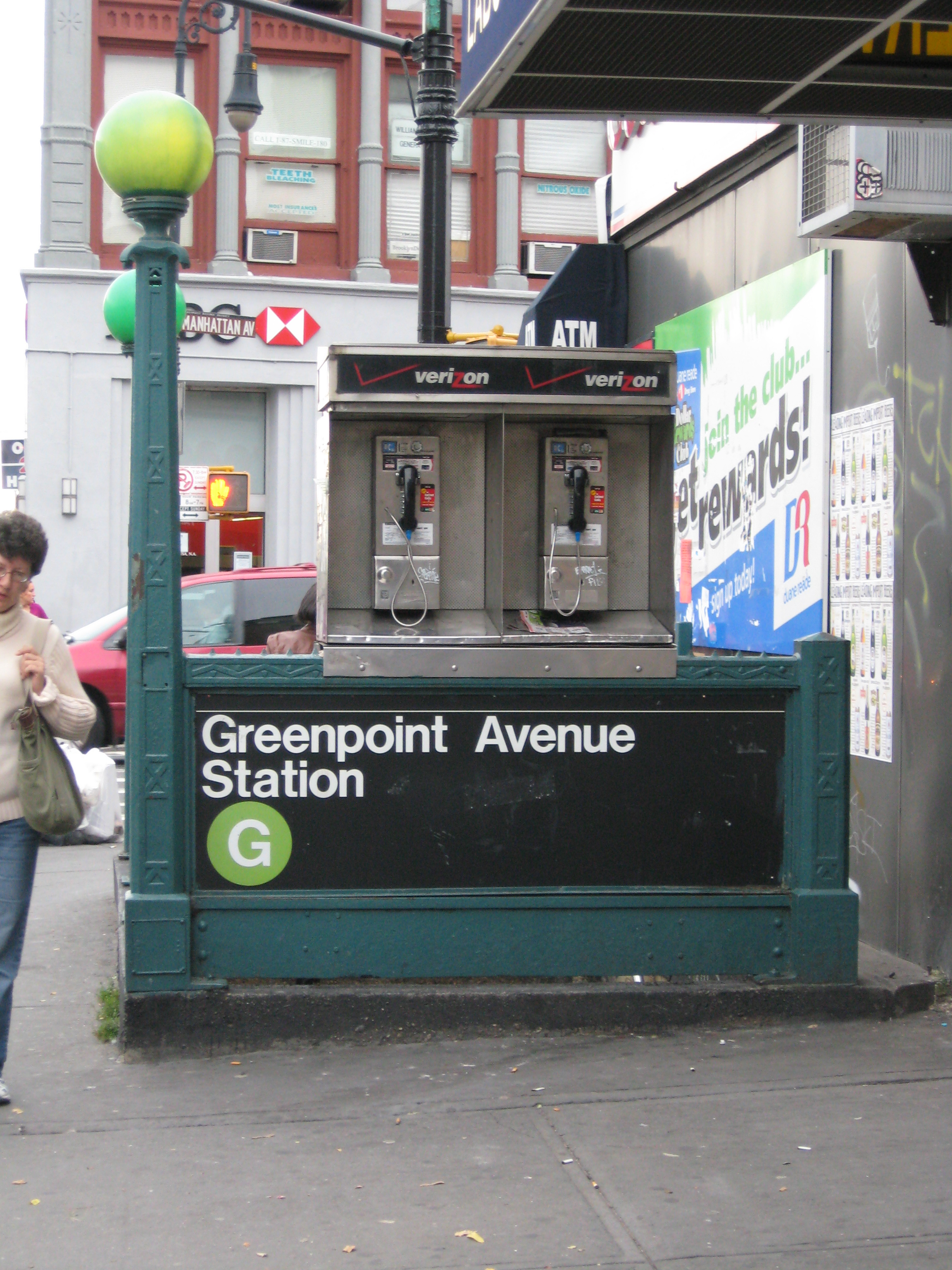
Station stairs

This underground station has two tracks and two side platforms. The G stops at the station at all times. The station is between 21st Street to the north and Nassau Avenue to the south.

Both platforms have a green trim line with a black border and mosaic name tablets reading "GREENPOINT AVE." in white sans-serif font on a black background and green border. Directly below the trim line are tile name captions reading "GREENPT" in white lettering on a black background. Directional tile signs are below some of the name tablets. The tiles were part of a color-coded tile system used throughout the IND. The tile colors were designed to facilitate navigation for travelers going away from Lower Manhattan. Because the Crosstown Line does not merge into a line that enters Manhattan at either end, all stations on the line had green tiles. Green I-beam columns run along both platforms at regular intervals, alternating ones having the standard black name plate in white lettering.

This is the northernmost station on the IND Crosstown Line in Brooklyn. To the north, the line goes under Newtown Creek into Long Island City, Queens.

=== Exits ===
The station's full-time entrance/exit is at the south end, which is the more heavily used of the station's two entry-exit points. The large mezzanine above the platforms and tracks has three staircases to each side with directional mosaics reading "Brooklyn" and "L. I. City and Jamaica" and green columns. Outside the turnstile bank, there is a token booth and three staircases going up to all corners of Manhattan and Greenpoint Avenues except the northeast one. G trains, which are about half the length of the 600-foot (180 m) platform, stop near the south end of the station.

Both platforms have an unstaffed, same-level fare control area at their north ends. Each side has one exit-only turnstile, two High Entry/Exit Turnstiles, and one staircase going up to the south side of India Street and Manhattan Avenue. The one on the Queens-bound side goes up to the southeast corner while the one on the Church Avenue-bound side goes up to the southwest corner.
