= 21st Street station (IND Crosstown Line) =

New York City Subway station in Queens

21 Street
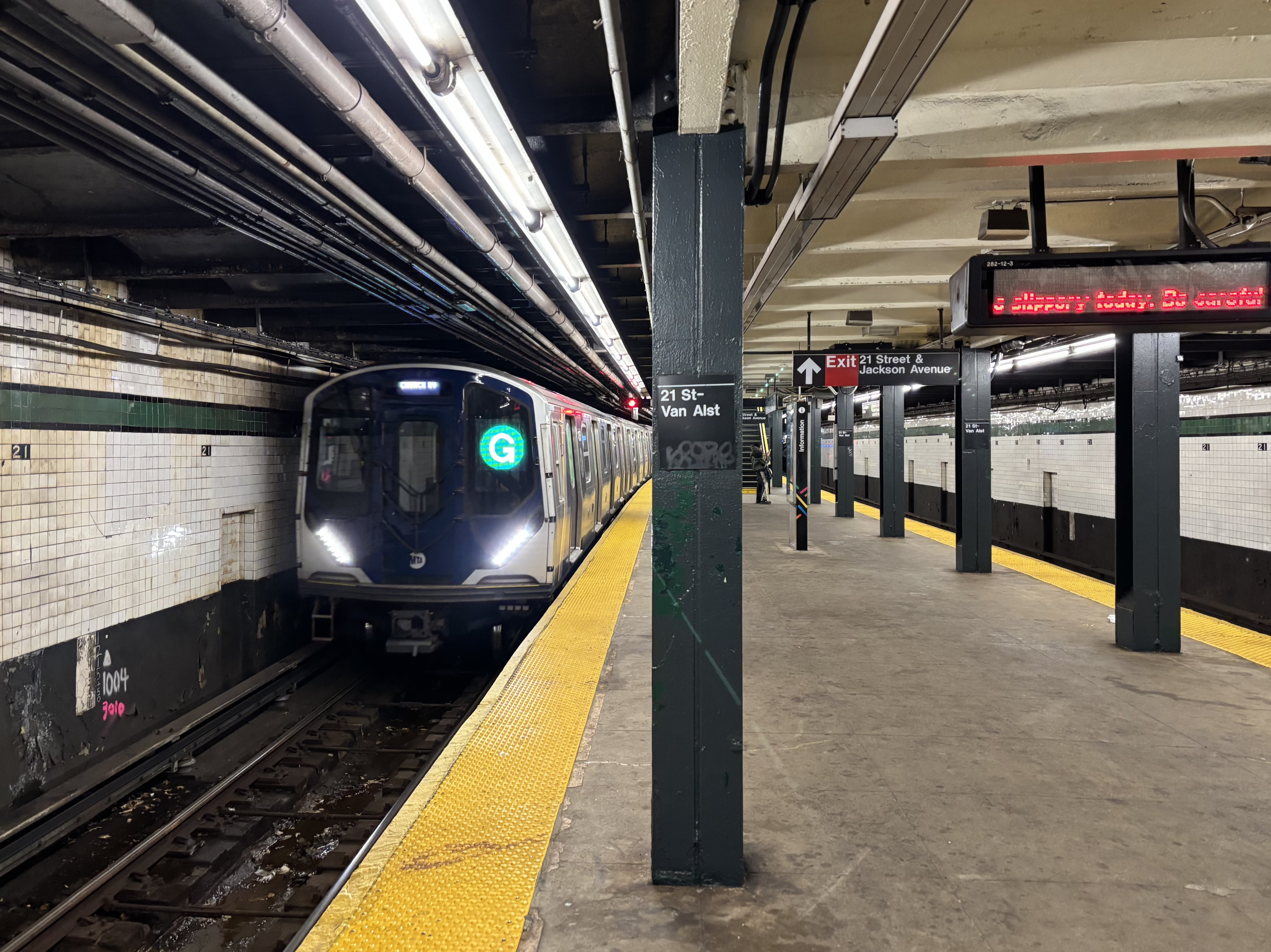
- Southbound R211T G train arriving

Station statistics
- Address: 21st Street & Jackson Avenue; Queens, New York
- Borough: Queens
- Locale: Long Island City
- Coordinates: 40.744591°N 73.948674°W
- Division: B (IND)
- Line: IND Crosstown Line
- Services: G (all times)
- Transit: NYCT Bus: B32, B62, Q67 MTA Bus: Q101, Q103; LIRR Hunterspoint Avenue station
- Structure: Underground
- Platforms: 1 island platform
- Tracks: 2

Other information
- Opened: August 19, 1933 (93 years ago)

Traffic
- 2025: 488,072 ▲19.9%
- Rank: 398 out of 423
Services
Preceding station	New York City Subway	Following station
Court Square Terminus	G (New York City Subway service)	Greenpoint Avenue toward Church Avenue
Location
Location within New York City Subway
Location within New York City
Location within New York
Track layout
Street map
Station service legend
Symbol	Description
Stops all times	Stops all times

The 21st Street station (signed as 21st Street–Van Alst) is a station on the IND Crosstown Line of the New York City Subway. Located at the intersection of 21st Street and Jackson Avenue in the Hunters Point section of Long Island City, Queens, it is served by the G train at all times.

== History ==
21st Street was part of the first phase of the IND Crosstown Line, with service south to Nassau Avenue in Brooklyn. The site of the station was excavated by April 1929. The station opened on August 19, 1933. The secondary name "Van Alst" refers to Van Alst Avenue, the former name of 21st Street. The patriarch of the Van Alst family was Belgian Dutch sailor Joris Stevensen, who settled in what was then New Amsterdam in 1652, and purchased land in Long Island City in 1670. Stevensen was known as "de Caper van Alst" ("the sailor from Aalst"), leading future members of the family to assume the surname "Van Alst". The family later constructed a private cemetery (now an empty lot at the former site of the West Disinfecting Company facility) on Jackson Avenue and Orchard Street near modern Queens Plaza. The Van Alst name is shared with the Van Alst Playground, on 21st Street and 30th Avenue in Astoria.

== Station layout ==
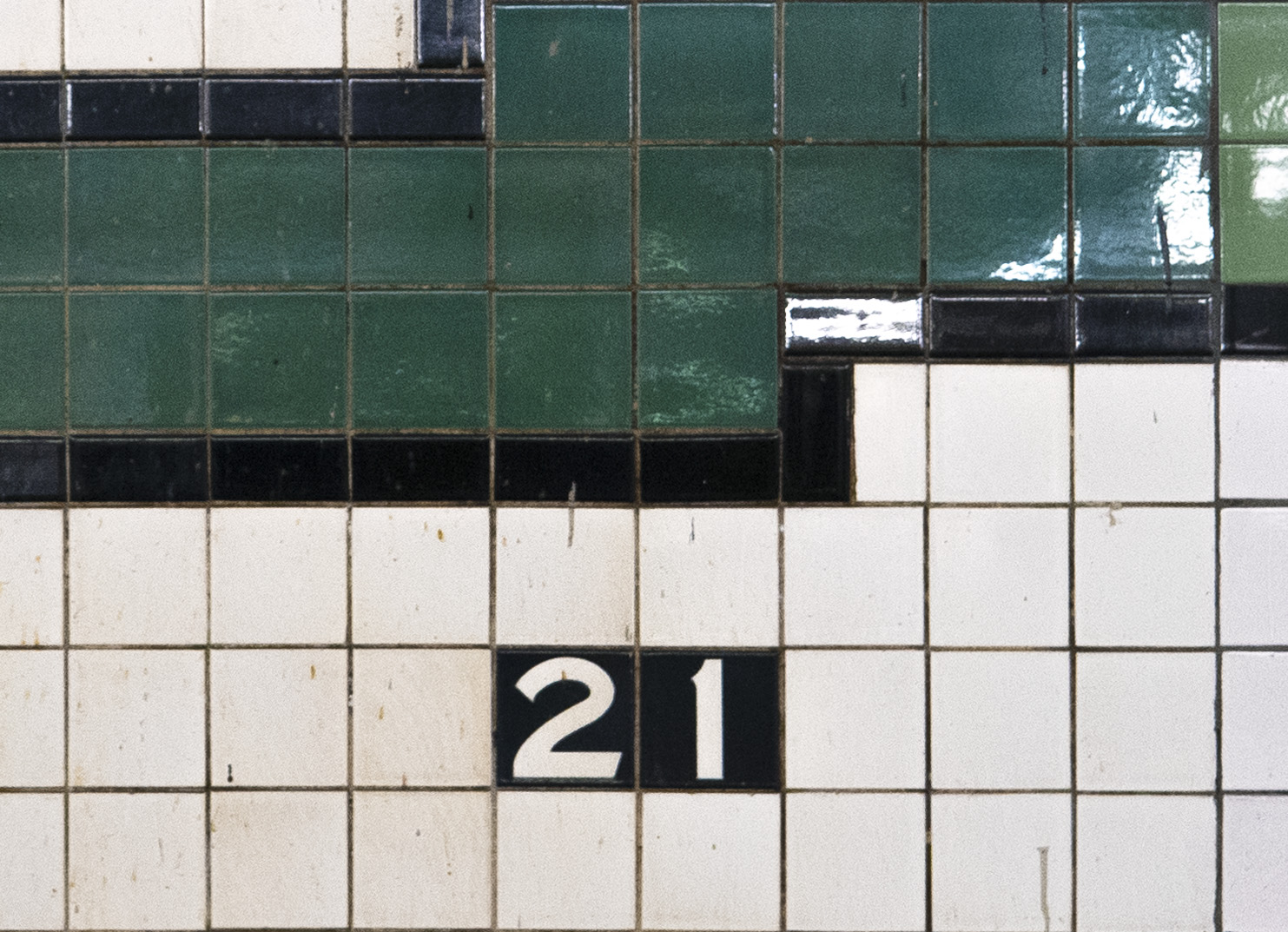
Tile caption below trim line

The station has two tracks and one island platform, built with a slight curve, as is Jackson Avenue at this location. The G stops at the station at all times. The station is between Court Square to the north and Greenpoint Avenue to the south.

The trackside wall trim line is green with a black border and small "21" tile captions run underneath in white numbering on a black background. The tiles were part of a color-coded tile system used throughout the IND. The tile colors were designed to facilitate navigation for travelers going away from Lower Manhattan. Because the Crosstown Line does not merge into a line that enters Manhattan at either end, all stations on the line had green tiles. The platform and mezzanine columns are Hunter green (previously they were violet) with every other platform column having the standard black station name plate with white lettering. A booth for NYPD Transit Police District 20 is located at the southern end of the platform. There is a full-length mezzanine above the platform; however, only the northern half is open and has two staircases from the platform. The southern half had three staircases to the platform and is used for storage and employee offices.

Like many stations on the Crosstown Line, this station is in poor condition as the wall tile has been damaged by underground springs, particularly on the southbound side. Despite this damage, there are no plans to make repairs.

North of this station, a center track briefly forms between the two main tracks of the Crosstown Line. This track allows trains to terminate on either track at Court Square. As a result, there is a train route selection panel at the north end of the northbound track.

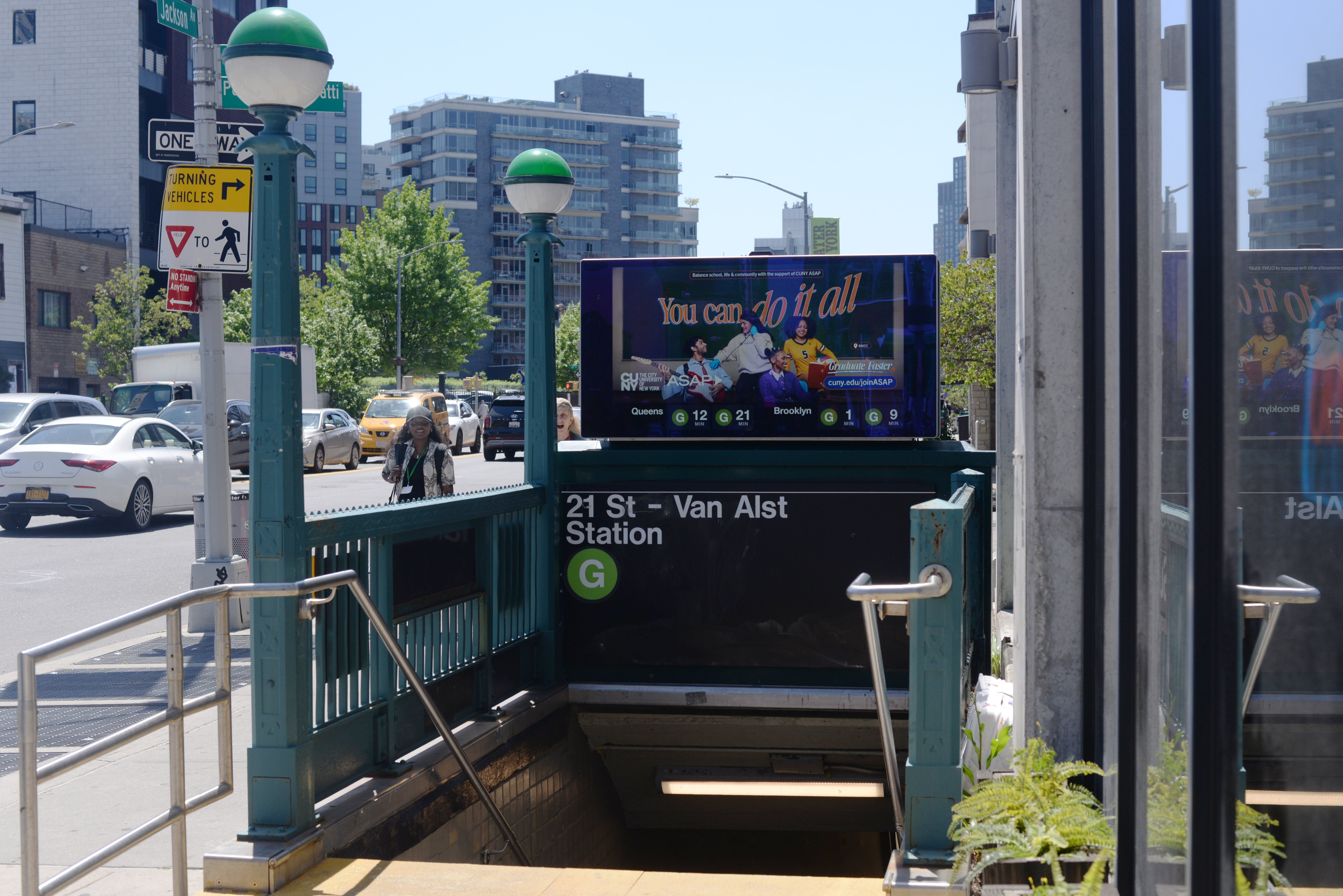
Entrance on Jackson Ave

=== Exits ===
The station's only entrance/exit, from the northern mezzanine, has a turnstile bank, token booth, and three street stairs to the three-way intersection of 21st Street, Jackson Avenue, and 47th Avenue, at the point where New York State Route 25A turns from 21st Street to Jackson Avenue.
