= Court Square–23rd Street station =

New York City Subway station in Queens

Court Square–23 Street
- New York City Subway station complex
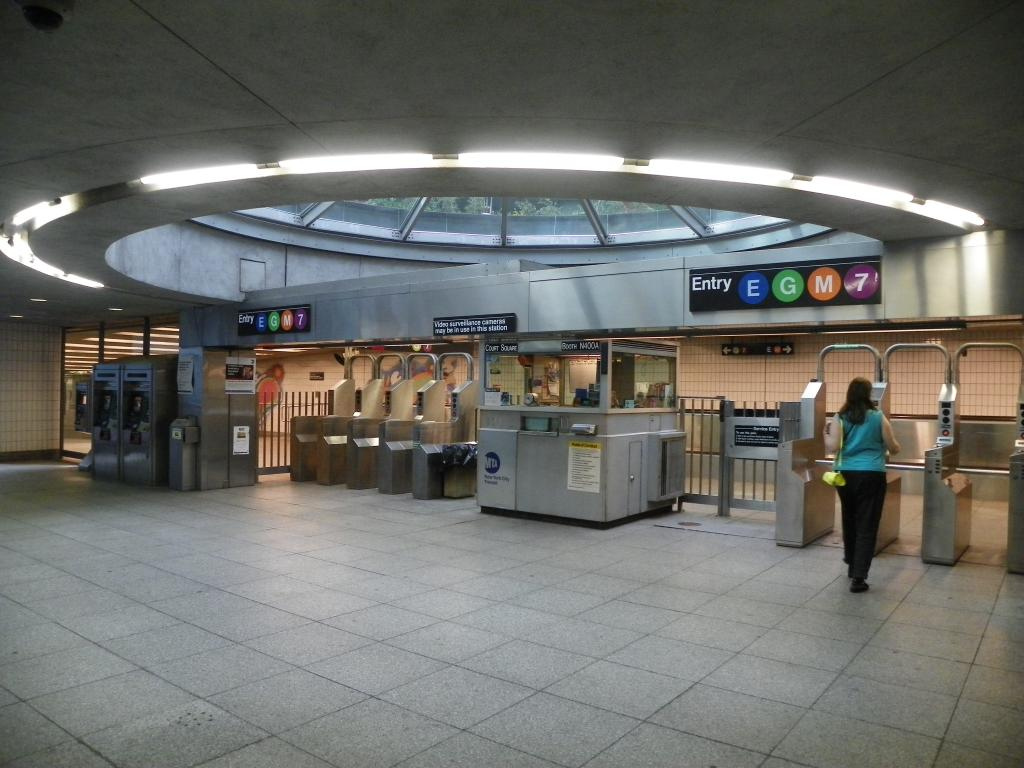
- Main fare control area leading from One Court Square

Station statistics
- Address: the immediate vicinity of One Court Square; Queens, New York
- Borough: Queens
- Locale: Hunters Point, Long Island City
- Coordinates: 40.7476°N 73.9451°W
- Division: A (IRT), B (IND)
- Line: IND Crosstown Line; IRT Flushing Line; IND Queens Boulevard Line
- Services: 7 (all times) <7> (rush hours until 9:30 p.m., peak direction); E (all times); F (weekday) <F> (two rush hour trains, peak direction); G (all times)
- Transit: NYCT Bus: B32, B62, Q67; MTA Bus: Q63, Q101, Q102, Q103
- Levels: 3

Other information
- Opened: 1990 (Queens Boulevard & Crosstown lines); June 3, 2011; 15 years ago (Flushing line)
- Accessible: Partially; full access under construction (all except for eastbound IND Queens Boulevard Line platform)

Traffic
- 2025: 6,364,588 ▲6.2%
- Rank: 40 out of 423
Location
Location within New York City Subway
Location within New York City
Location within New York
Street map
Station service legend
Symbol	Description
Stops all times	Stops all times
Stops rush hours in the peak direction only	Stops rush hours in the peak direction only
Stops weekdays during the day	Stops weekdays during the day

The Court Square–23rd Street station is a New York City Subway station complex on the IND Crosstown Line, the IRT Flushing Line and the IND Queens Boulevard Line. The complex is located in the vicinity of One Court Square in Hunters Point and Long Island City, Queens. It is served by the 7, E, and G trains at all times (the latter of which terminates here); the F train on weekdays; and the <7> express train in the peak direction, and the <F> train in the reverse peak direction, during rush hours.

The complex comprises three originally separate stations, formerly known as the 23rd Street–Ely Avenue station (Queens Boulevard Line), Long Island City–Court Square station (Crosstown Line), and 45th Road–Court House Square station (Flushing Line). The Flushing Line station was the first to open, in 1916. The Crosstown Line station opened in 1933, followed by the Queens Boulevard Line station in 1939.

Two passageways were built to connect the three stations. The first was built in 1990, following the opening of the Citigroup office tower at One Court Square. In December 2001, this passageway came into greater use when G trains started to terminate at Court Square. A second passageway was completed between the Crosstown and Flushing Line stations in 2011. The Flushing and Crosstown Line stations were renamed "Court Square"; these stations became ADA-accessible in 2011 and 2023, respectively. The Queens Boulevard Line station was renamed "Court Square–23rd Street"; its Manhattan-bound platform became ADA-accessible in 2021, while the Queens-bound platform underwent accessibility renovations starting in 2023.

== History ==
=== IRT Flushing Line station ===
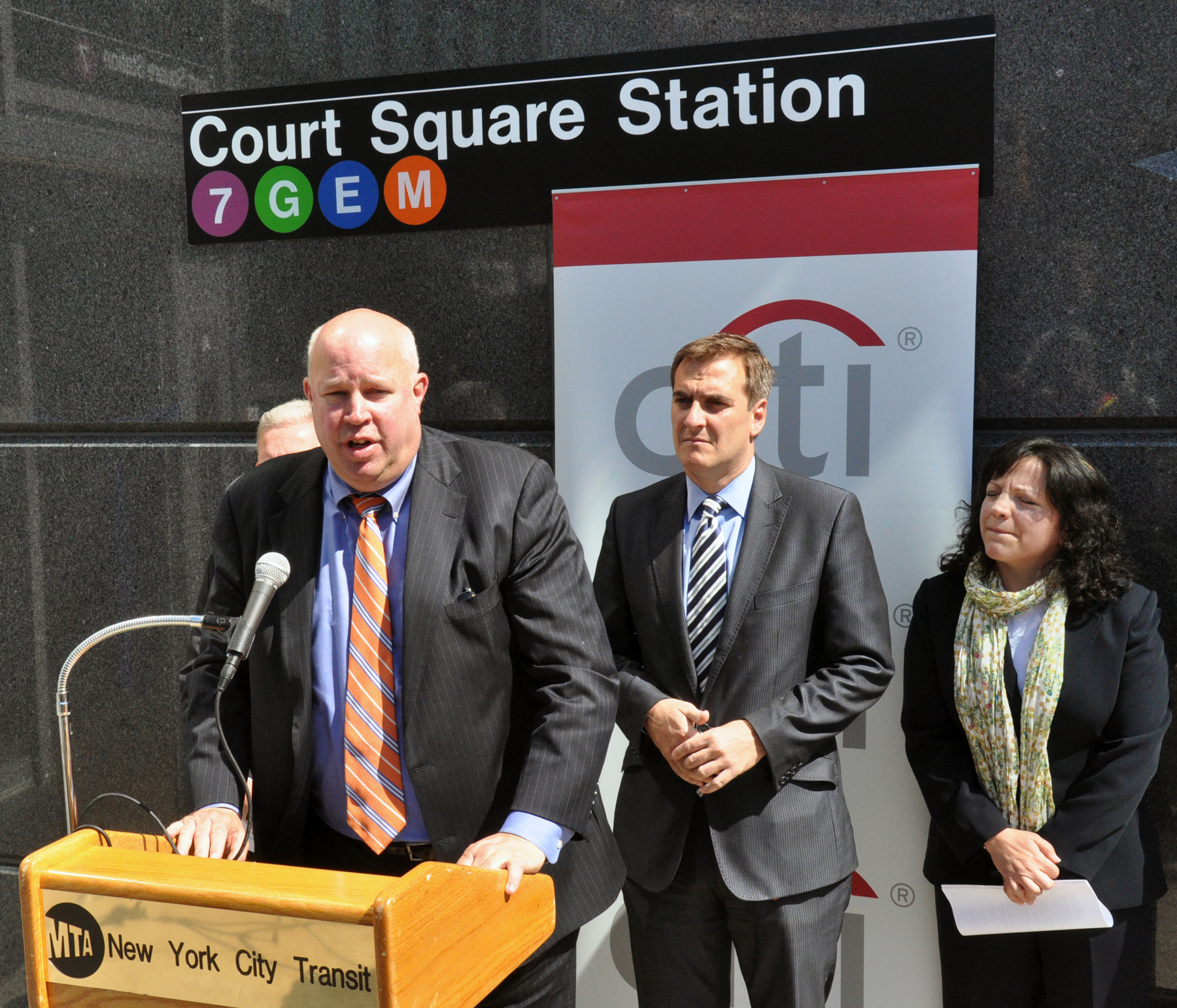
NYCT president Thomas Prendergast at the complex's opening in 2011

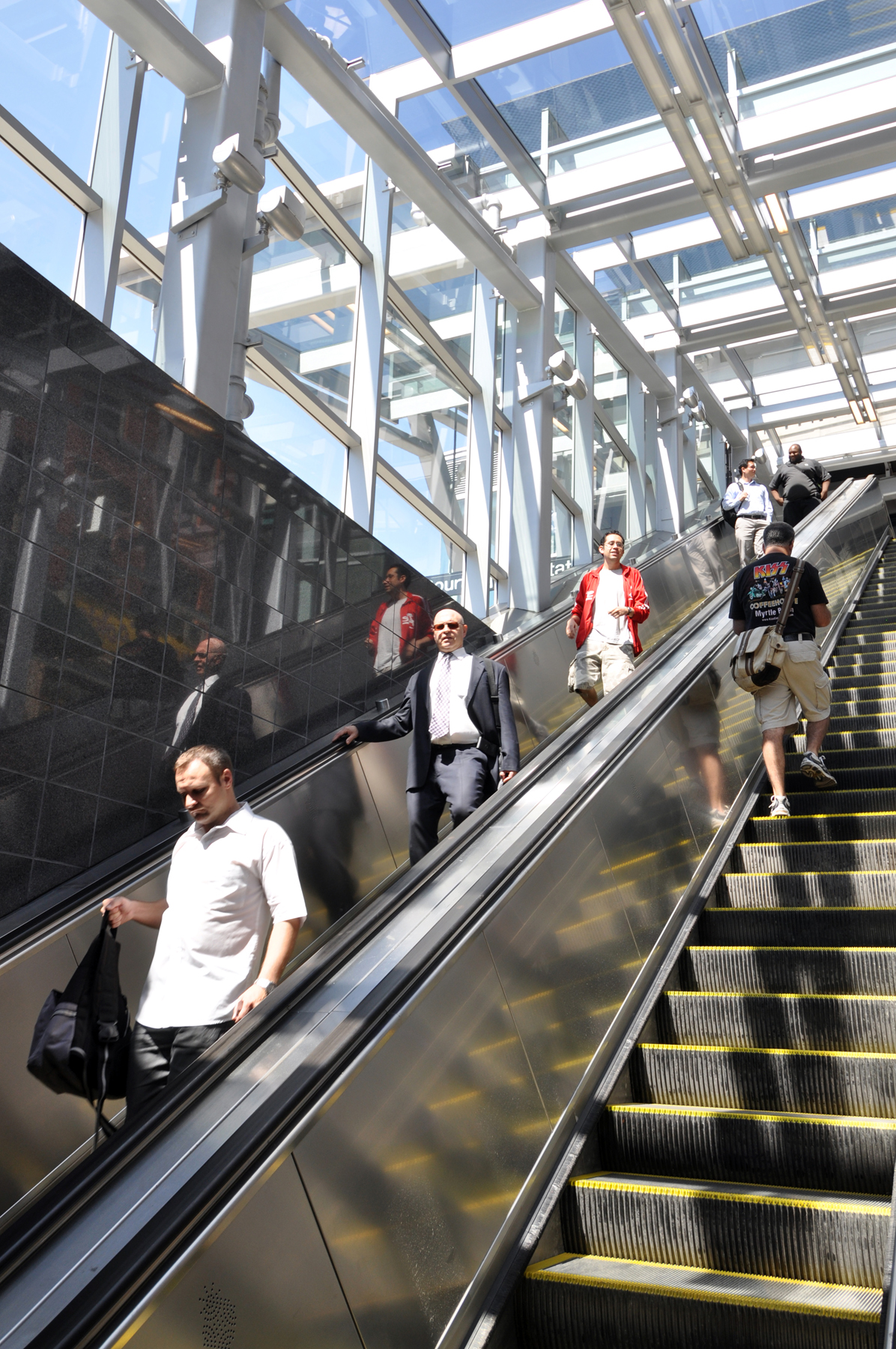
Escalators to the Flushing Line platform

In 1913, the New York City Public Service Commission formalized the Dual Contracts, specifying new lines or expansions to be built by the Interborough Rapid Transit Company (IRT) and the Brooklyn Rapid Transit Company. As part of the Dual Contracts, the IRT was to complete and open the Steinway Tunnel as part of the new Flushing subway line. The tunnel, running under the East River with trolley loops on both the Manhattan and Queens sides, had sat unused since 1907, when test runs had been performed in the then-nearly-complete tunnel. The route was to go from Times Square through the tunnel over to Long Island City and from there continue toward Flushing.

The first part of the future IRT Flushing Line, from Grand Central–42nd Street in Manhattan to Vernon–Jackson Avenues in Long Island City, opened in 1915 and was extended to Hunters Point Avenue in February 1916. The IRT's 45th Road–Court House Square station opened on November 5, 1916, as part of a two-stop extension of the line from Hunters Point Avenue to Queensboro Plaza.

The city government took over the IRT's operations on June 12, 1940. The IRT routes were given numbered designations in 1948 with the introduction of "R-type" rolling stock, which contained rollsigns with numbered designations for each service. The route from Times Square to Flushing became known as the 7. In 1949, the New York City Board of Transportation announced that the Flushing Line platforms would be lengthened to 11 IRT car lengths; the platforms were only able to fit nine 51-foot-long IRT cars beforehand. The platforms at the station were extended in 1955–1956 to accommodate 11-car trains. However, nine-car trains continued to run on the 7 route until 1962, when they were extended to ten cars. In 2005, the station was listed on the National Register of Historic Places.

=== IND stations ===
In the late 1920s and early 1930s, the city-owned Independent Subway System (IND) constructed the first sections of the Crosstown and Queens Boulevard Lines. The Crosstown Line station at Court Square was the first Queens station on either line to be built; its structure was completed in July 1930, and the tilework and equipment were installed afterward. On August 19, 1933, the IND opened the Court Square station as part of the first leg of the IND Crosstown Line. The IND Queens Boulevard Line between Manhattan and Roosevelt Avenue opened that same day, with GG trains (predecessor to today's G service) operating between Queens Plaza and Nassau Avenue in Brooklyn.

The Queens Boulevard Line station, provisionally called "21st Street/Van Alst Avenue," was constructed between 1931 and 1933 along with the original section of the line east to Roosevelt Avenue. Although the station had been completed, it was not opened alongside the rest of the line due to lack of demand perceived by the city Board of Transportation, which called the station a "dead" station. This was in spite of protests from local civic and industry leaders, due to the numerous factories in the surrounding area. By December 1933, the station was referred to as "Ely Avenue", likely to avoid confusion with the nearby station on the Crosstown Line. In September 1936, it was decided to complete the station as an infill station due to expanding commercial and industrial operations in the area, with tilework, staircases, and other equipment installed. The station was finished by 1938, but its opening was delayed once again due to alleged lack of demand, with calls to open the station to serve the Long Island City Courthouse, St. John's Hospital (now the site of One Court Square), and the newly opened Queensbridge Houses.

The Queens Boulevard Line station finally opened as 23rd Street–Ely Avenue on August 28, 1939, six years after the first section of the Queens Boulevard Line and the opening of Court Square station on the Crosstown line. Ely Avenue was the former name of 23rd Street until many named streets in the borough were given numbers by the Queens Topographical Bureau in 1915. Similarly, Van Alst Avenue is now 21st Street, while the former Nott Avenue is the present-day 44th Drive.

=== Connections and renovations ===
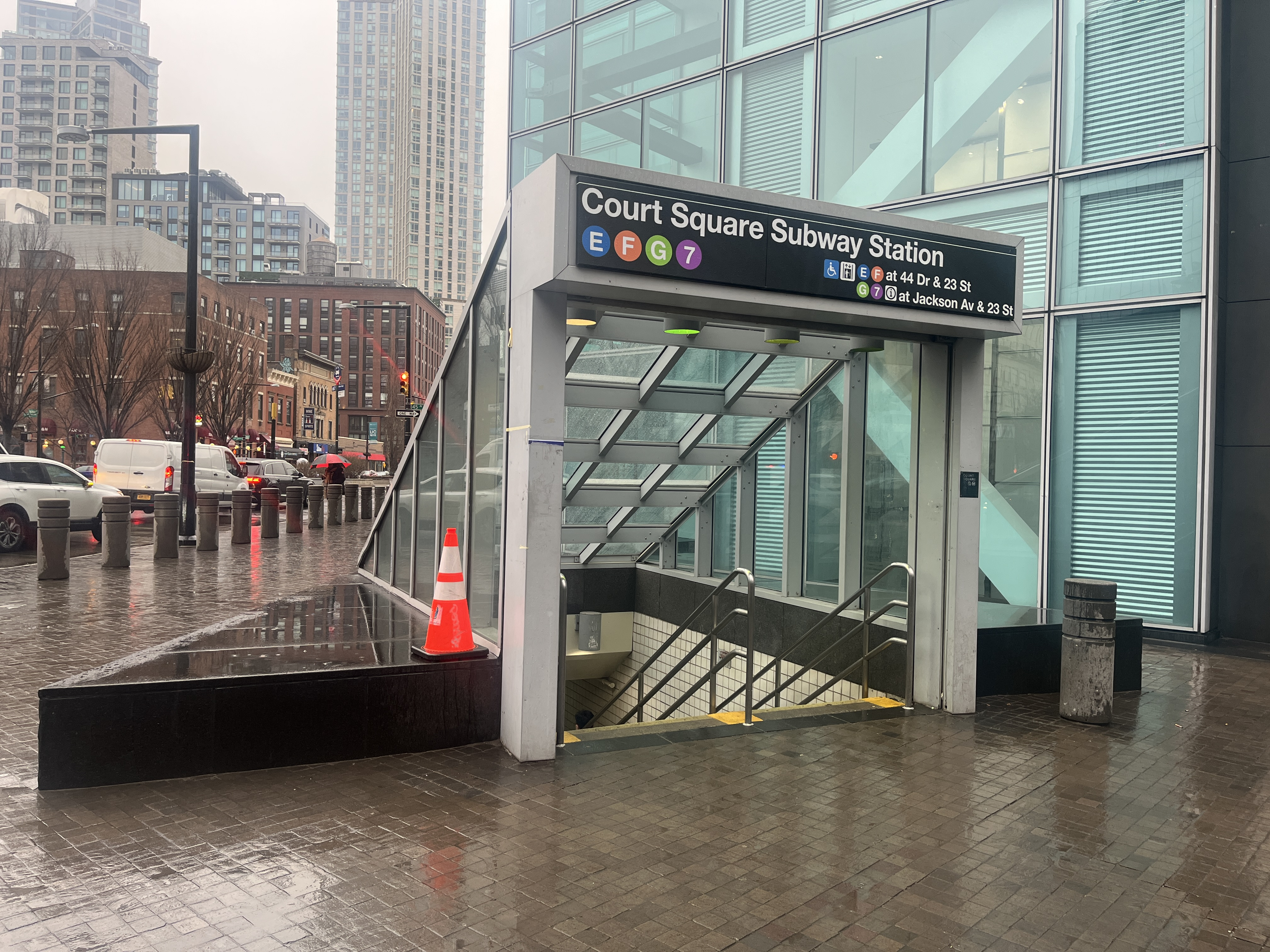
The 1990s-era entrance to the station, built under a renovation funded by Citicorp.

In 1984, the Metropolitan Transportation Authority (MTA) planned to construct a transfer passageway between the Queens Boulevard and Crosstown Line stations as part of a planned connector between the Queens Boulevard Line and the IND 63rd Street Line. Around 1986, Citigroup (then Citicorp) agreed to fund the passageway, at a cost of $8.5 million, as part of a zoning requirement for the construction of the adjacent One Court Square tower, which was being built to allow Citicorp to split its operations among several different buildings. Two of these buildings, Citigroup Center and 399 Park Avenue, were located near the Lexington Avenue–53rd Street station, the next stop southbound on the Queens Boulevard Line. However, that stop was located in Manhattan, across the East River from Queens. The company selected the Court Square site due to its proximity to the Queens Boulevard subway.

The building opened in 1989, with the passageway completed later on. In 2000, the MTA began designing a second in-system passageway between the Flushing and Crosstown Line stations. On December 16, 2001, the 63rd Street Line connector was opened and service on the Queens Boulevard Line was increased, requiring G trains to terminate at Court Square on weekdays. To compensate Crosstown riders going into Queens, a free out-of-system transfer to the Flushing Line station was created. In addition, moving walkways in the corridor between the Crosstown and Queens Boulevard Line platforms were installed in December 2001. The moving walkway was subsequently found to have limited benefits: it saved commuters an average of 9 seconds; was often out of service; and could only operate in one direction toward the Queens Boulevard Line platforms.

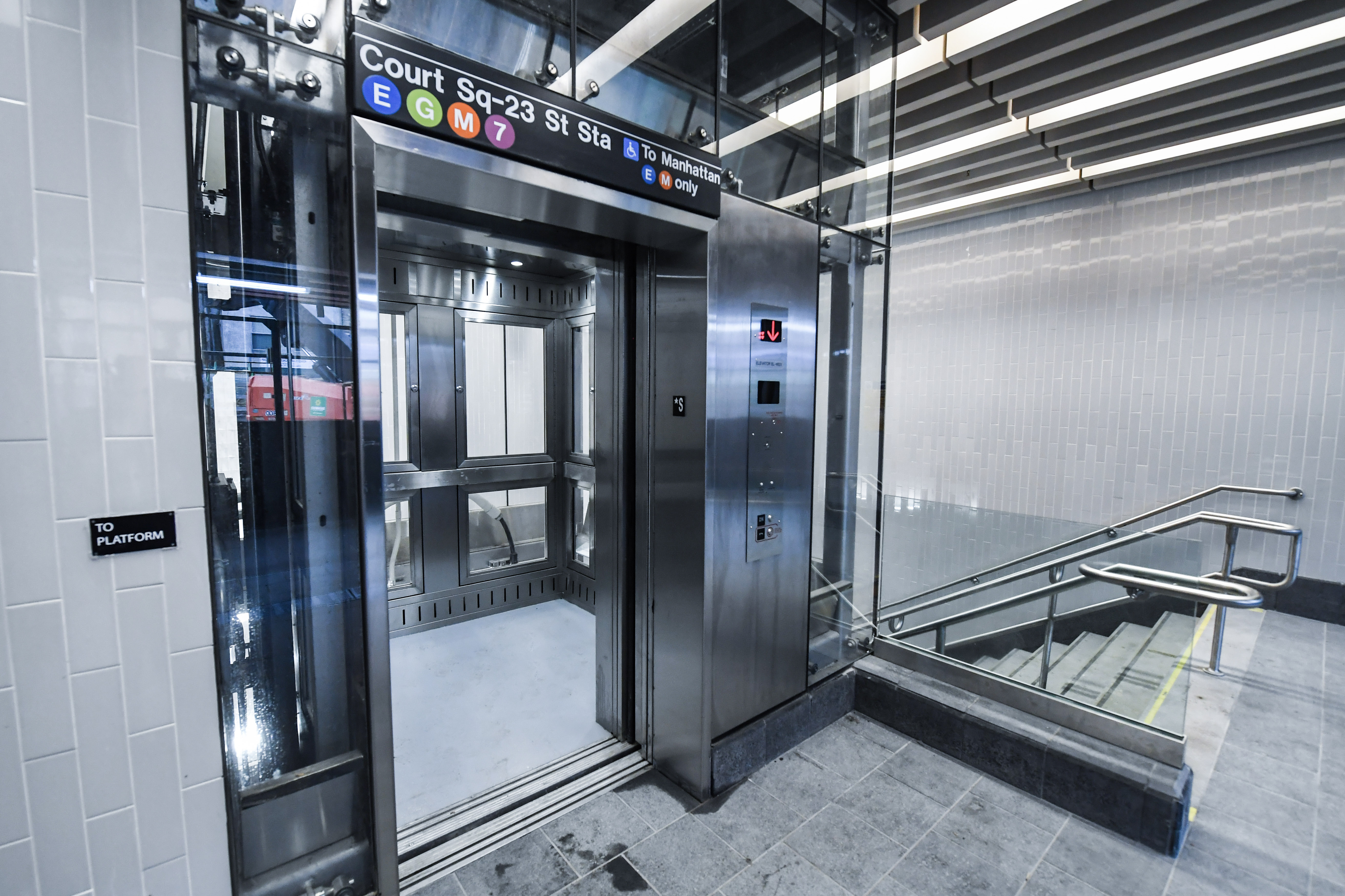
ADA-accessible elevator to the westbound Queens Boulevard Line platform

In October 2005, Citigroup announced they would be funding the passageway between the Flushing and Crosstown line stations, as a zoning requirement for the construction of the Court Square Two building. On March 17, 2011, the Queens Boulevard station was renamed to "Court Square–23rd Street". On June 3, 2011, the $47 million ADA-accessible connection between the Crosstown Line and Flushing Line stations was opened and the two stations were renamed "Court Square". Most of the project was funded by Citigroup, but $13.9 million was covered by the MTA. The Flushing Line station was closed from January 21 to April 2, 2012, to complete further renovations, including platform upgrades and alterations to the station's mezzanine to make the station fully ADA-compliant.

ADA accessibility for the Crosstown Line platform was funded as part of the 2015–2019 Capital Program. The elevator project was originally expected to begin in 2018. However, after the 14th Street Tunnel shutdown was announced in 2016, the project was placed on hold in favor of capacity improvements to accommodate displaced riders on the 14th Street Tunnel, used by riders of the L train. Two staircases between the IND Crosstown Line platform and the mezzanine were widened and two new staircases added, and the moving walkways were removed, providing additional capacity. In December 2021, the MTA awarded a contract for the installation of elevators at eight stations, including the Crosstown Line platform at the Court Square station, replacing one of the stairways which had been added in 2018. The project was scheduled to be completed in March 2023, but completion was pushed back to mid-July of that year.

In December 2019, the MTA announced that the Queens Boulevard Line platforms would become ADA-accessible as part of the agency's 2020–2024 Capital Program. With the construction of the Skyline Tower above the station in the late 2010s, its developer spent $17 million to construct a new entrance to the Queens Boulevard Line's westbound platform, which opened in March 2021. A future developer will construct an elevator from the westbound Queens Boulevard Line platform to the mezzanine. The MTA began receiving bids for the construction of a ramp to the eastbound platform in May 2023, and the contract was awarded that December. In April 2025, the Court Square–23rd Street station became one of the first New York City Subway stations to have all their MetroCard vending machines removed, amid the replacement of the MetroCard with the OMNY fare payment system.

== Station layout ==
Metrically accurate station map of Court Sq–23 St, showing platforms, mezzanines, stairs, elevators, escalators, exits, ticket machines (MetroCard and OMNY), gates, benches, and trashcans.

The station complex is located in Long Island City, in western Queens. It consists of three formerly separate stations along the IND Queens Boulevard Line, IND Crosstown Line, and IRT Flushing Line. There are several entrances to the complex, with two passageways within fare control connecting the stations. In addition, there is no direct connection between the Flushing and Queens Boulevard platforms.

=== Crosstown–Queens Boulevard Lines transfer passageway ===
The northernmost passageway, which is 360 feet (110 m) long, connects the eastern end of the Queens Boulevard Line station, at 44th Drive east of 23rd Street, with the north end of the Crosstown Line station at Jackson Avenue and 45th Avenue. This passageway was originally planned in the 1980s to compensate for the planned reroute of the G service away from the Queens Boulevard line when the track connection from the Queens Boulevard Line to the 63rd Street Line was completed (which ultimately occurred in 2001). It was constructed in the 1990s after Citigroup opened its 658-foot (201 m) office tower at One Court Square.

The passageway is split into two sections, and between these two sections is the full-time fare control area for the complex. The main fare control area has a ceiling with a skylight, as well as a turnstile bank, token booth, and two staircases. One has two escalators and goes up to south side of 44th Drive inside a Citibank location next to the tower, and the other is open weekdays only and leads to the entrance plaza of One Court Square. A set of escalators opposite the street stairs lead to the building's lobby.

Lining the walls of this passageway is Stream, a glass mosaic mural by Elizabeth Murray, which was installed in 2001. This is one of two murals Murray made for MTA Arts & Design; the other, Blooming, was installed at Lexington Avenue/59th Street.

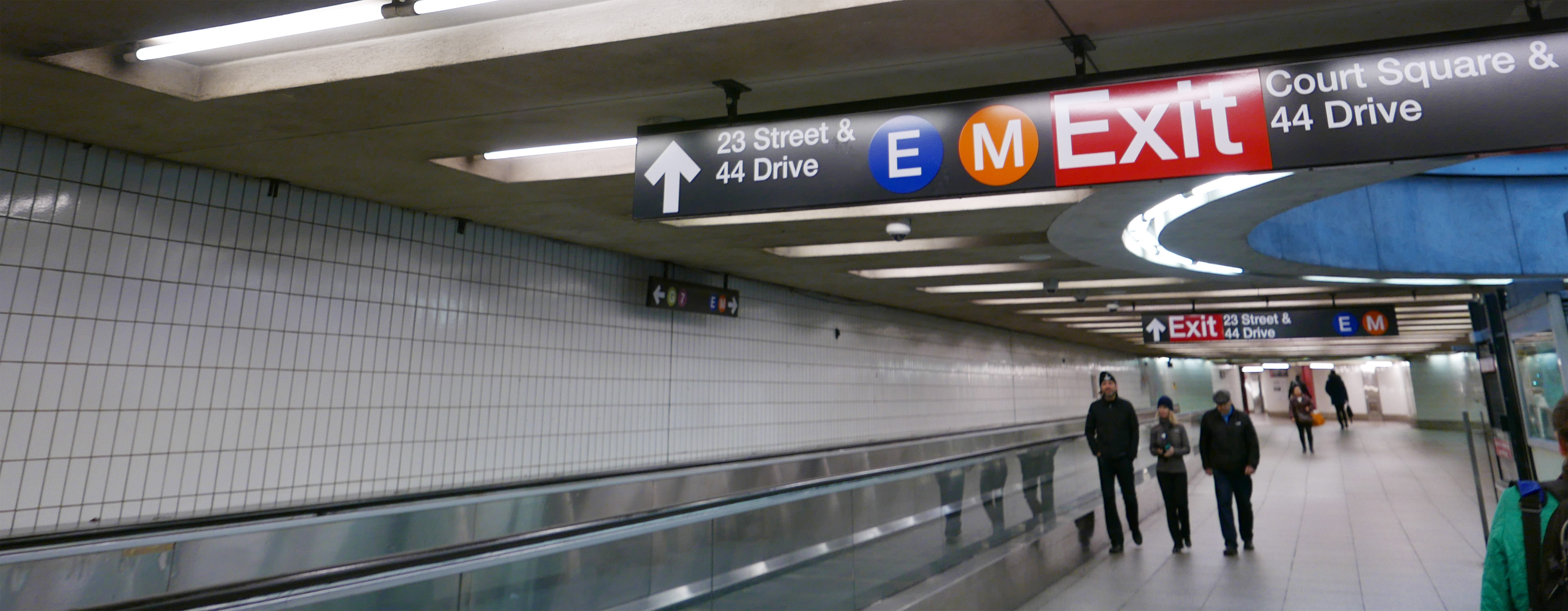
The former moving walkway, removed in summer 2018

=== Flushing–Crosstown Lines transfer passageway ===
The second passageway, opened in June 2011, consists of two escalators, one elevator, and one staircase within a glass-enclosed structure that connects the underground Crosstown Line station and the elevated Flushing Line station at 45th Road. Between 2001 and 2011, this was a free out-of-system transfer that could be made using MetroCards. The elevators provide ADA access to the IRT Flushing Line and IND Crosstown Line platforms, as well as an accessible transfer between the two sets of platforms (though not to the IND Queens Boulevard Line station). Starting in 2020, one of the stairs to the IND Crosstown Line platform was to be demolished and replaced with an elevator. The elevator from the Flushing–Crosstown Lines transfer passageway to the IND Crosstown Line platform opened in mid-July 2023.

== IRT Flushing Line platforms ==
Court Square
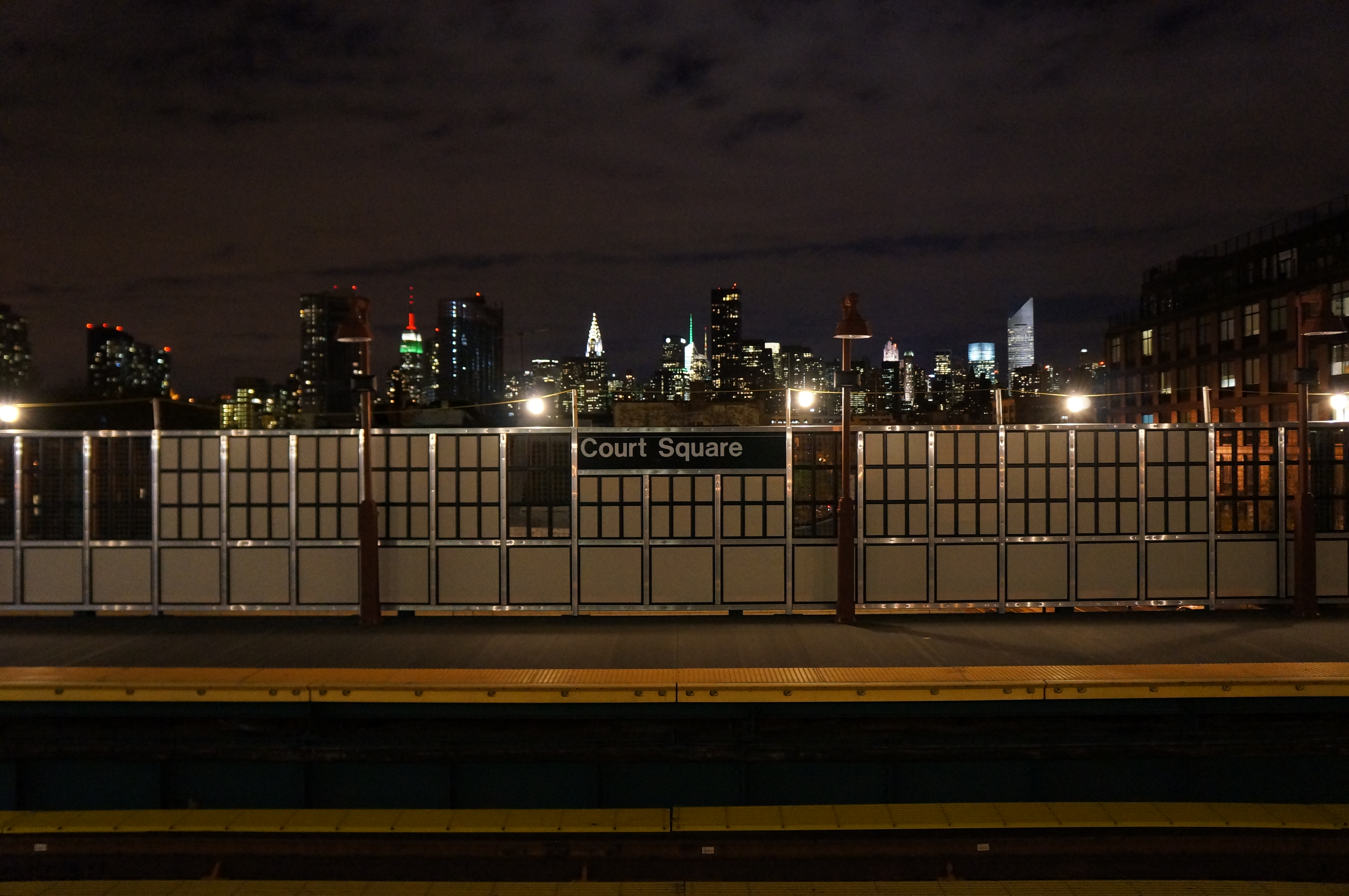
- View of westbound platform with Manhattan skyline

Station statistics
- Address: 45th Road & 23rd Street
- Division: A (IRT)
- Line: IRT Flushing Line
- Services: 7 (all times) <7> (rush hours until 9:30 p.m., peak direction)
- Structure: Elevated
- Platforms: 2 side platforms
- Tracks: 2

Other information
- Opened: November 5, 1916; 110 years ago (first station); June 3, 2011; 15 years ago (second station)
- Accessible: Yes (Transfer accessible to IND Crosstown Line platform only)
- Former/other names: 45th Road–Court House Square
Services
Preceding station	New York City Subway	Following station
Hunters Point Avenue 7 <7> toward 34th Street–Hudson Yards	7 (New York City Subway service)	Queensboro Plaza 7 <7> toward Flushing–Main Street
Track layout
Station service legend
Symbol	Description
Stops all times	Stops all times
Stops rush hours in the peak direction only	Stops rush hours in the peak direction only
- 45th Road – Court House Square (Dual System IRT)
- U.S. National Register of Historic Places
- MPS: New York City Subway System MPS
- NRHP reference No.: 05000229
- Added to NRHP: March 3, 2005

The Court Square station on the IRT Flushing Line, previously called the 45th Road–Court House Square station, is a local elevated station with two side platforms and two tracks. The 7 train stops here at all times, and the <7> train stops here during rush hours in the peak direction. The next stop to the west is Hunters Point Avenue, while the next stop to the east is Queensboro Plaza. The station opened on November 5, 1916, as 45th Road–Court House Square. The station measures 55.5 feet (16.9 m) wide and was originally 350 feet (110 m) long. As part of the 1950s platform-lengthening project, the platforms were increased from 480 to 565 feet (146 to 172 m) long. The platforms generally measure 12 feet (3.7 m) wide.

As with other elevated viaducts built by the IRT, the elevated structure at Court Square is carried on two column bents, one on each side of the road, at places where the tracks are no more than 29 feet (8.8 m) above the ground level. There is zigzag lateral bracing at intervals of every four panels.

The original wooden platforms were placed atop the metal trusses of the viaduct and had corrugated-metal windscreens. The platforms were mostly covered by steel canopies with support frames, except at the northernmost 85 feet (26 m) of each platform. There were employee rooms above the southern end of the eastbound platform. The current platforms were installed in the 2012 renovations and are made of fiberglass. They are composed of numerous panels of composite fiberglass resin, lighter than conventional concrete and designed to resist corrosion and thermal expansion. The platform edges have ADA-compliant tactile strips. Both platforms have beige windscreens that run along their entire lengths and brown canopies with green frames and support columns except for a small section at their north ends. Small sections of the windscreens are mesh, allowing a view into the local area.

=== Exits ===
This station has an elevated station house beneath the tracks at the extreme south end. A single staircase from each platform goes down to a combined waiting area and crossunder, where a turnstile bank provides entrance and exit from the station. Near these staircases, one elevator leads from each platform to the mezzanine. Outside fare control, there is a token booth; an elevator and two staircases go down to the northwestern corner of 45th Road and 23rd Street. Two escalators and a staircase, located within an enclosed structure, lead directly to the complex's underground mezzanine area via a new transfer passageway. The northbound platform's elevator also leads to the underground mezzanine within fare control, stopping at the station house level but bypassing the street along the way. The southbound platform's elevator only connects that platform to the station house. A single staircase also leads to the southwestern corner of 45th Road and 23rd Street. It is signposted as serving only the Flushing Line station, as opposed to all three stations of the complex.

The original station house, demolished as part of the 2011 renovation, had a relatively simple design. The exterior walls of the old station house were clad in painted metal. There were wooden windows to the north, south, and east. On the southern facade of the old station house, there were square panels below each window, as well as a set of three-by-three windows. There was a standing-seam metal roof above the southern part of the station house. The floor of the station house was made of concrete (divided by wooden strips) and supported by a wooden deck. Inside the station house was a station agent's booth on the south wall, a bank of turnstiles in the center, and three staff rooms to the north. The ceiling of the station house was made of concrete, which was painted.

The station house formerly had two more staircases leading to either eastern corner, as well as another staircase to the northwestern corner. These staircases had simple railings and were covered by cantilevered canopies. The former staircases at the northeastern and southeastern corners of 45th Road and 23rd Street were replaced in June 2011 by the in-system transfer to the underground platforms, which added a new staircase to the former southeast corner of the intersection. As part of the project, a short strip of 45th Road between 23rd Street and Jackson Avenue was de-mapped, while the adjacent Albert Short Triangle was renovated. In the early 20th century, there were requests for an additional entrance from 23rd Street at the north end of the station, but this was never constructed.

=== Gallery ===
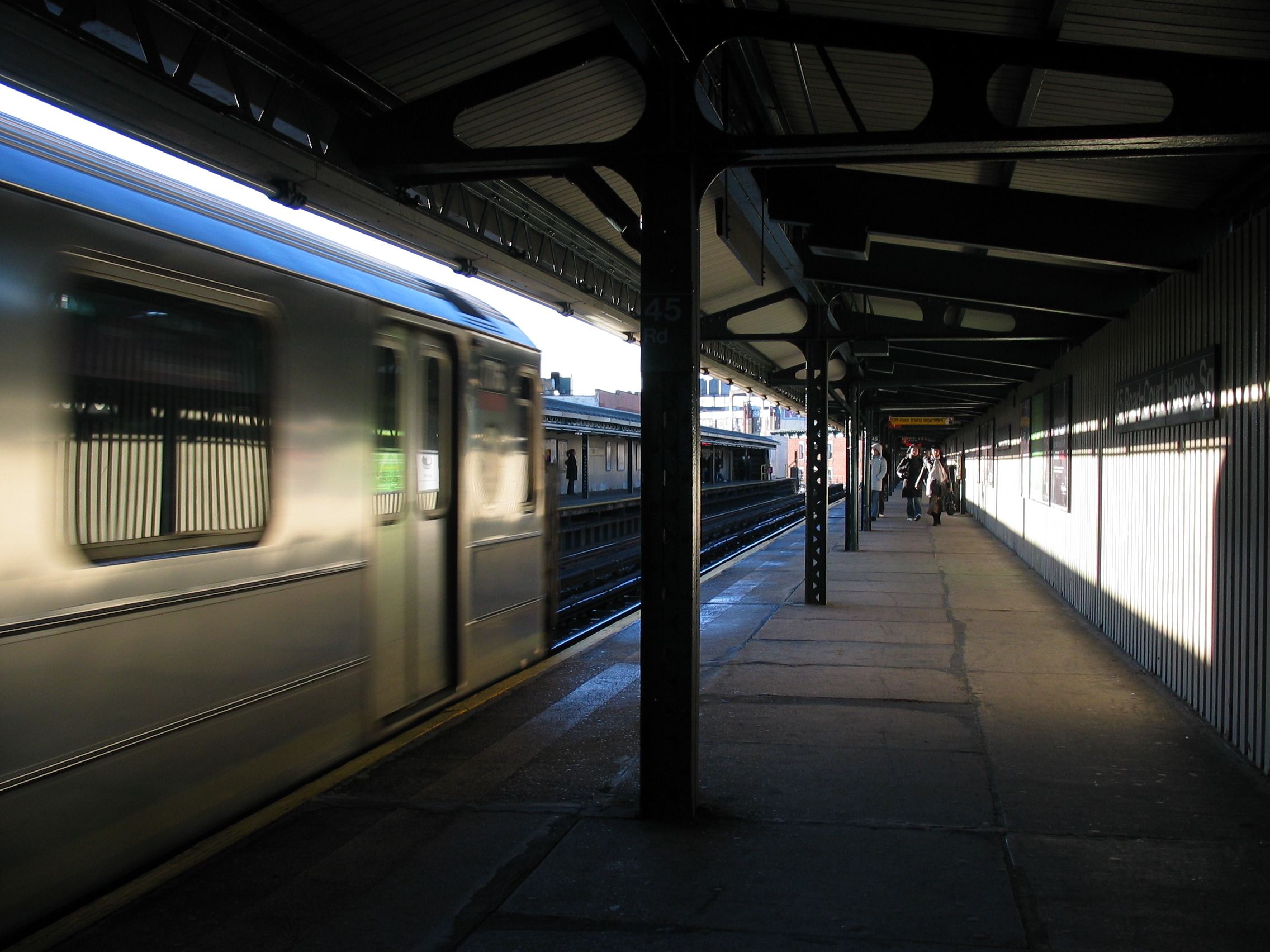
Manhattan-bound platform before renovation, looking south

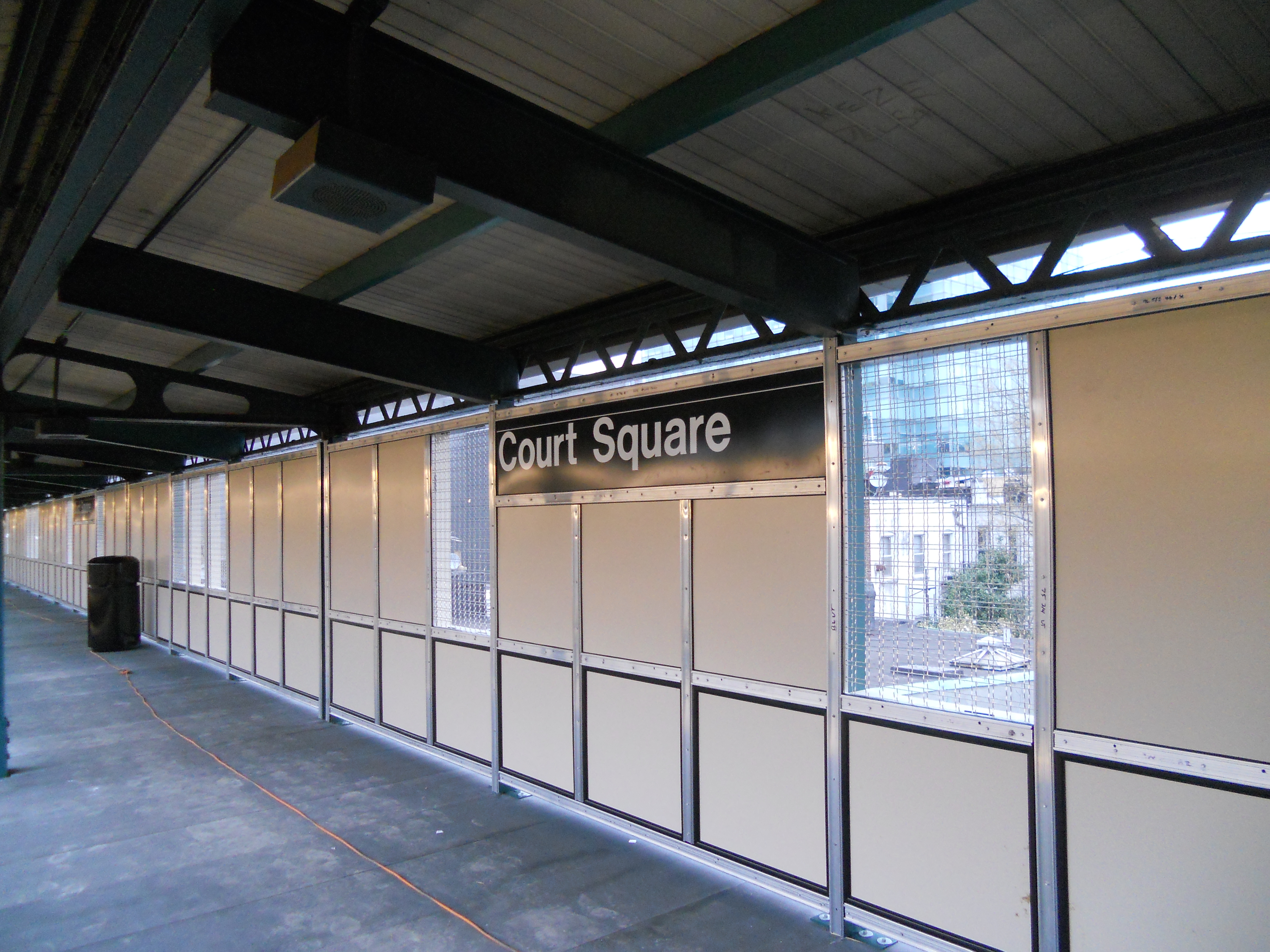
Covered section of new platform at Court Square

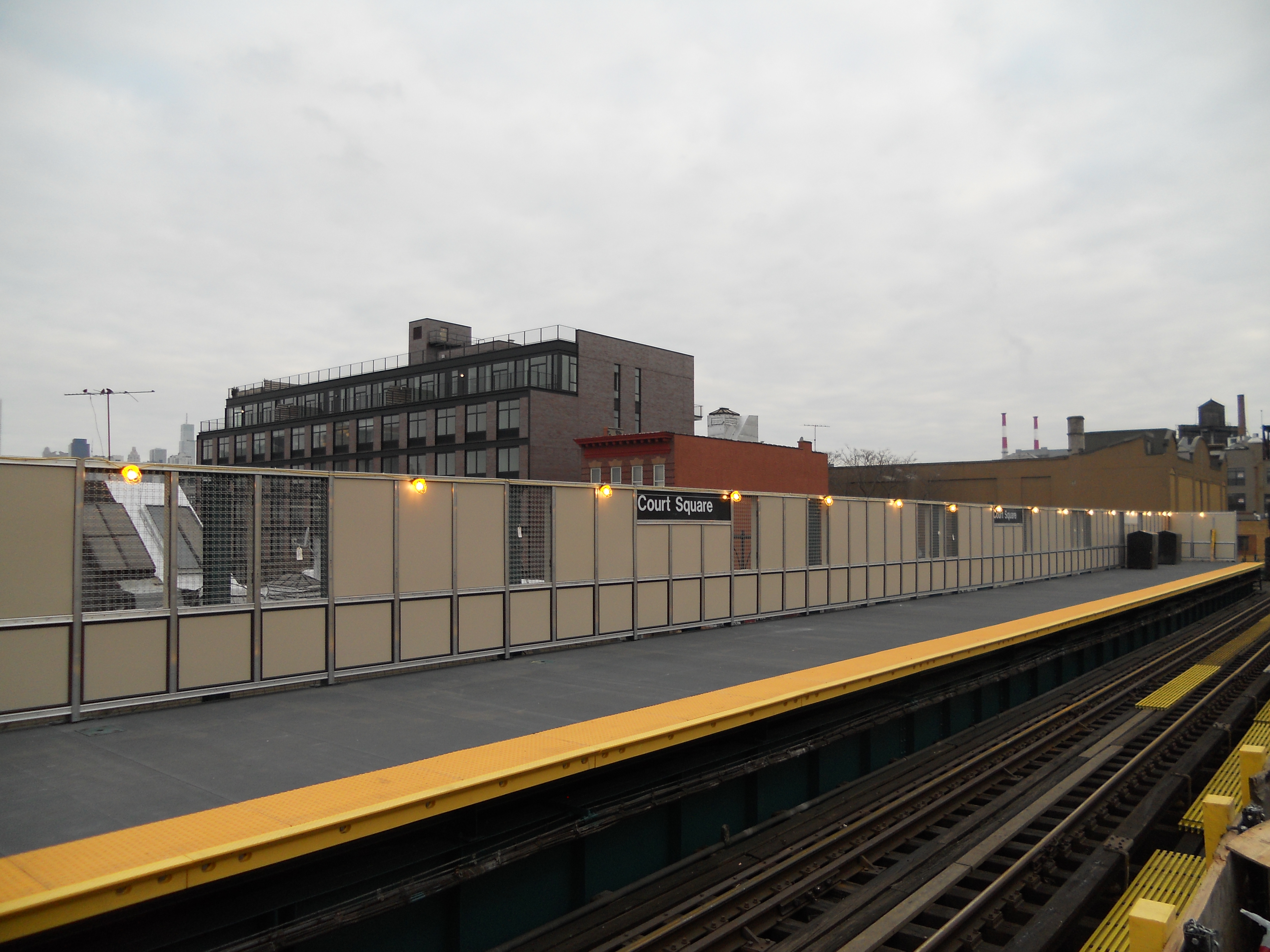
Outdoor section of new platform

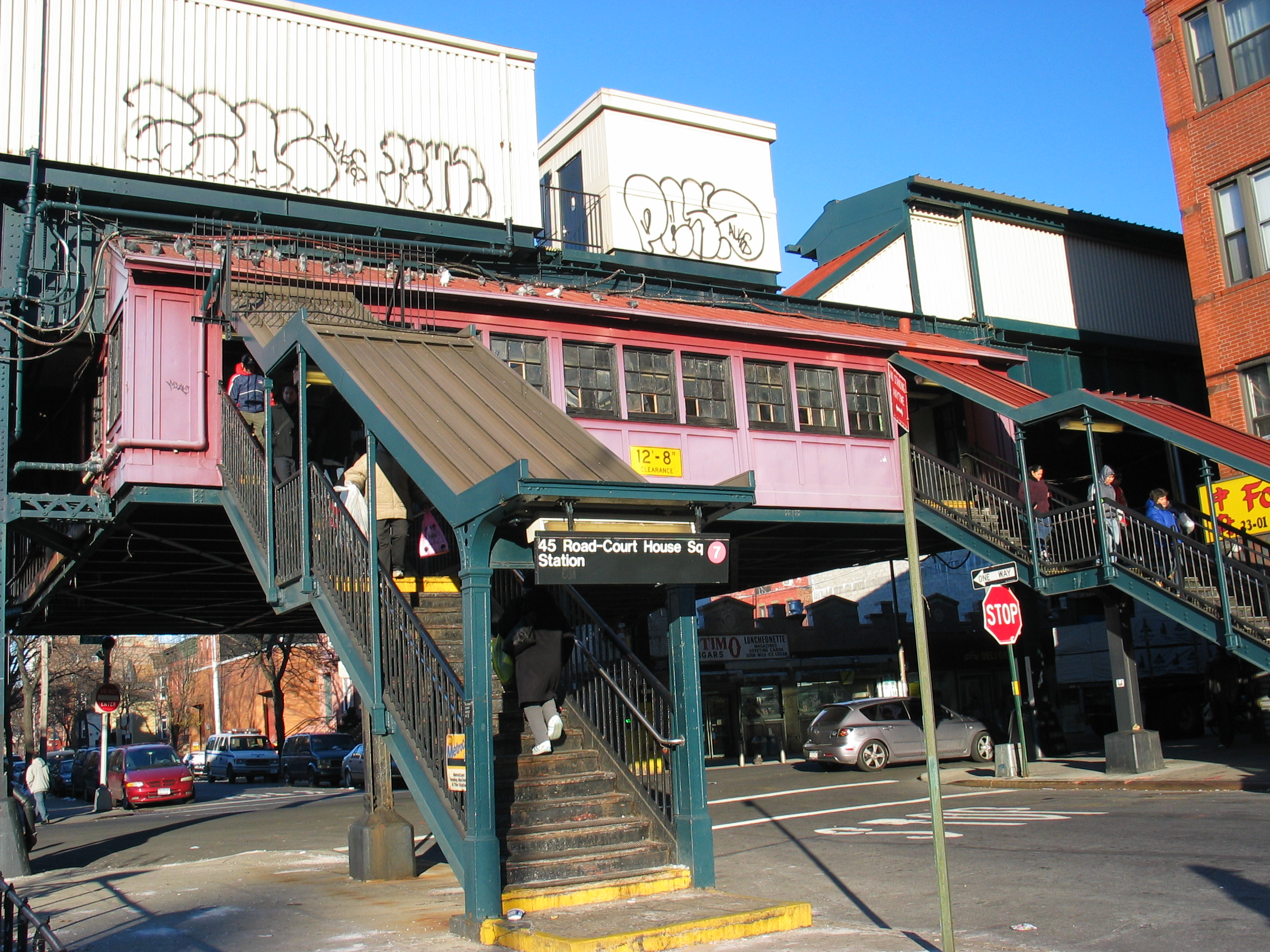
Station entrance in December 2004, prior to the construction of the direct connection to the IND complex

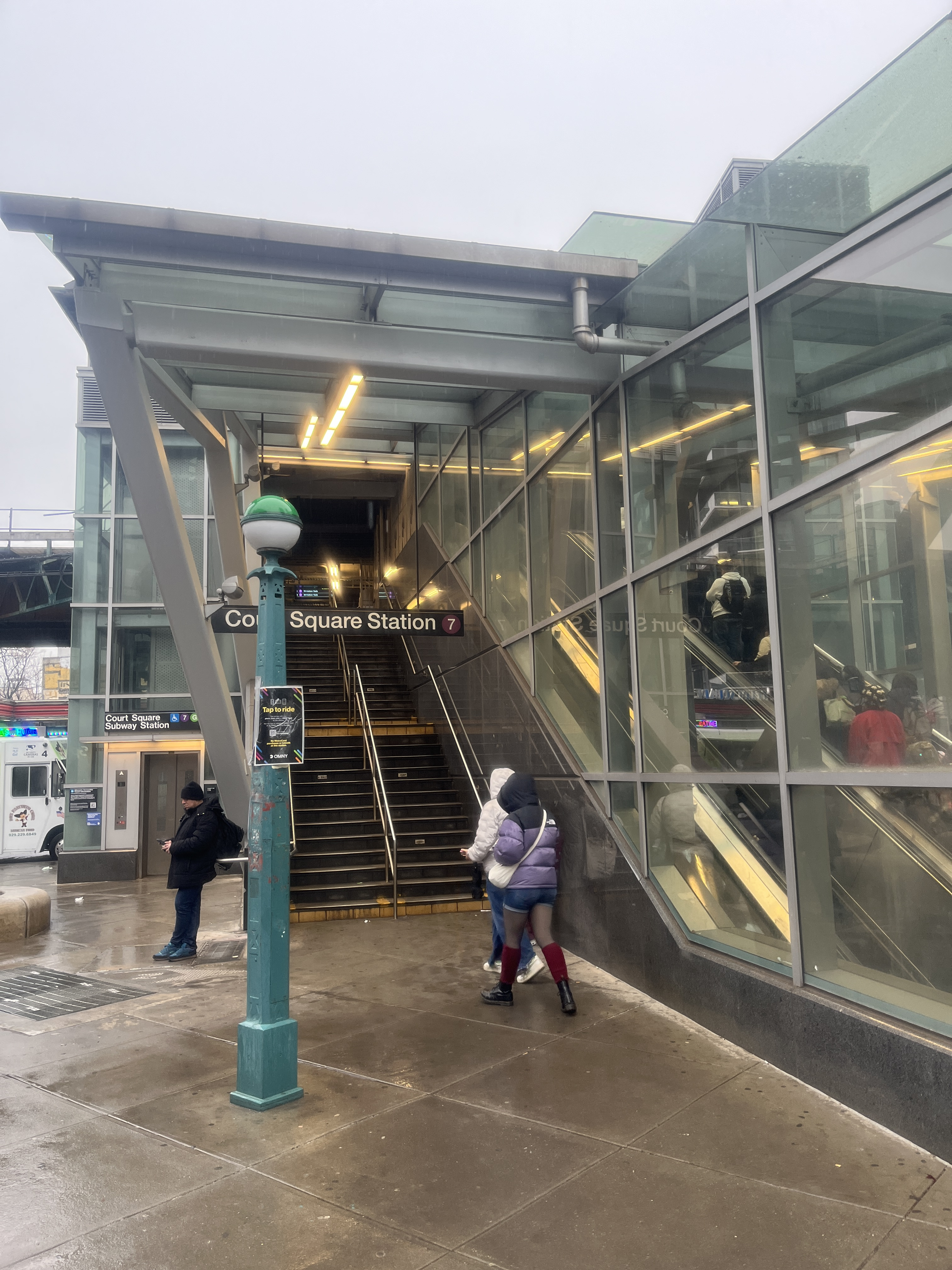
Station entrance post-renovation, with connecting stairway

== IND Queens Boulevard Line platforms ==
Court Square–23 Street
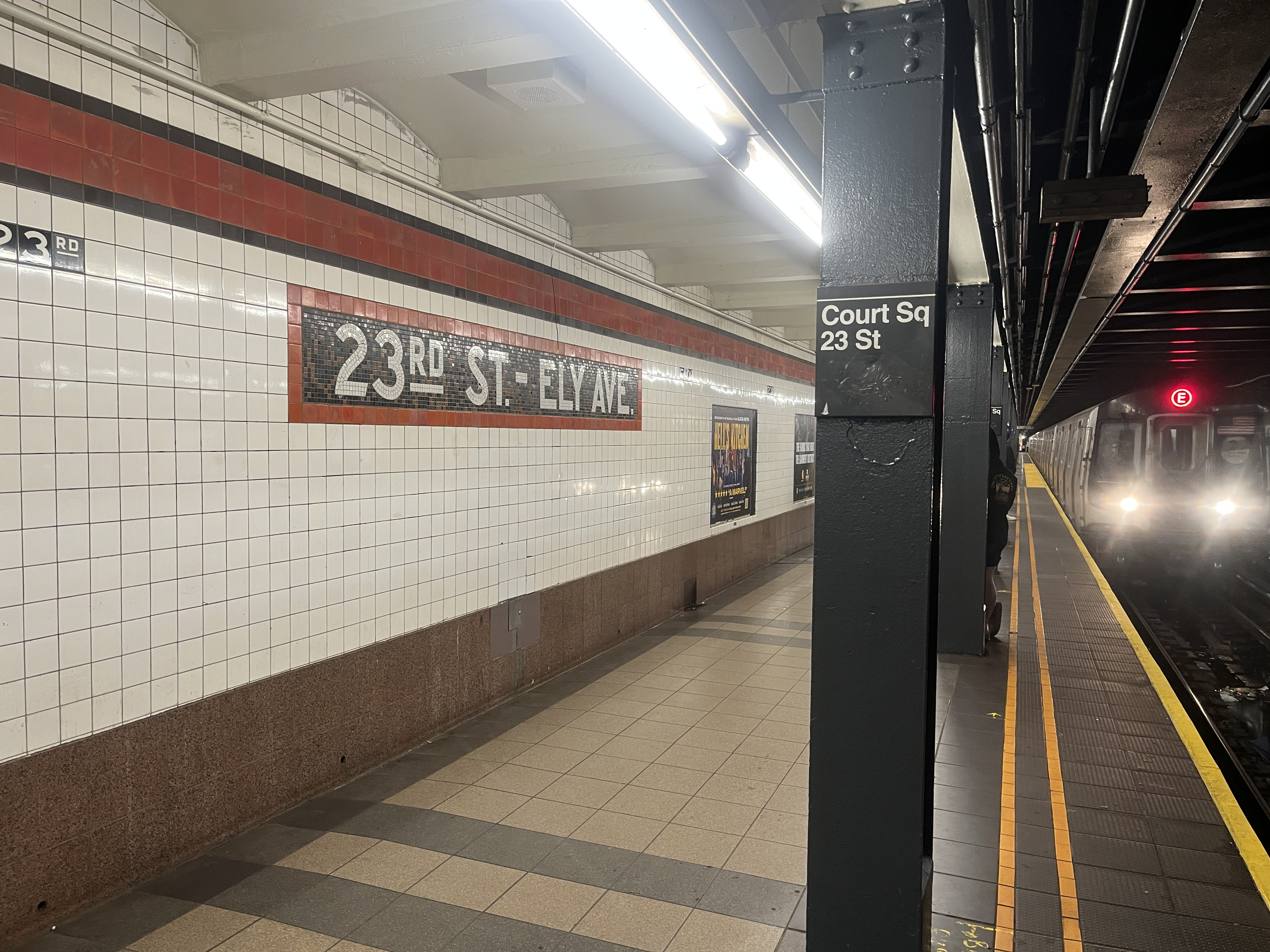
- View of southbound platform

Station statistics
- Address: 23rd Street & 44th Drive
- Division: B (IND)
- Line: IND Queens Boulevard Line
- Services: E (all times); F (weekday) <F> (two rush hour trains, peak direction)
- Structure: Underground
- Platforms: 2 side platforms
- Tracks: 2

Other information
- Opened: August 28, 1939; 87 years ago
- Accessible: Partially; full access under construction (Manhattan-bound only; eastbound accessibility under construction, targeted for completion 4th quarter 2026. Transfers to other routes are not ADA-accessible.)
- Former/other names: 23rd Street–Ely Avenue
Services
Preceding station	New York City Subway	Following station
Lexington Avenue–53rd Street E F <F> via Fifth Avenue/53rd Street	E (New York City Subway service) F (New York City Subway service)	Queens Plaza E F <F> via Forest Hills–71st Avenue
Track layout
Station service legend
Symbol	Description
Stops all times	Stops all times
Stops weekdays during the day	Stops weekdays during the day

The Court Square–23rd Street station, previously called the 23rd Street–Ely Avenue station, on the IND Queens Boulevard Line is an underground station with two tracks and two side platforms. The E train serves the station at all times, while the F train serves the station on weekdays during the day. Limited <F> trains serve the station northbound during AM rush hours and southbound during PM rush hours. The next stop to the west is Lexington Avenue–53rd Street, while the next stop to the east is Queens Plaza. It is located along 44th Drive between 21st and 23rd Streets and is the westernmost station on the line in Queens. Going by railroad directions, Court Square–23rd Street is the Queens Boulevard Line's southernmost station in Queens. 23rd Street–Ely Avenue opened on August 28, 1939.

The platform walls have a scarlet lake trim line with a dark olive border and mosaic name tablets reading "23RD ST. – ELY AVE." in white sans serif letting on a dark olive background and scarlet lake border. Below the trim line are small tile captions alternating between "23RD" and "ELY" in white on black, and directional signs in the same style are present below some of the name tablets. The tile band is part of a color-coded tile system used throughout the IND. The tile colors were designed to facilitate navigation for travelers going away from Lower Manhattan. As such, a different tile color is used at Queens Plaza, the next express station to the east; the red tiles used at the Court Square–23rd Street station were also used at Lexington Avenue–53rd Street and Fifth Avenue/53rd Street to the west. Red I-beam columns run along both platforms at regular intervals with alternating ones having the standard black station name plate in white lettering.

There are four ceramic mosaic/relief murals on the two platforms and connecting mezzanines, made by Frank Olt in 1992. Each one has an individual title according to nearby plaques. Collectively they are known as the Temple Quad Reliefs.

On December 8, 2025, the F and <F> express trains began serving the station on weekdays during the day, running via the 53rd Street Tunnel. The M train began running via the 63rd Street Tunnel during weekdays when it runs to Queens.

=== Exits ===
This station has three entrances and exits; the full-time one is at the extreme geographical east end. A single staircase from each platform leads up to a crossover. On the Manhattan-bound side, there is a turnstile bank to a staircase and an elevator to the Manhattan-bound platform from the northeastern corner of 23rd Street and 44th Drive. The entrance was renovated and the elevator was added as part of the construction of the Skyline Tower at the northeast corner of this intersection. There is a little wheelchair ramp and a 3-step staircase that connects the Manhattan-bound platform to the new staircase and elevator entrance. Originally, there was one exit-only turnstile and one full-height turnstile from the crossover to a single staircase that went up to the same corner, but it was demolished when the current entrance to the corner was built.

The long passageway to the IND Crosstown Line platform extends to the south, past the crossover. Prior to the construction of the passageway, this exit contained a full-time token booth and staircases to both sides of 44th Drive.

This station's second fare control area is at the station's extreme western end. A single staircase from each platform goes up to a raised crossover split in two by a steel fence. The Manhattan-bound side has a turnstile bank, token booth, and one staircase going up to the northeastern corner of 21st Street and 44th Drive while the Queens-bound side has two exit-only turnstiles and one staircase going up to the southeastern corner of the same intersection. All fare control areas have their original IND-style directional mosaics.

=== Gallery ===
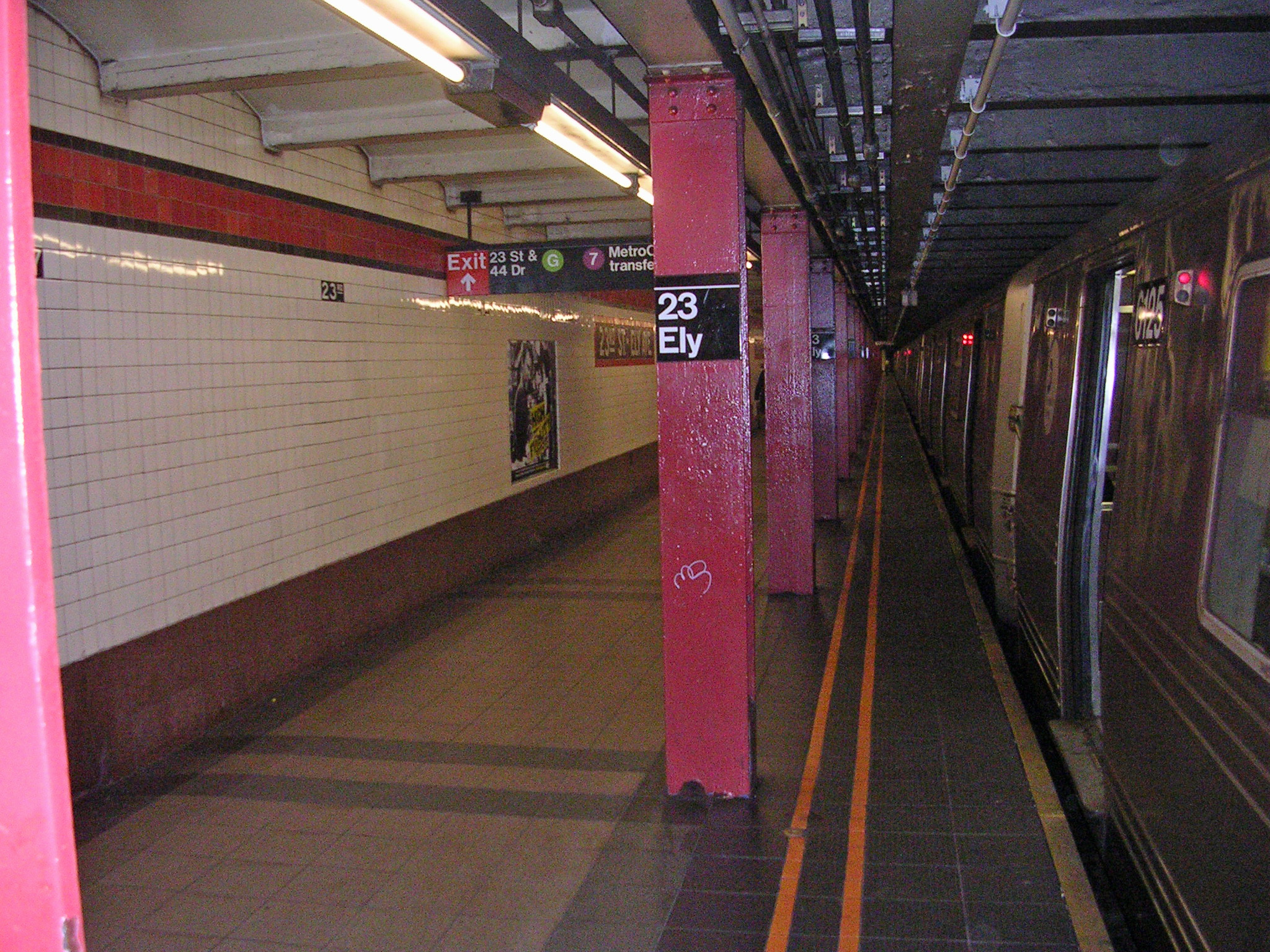
The Manhattan-bound platform as it looked when the station was known as "23rd Street – Ely Avenue"

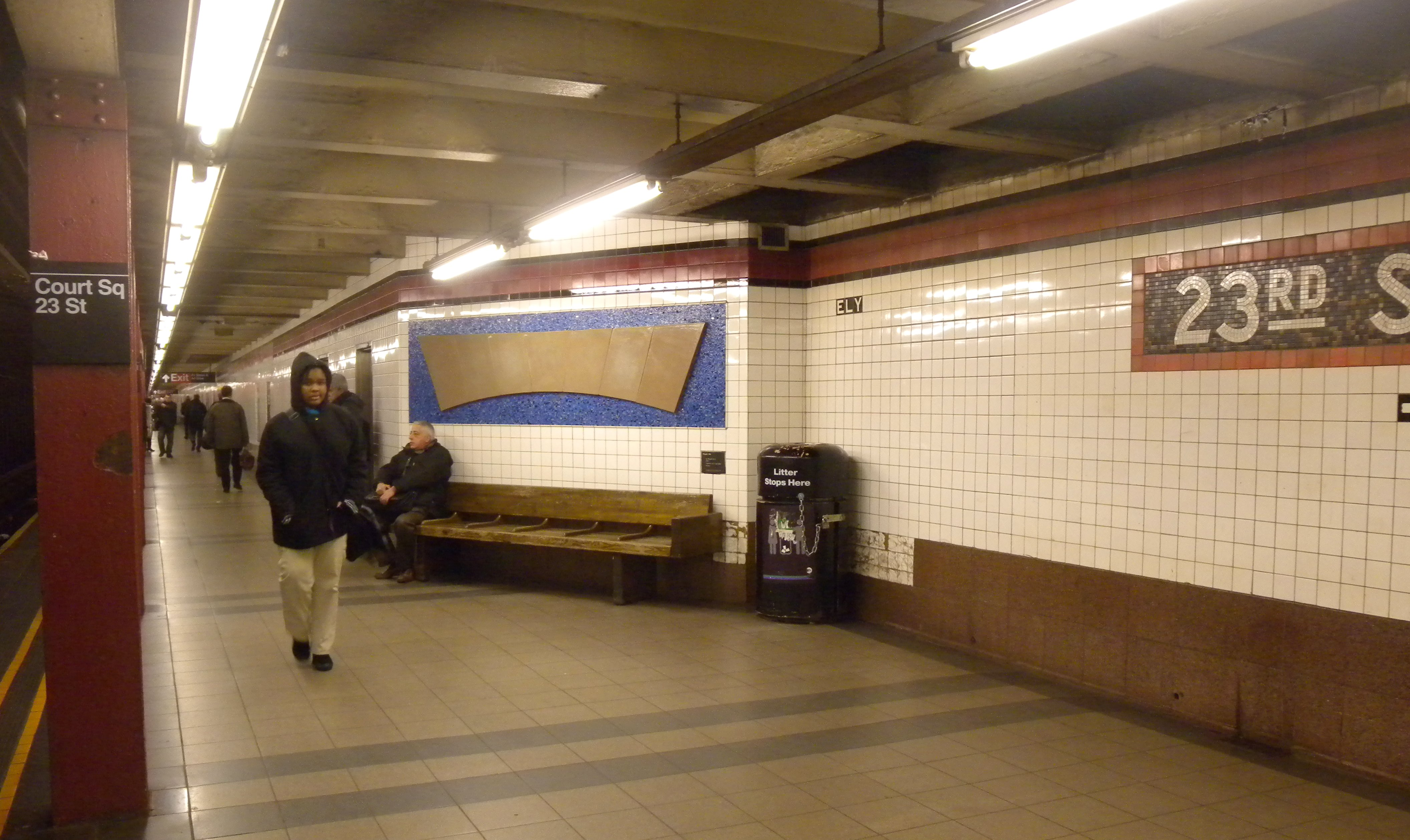
The Manhattan-bound platform with updated Helvetica signs and a part of Temple Quad Reliefs

== IND Crosstown Line platform ==
Court Square
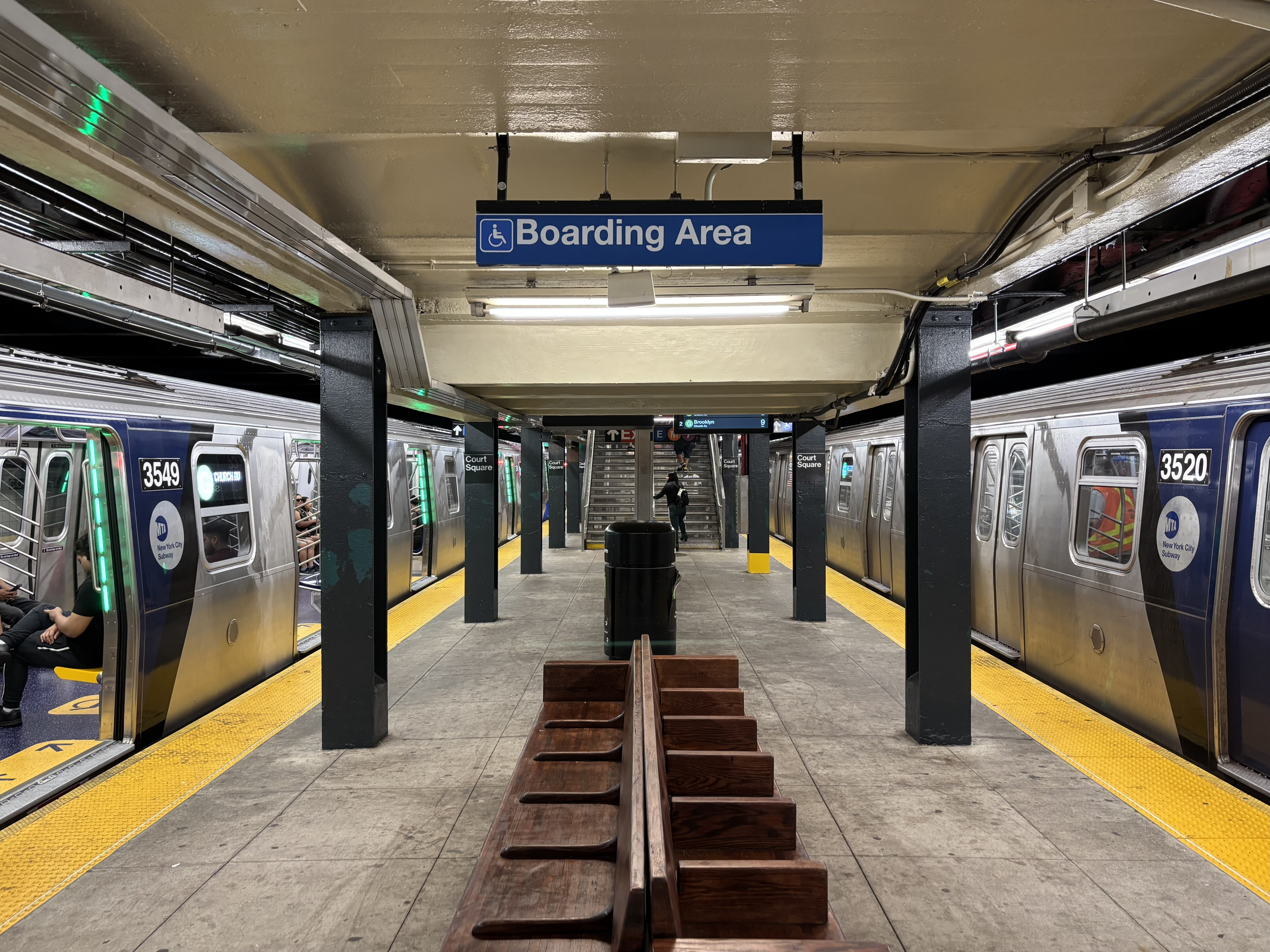
- R211A G trains stopped at the platform

Station statistics
- Address: 45th Avenue & Jackson Avenue
- Division: B (IND)
- Line: IND Crosstown Line
- Services: G (all times)
- Structure: Underground
- Platforms: 1 island platform
- Tracks: 2

Other information
- Opened: August 19, 1933; 93 years ago
- Accessible: Yes (Transfer accessible to IRT Flushing Line platforms only)
- Former/other names: Long Island City–Court Square
Services
Preceding station	New York City Subway	Following station
Terminus	G (New York City Subway service)	21st Street toward Church Avenue
Non-revenue services and lines
Preceding station	New York City Subway	Following station
Queens Plaza Queens Blvd local	no service	
Track layout
Station service legend
Symbol	Description
Stops all times	Stops all times

The Court Square station, previously called the Long Island City−Court Square station, is the northernmost station on the IND Crosstown Line and the northern terminal for G trains at all times. The next stop to the south is 21st Street. The station has one island platform between two tracks; the platform generally measures 19.5 feet (5.9 m) wide.

Although G service terminates here, the tracks themselves continue north and merge with the 60th Street Tunnel Connection to form the IND Queens Boulevard Line's local tracks just south of Queens Plaza. This section of the tracks is not used in regular service, though until April 19, 2010, trains traveled over this connection to continue to Forest Hills–71st Avenue at various times of the day. Just south of the station, the two tracks split into three, then merge again into two tracks. The third track is used to switch trains between track directions.

Each track wall has a green trim line with a black border and small "COURT SQ" tile captions below it in white lettering on black background. The platforms have green I-beam columns, which are spaced every 15 feet (4.6 m) and placed 3 feet 5 inches (1.04 m) from the platform edge. The tiles are also part of a color-coded tile system used throughout the IND. Because the Crosstown Line does not merge into a line that enters Manhattan at either end, all stations on the line had green tiles.

=== Exits ===
Three staircases from the platform go up to the full length mezzanine above and a passageway within fare control connects the station to the Queens Boulevard platform. All fare control areas are unstaffed, containing just full height turnstiles. The main fare control area has a single staircase that goes up to the southwest corner of Jackson Avenue and Court Square West, and a staircase to the north side of Jackson Avenue at Thompson Avenue in front of One Court Square. There was previously a street stair to the southeast corner of Court Square West and Jackson Avenue and another to the southwest corner of Pearson Street and Jackson Avenue; the latter is currently used as employee space.

After the IND 63rd Street Line was connected to the Queens Boulevard Line in December 2001, during a project known as the "63rd Street Connector", another unstaffed entrance was added to the south end of the mezzanine at 45th Road. This was done to allow an out-of-system transfer to the IRT Flushing Line. From this fare control area, a single staircase goes up to the north side of Jackson Avenue at Pearson Street directly outside the staircases to the IRT station. A second staircase to the southwest corner of the intersection no longer exists. In June 2011, this transfer was replaced by an enclosed in-system transfer that consists of two escalators, one elevator, and one staircase connecting both stations.

=== Gallery ===
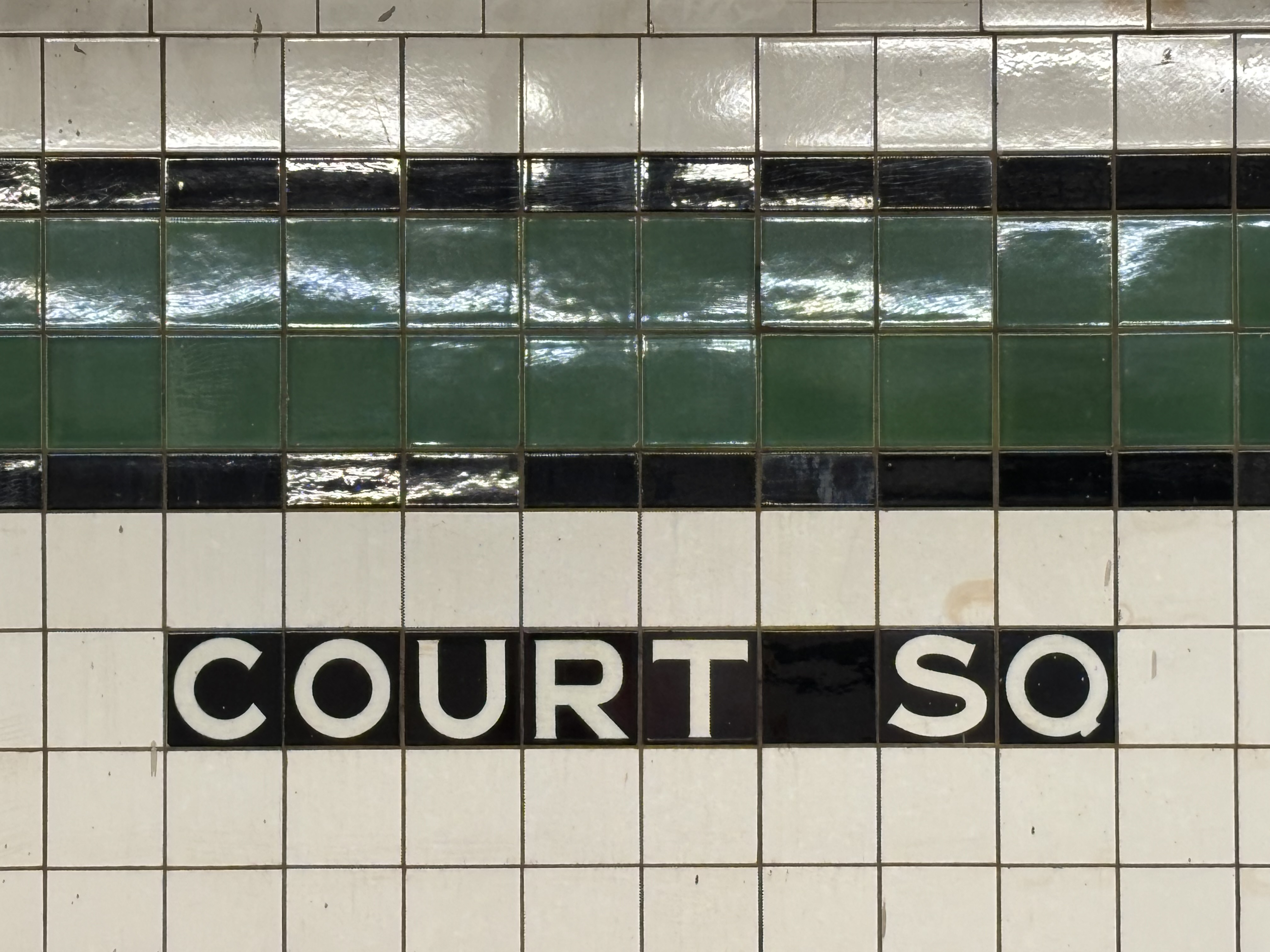
Tile caption below trim line

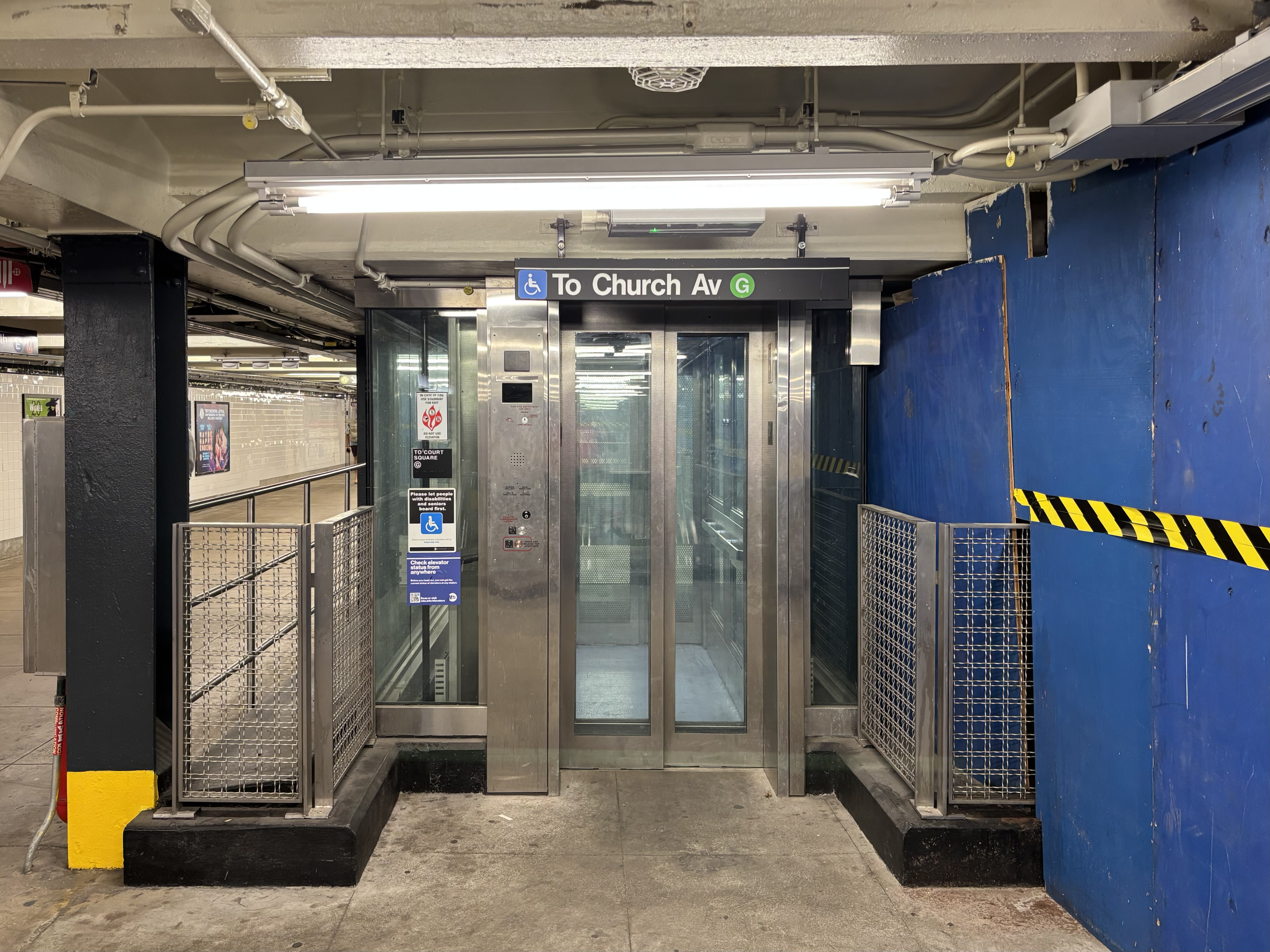
Elevator to the platform

== Nearby points of interest ==
The P.S. 1 Contemporary Art Center (MoMA PS1) is nearby at 46th and Jackson Avenues. The One Court Square building, owned by Citicorp, sits right above the station as well. Queens County Criminal Court is directly on Court Square, just east of Jackson Avenue.

The site of the 5 Pointz building at Jackson Avenue and Davis Street, which was famously covered in graffiti until its demolition in 2014, is visible just south of the Flushing Line station and can be seen by passing 7 and <7> trains.

The station sits in the center of the Hunters Point Historic District, and many historic buildings can be found near the station. However, the area right around the station is also seeing a revitalization, with high-rise residential condominiums and rental buildings being built in the area, and upscale restaurants being built near the train station. There was also a 15,000-square-foot (1,400 m^{2}) supermarket proposed for the area. Trader Joe's eventually opened a location immediately adjacent to the station and the Court Square Diner in 2021.

== See also ==
- National Register of Historic Places listings in Queens, New York
