= Nassau Avenue station =

New York City Subway station in Brooklyn

Nassau Avenue
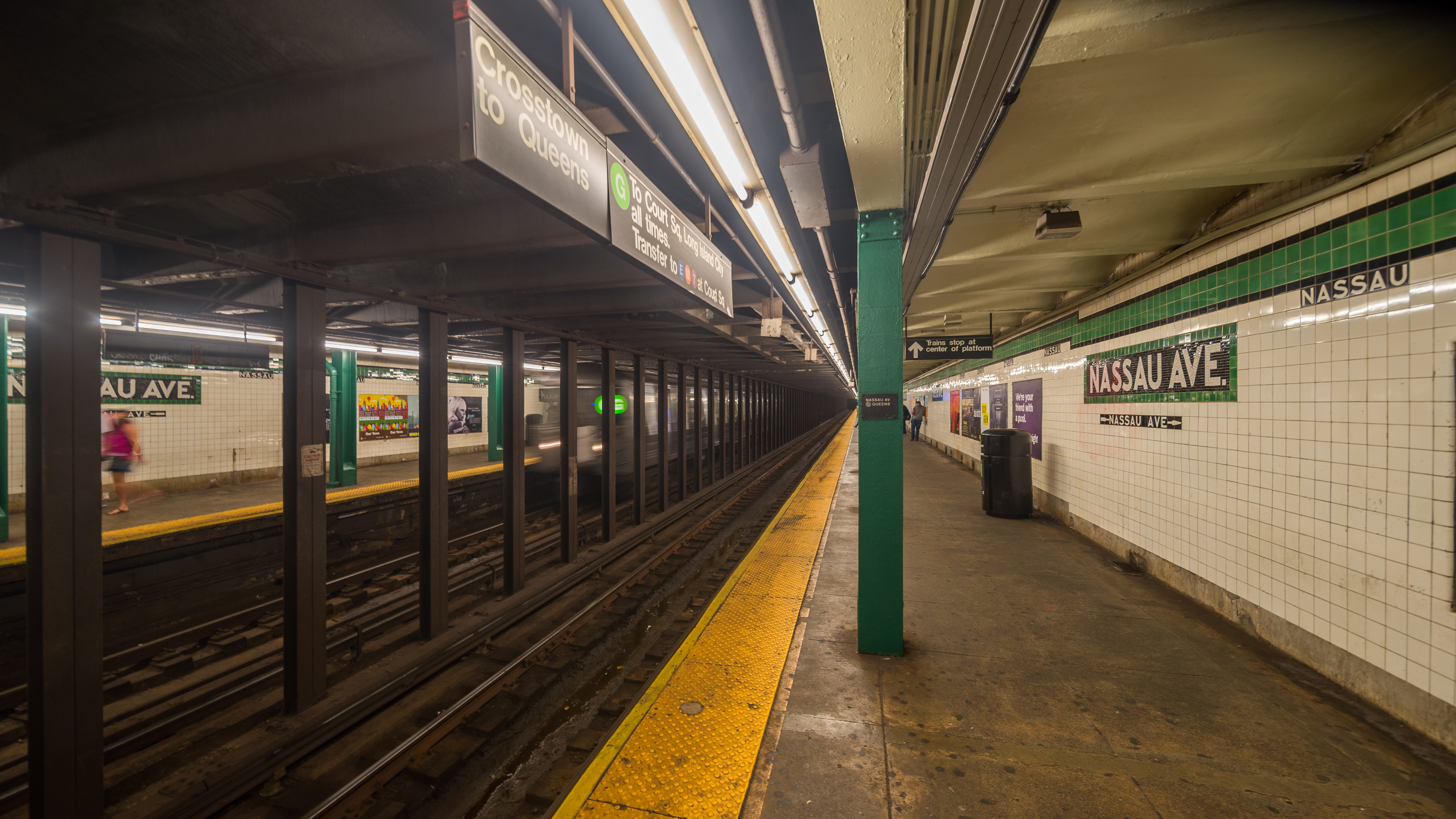
- View from northbound platform

Station statistics
- Address: Nassau Avenue & Manhattan Avenue; Brooklyn, New York
- Borough: Brooklyn
- Locale: Greenpoint
- Coordinates: 40.723811°N 73.95082°W
- Division: B (IND)
- Line: IND Crosstown Line
- Services: G (all times)
- Transit: NYCT Bus: B43, B48, B62
- Structure: Underground
- Platforms: 2 side platforms
- Tracks: 2

Other information
- Opened: August 19, 1933; 93 years ago
- Accessible: No; planned

Traffic
- 2025: 2,633,112 ▲18.5%
- Rank: 145 out of 423
Services
Preceding station	New York City Subway	Following station
Greenpoint Avenue toward Court Square	G (New York City Subway service)	Metropolitan Avenue toward Church Avenue
Location
Location within New York City Subway
Location within New York City
Location within New York
Track layout
Street map
Station service legend
Symbol	Description
Stops all times	Stops all times

The Nassau Avenue station is a station on the IND Crosstown Line of the New York City Subway. Located at the intersection of Manhattan and Nassau Avenues in Greenpoint, Brooklyn, it is served by the G train at all times.

== History ==
This station opened on August 19, 1933 as the initial terminal station for the IND Crosstown Line. With the completion of the Crosstown Line on July 1, 1937, Nassau Avenue ceased to be the line's terminal.

New York City councilmember Lincoln Restler founded a volunteer group, the Friends of MTA Station Group, in early 2023 to advocate for improvements to the Nassau Avenue station and four other subway stations in Brooklyn. In 2026, the MTA announced that it would make the Nassau Avenue station ADA-accessible with elevators. The developers of the nearby Monitor Point complex had agreed to provide funding for the accessibility project, along with guaranteeing the completion of the nearby Bushwick Inlet Park, in exchange for a zoning bonus permitting additional floor area at the development.

== Station layout ==
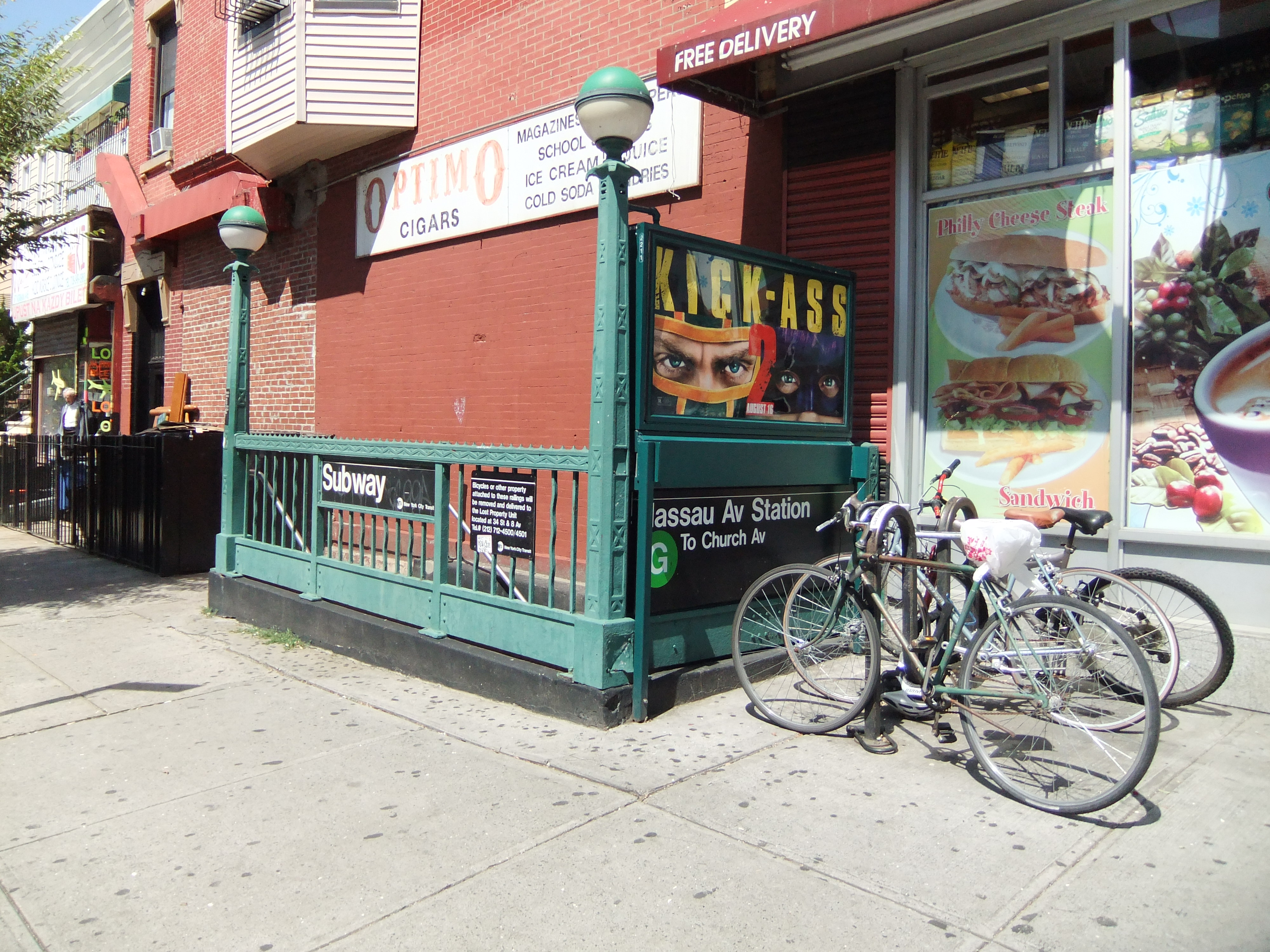
Station stair with bike racks

This underground station has two tracks and two side platforms. The G stops at the station at all times. The station is between Greenpoint Avenue to the north and Metropolitan Avenue to the south.

Both platforms have a green trim line with a black border and mosaic name tablets reading "NASSAU AVE." in white sans-serif lettering on a black background and green border. Small "NASSAU" tile captions in white lettering on a black background run directly below the trim line and directional signs in the same style are below some of the name tablets. The tiles were part of a color-coded tile system used throughout the IND. The tile colors were designed to facilitate navigation for travelers going away from Lower Manhattan. Because the Crosstown Line does not merge into a line that enters Manhattan at either end, all stations on the line had green tiles. Green I-beam columns run along both platforms at regular intervals with alternating ones having the standard black name plate in white lettering.

North of the station is a diamond crossover switch, allowing terminating trains to reverse direction. These switches were used in regular service until July 1, 1937, when the remainder of the Crosstown Line opened. Prior to that, Nassau Avenue was the line's southern terminus. South of the station, the line shifts from Manhattan Avenue onto Union Avenue, running diagonally under McCarren Park.

=== Exits ===
The station's full-time fare control is at the south end, which is the more heavily used of the station's two entry-exit points. A short staircase from each platform goes up to mezzanine level. On the Church Avenue-bound side, one exit-only turnstile and one High Entry/Exit Turnstile leads to two staircases going up to either western corners of Manhattan and Nassau Avenues. The Queens-bound side has the station's full-time turnstile bank, token booth, and two staircases going up to either eastern corners of the same intersection. A raised crossover connects the two sides both inside and outside fare control and is split in two by a steel fence. The mezzanine has mosaic directional signs in white lettering on a green background. G trains, which are about half the length of the 600-foot (180 m) platform, stop near the south end of the station.

Both platforms have an unstaffed platform-level fare control at their north end, with no crossover. On the Church Avenue-bound side, one exit-only turnstile and one High Entry/Exit Turnstile lead to a single staircase going up to the northwest corner of Norman and Manhattan Avenues. On the Queens-bound side, a single full-height turnstile leads to a staircase going up to the northeast corner of the same intersection.

In preparation for the 14th Street Tunnel shutdown in 2019, it was initially planned to reconfigure the split free/paid area at the south end of the station into an exclusively unpaid area. This would have removed the free transfer between platforms, but would have allowed for increased flow from passengers entering and exiting the station. Though this was not done, a project to replace high-entry/exit turnstiles at the station with four low turnstiles was completed in January 2019.
