= List of New York City Subway stations in Brooklyn =

The current New York City Transit Authority rail system map; Brooklyn is located on the bottom-center portion of the map.

The New York City Subway is a rapid transit system that serves four of the five boroughs of New York City in the U.S. state of New York: the Bronx, Brooklyn, Manhattan, and Queens. Operated by the New York City Transit Authority under the Metropolitan Transportation Authority of New York, the New York City Subway is the busiest rapid transit system in the United States and among the 20 busiest in the world. The system's 472 stations qualifies it to have the largest number of rapid transit stations in the world.

Three rapid transit companies merged in 1940 to create the present New York City Subway system: the Interborough Rapid Transit Company (IRT), the Brooklyn–Manhattan Transit Corporation (BMT), and the Independent Subway System (IND). All three former systems are present in Brooklyn.

== History ==
The vast majority of current subway lines in Brooklyn trace their lineage back to the Brooklyn–Manhattan Transit (BMT) and Brooklyn Rapid Transit (BRT), as well as earlier predecessors. The oldest right-of-way in the entire subway system is that of the West End Line. Its right-of-way began passenger service on October 9, 1863, as a surface steam railroad called the Brooklyn, Bath and Coney Island. It was later rebuilt under the Dual Contracts, opening as the current elevated road on June 24, 1916. The West End line is not the oldest elevated in Brooklyn. That honor goes to the BMT Jamaica Line with the section from Gates Avenue to Van Siclen Avenue to an opening on May 13, 1885. The oldest un-rebuilt section still in use, is from Alabama Avenue to Cypress Hills. That section opened between September 5, 1885, and May 30, 1893. Both segments were originally part of the demolished BMT Lexington Avenue Line. The rest of the line from Marcy Avenue to Broadway Junction was rebuilt during the Dual Contracts. It was also extended past Cypress Hills towards Jamaica, Queens during that time.

Similar histories to the BMT West End Line can be found with the BMT Sea Beach Line (New York and Sea Beach Railroad), and BMT Culver Line (Prospect Park and Coney Island Railroad). Other truncated lines dating back to the same period as the Jamaica and Lexington Els are the Myrtle Avenue and BMT Fulton Street Lines.

Both the BMT Franklin Avenue Line and BMT Brighton Line began as another excursion railroad to Coney Island called the Brooklyn, Flatbush and Coney Island Railway. Originating on July 2, 1878, the BF&CI ran from the former Bedford Station on the Atlantic Branch of the Long Island Rail Road, to Brighton Beach. It also had a spur to the Sheepshead Bay Race Track southeast of Neck Road. Losing their connection to the LIRR in 1893, the railroad almost collapsed until it was acquired by the Kings County Elevated Railway in 1896, which electrified the line by 1899 for both rapid transit and streetcar lines, and itself became part of Brooklyn Rapid Transit in 1900. Grade elimination projects took place during the mid-1900s and late-1910s. A subway connection between Prospect Park and DeKalb Avenue on the BMT Fourth Avenue Line was completed by 1920.

The BMT Canarsie Line began on October 21, 1865, as the Brooklyn and Rockaway Beach Railroad, a surface steam excursion railroad line for beachgoers. Once acquired by the BRT in 1906, it was split between a mostly elevated rapid transit line from Rockaway Boulevard and Broadway Junction, and the Canarsie Shuttle streetcar line south of Rockaway Boulevard to Jamaica Bay by 1920. A subway extension to Manhattan from Broadway Junction known as the "14th Street–Eastern District Line" was built in 1928. The Liberty Avenue extension of the Fulton Street Elevated opened on September 25, 1915, and the extension of the Jamaica Avenue Elevated to Walnut Street opened on May 28, 1917. A further extension of the latter line opened to Cliffside Avenue on July 2, 1918.

Also on June 22, 1915, the BRT opened the Fourth Avenue Subway from Myrtle Avenue to 59th Street as well as the BMT Sea Beach Line, which provided service to Coney Island. The Fourth Avenue Line was then extended the line south to 86th Street in Bay Ridge on January 15, 1916. The West End Line opened in stages. The line opened from Ninth Avenue to 18th Avenue on June 24, 1916, to 25th Avenue on July 29, 1916, and to Coney Island on July 21, 1917. Culver Line service was inaugurated on March 16, 1919, to Kings Highway. Service was extended to Avenue X on May 10, 1919, before running through to Coney Island on May 1, 1920. The Montague Street Tunnel opened on August 1, 1920, connecting Brooklyn directly to Lower Manhattan. On the same date, the connection between the Brighton Line connection between Prospect Park and DeKalb Avenue was opened. Two additional stations along the Fourth Avenue Line were opened at a later date by the BMT. An in-fill station, Lawrence Street, was opened in Downtown Brooklyn on June 11, 1924, and the line was extended to its new terminal at 95th Street in Fort Hamilton on October 31, 1925. The Fourth Avenue Line would replace the elevated BMT Fifth Avenue Line on June 1, 1940, and inherited the connections to the West End and Sea Beach Lines. The Myrtle Avenue station was closed in 1956 as part of the reconstruction of the DeKalb Avenue junction.

Besides the BMT and its predecessors, the Interborough Rapid Transit Company expanded two subways and one elevated line into Brooklyn. The Eastern Parkway Line was built under Brooklyn Borough Hall to Atlantic Avenue in 1908 and then to Utica Avenue in Crown Heights in 1920. This line is fed from Manhattan by the IRT Lexington Avenue Line via the Joralemon Street Tunnel as well as the Brooklyn Branch of the IRT Broadway–Seventh Avenue Line through the Clark Street Tunnel. Additionally, two extensions from the Eastern Parkway Line was built in 1920. The first being the Nostrand Avenue Line from the Brooklyn Botanic Garden to Flatbush Avenue in Flatbush. The second was the elevated New Lots Line, over East 98th Street and Livonia Avenue in Brownsville and East New York to Pennsylvania Avenue, and was expanded to New Lots Avenue in 1922.

In 1933, the city-owned Independent Subway System built the IND Crosstown Line from Court Square in Long Island City south to Nassau Avenue in Greenpoint, and then from Metropolitan Avenue in Williamsburg to Hoyt and Schermerhorn Streets in Downtown Brooklyn. Additionally, in 1933, they built IND Brooklyn Line from Jay Street–Borough Hall to Church Avenue station. Three years later, the IND Sixth Avenue Line was connected to Jay Street through the Rutgers Street Tunnel. The connecting ramps between Church Avenue and Ditmas Avenue on the BMT Culver Line did not exist until 1954, and once they did, the Culver Line was "recaptured" by the IND, with them except for the Culver Shuttle northwest to Ninth Avenue on the BMT West End Line. This segment of the BMT Culver Line was abandoned on May 10, 1975. The newest line in Brooklyn is the ramp from the IND Fulton Street Subway connecting with the former BMT Fulton Street elevated which opened on April 29, 1956. This ramp includes a connection to Pitkin Yard and the Grant Avenue station.

== Description ==
There are 170 New York City Subway stations in Brooklyn (171 if 75th Street–Elderts Lane, which is located in both Brooklyn and Queens, is included). When interchange stations with two or more non-adjacent platforms are counted as one station, the number of stations is 157. The physical trackage lines within Brooklyn include:

- IRT Broadway–Seventh Avenue Line
- IRT Eastern Parkway Line
- IRT New Lots Line
- IRT Nostrand Avenue Line
- BMT Brighton Line
- BMT Canarsie Line
- BMT Fourth Avenue Line
- BMT Franklin Avenue Line
- BMT Jamaica Line
- BMT Myrtle Avenue Line
- BMT Sea Beach Line
- BMT West End Line
- IND Crosstown Line
- IND Culver Line
- IND Eighth Avenue Line
- IND Fulton Street Line
- IND Sixth Avenue Line

== Lines and services ==
There are 170 New York City Subway stations in Brooklyn, per the official count of the Metropolitan Transportation Authority; of these, 22 are express-local stations. If the 10 station complexes are counted as one station each, the number of stations is 157. In the table below, lines with colors next to them indicate trunk lines, which determine the colors that are used for services' route bullets and diamonds. The opening date refers to the opening of the first section of track for the line. In the "division" column, the current division is followed by the original division in parentheses.

Division	Line	Services	Stations in Brooklyn	Opened	Continues to
B (BMT)	Fourth Avenue Line	"D" train "N" train "R" train "W" train	16 (3 express-local stations, 4 part of station complexes, 1 shared with Brighton Line)	June 22, 1915	Manhattan
B (IND)	Sixth Avenue Line	"F" train "F" express train	1	April 9, 1936	Manhattan
B (IND)	Eighth Avenue Line	"A" train "C" train	1	February 1, 1933	Manhattan
B (BMT)	Brighton Line	"B" train "Q" train	20 (6 express-local stations (1 shared with Franklin Avenue Line), 1 part of a station complex, 1 shared with Fourth Avenue Line, 1 shared with Culver Line, 1 shared with Culver, Sea Beach, and West End Lines)	July 2, 1878	Manhattan
A (IRT)	Broadway–Seventh Avenue Line	"2" train "3" train	2 (1 part of a station complex)	April 15, 1919	Manhattan
B (BMT)	Canarsie Line	"L" train	19 (3 part of station complexes)	July 28, 1906	Manhattan
B (IND)	Crosstown Line	"G" train	11 (1 part of a station complex, 1 shared with Fulton Street Line)	August 19, 1933	Queens
B (IND)	Culver Line	"F" train "F" express train "G" train	21 (2 part of station complexes, 1 shared with Fulton Street Line, 1 shared with Brighton Line, 1 shared with Brighton, Sea Beach & West End Lines)	March 16, 1919	—N/a
A (IRT)	Eastern Parkway Line	"2" train "3" train "4" train "5" train	11 (4 express-local stations, 3 part of station complexes)	January 9, 1908	Manhattan
B (BMT)	Franklin Avenue Line	Franklin Avenue Shuttle	4 (2 part of station complexes, 1 shared with Brighton Line)	August 18, 1878	—N/a
B (IND)	Fulton Street Line	"A" train "C" train	16 (5 express-local stations, 3 part of station complexes, 1 shared with Culver Line, 1 shared with Crosstown Line)	April 9, 1936	Queens
B (BMT)	Jamaica Line	"J" train "M" train "Z" train	16 (4 express-local stations, (Note: As the J/Z combined in a skip-stop service, an "express-local" station in this sense means both services stop at the station during the hours of skip-stop operation. 2 of the express-local stations on the Jamaica line fit this definition.) 1 part of a station complex)	June 25, 1888	Manhattan, Queens
B (BMT)	Myrtle Avenue Line	"M" train	3 (1 part of a station complex)	April 10, 1888	Queens
A (IRT)	New Lots Line	(Note: The 2 and 5 operate limited services on the IRT New Lots Line during rush hours.)	7	November 22, 1920	—N/a
A (IRT)	Nostrand Avenue Line	"2" train "5" train	7	August 23, 1920	—N/a
B (BMT)	Sea Beach Line	"N" train "W" train	10 (1 part of a station complex, 1 shared with Brighton, Culver & West End Lines)	June 22, 1915	—N/a
B (BMT)	West End Line	"D" train "R" train "W" train	13 (1 part of a station complex, 1 shared with Brighton, Culver & Sea Beach Lines)	June 24, 1916	—N/a

== Stations ==
Permanently closed subway stations, including those that have been demolished, are not included in the list below. The 95th Street station is listed under "Bay Ridge–95th Street."

Station service legend
Stops all times	Stops 24 hours a day
Stops all times except late nights	Stops every day during daytime hours only
Stops late nights only	Stops every day during overnight hours only
Stops weekdays during the day	Stops during weekday daytime hours only
Stops all times except rush hours in the peak direction	Stops 24 hours a day, except during weekday rush hours in the peak direction
Stops daily except rush hours in the peak direction	Stops every day during daytime hours, except during weekday rush hours in the peak direction
Stops rush hours only	Stops during weekday rush hours only
Stops rush hours in the peak direction only	Stops during weekday rush hours in the peak direction only
Time period details
Disabled access	Station is compliant with the Americans with Disabilities Act
↑	Station is compliant with the Americans with Disabilities Act in the indicated direction only
↓	Station is compliant with the Americans with Disabilities Act in the indicated direction only
	Elevator access to mezzanine only

*	Station is part of a station complex
**	Transfer stations either between local and express services or that involve the terminus of a service on the same line; may also be part of a station complex as defined above
***	Multi-level or adjacent-platform transfer stations on different lines considered to be one station as classified by the MTA
†	Terminal of a service
*†, **† or ***†	Transfer stations and terminals
‡	Last station in Brooklyn before service continues to Manhattan or Queens
*‡, **‡, or ***‡	Last station in Brooklyn and a transfer station
*†‡, **†‡, or ***†‡	Last station in Brooklyn, a transfer station and a terminal

Station	Disabled access	Division	Line	Services	Opened
Fourth Avenue* (Note: The 2 platform sets of the Fourth Avenue/Ninth Street station complex count as one station when compared to international standards.)		B (IND)	Culver Line	F G	October 7, 1933
Seventh Avenue		B (BMT)	Brighton Line	B Q	August 1, 1920
Seventh Avenue	Disabled access	B (IND)	Culver Line	F <F> G	October 7, 1933
Eighth Avenue	Disabled access	B (BMT)	Sea Beach Line	N W	June 22, 1915
Ninth Avenue		B (BMT)	West End Line	D R W	June 24, 1916
Ninth Street*		B (BMT)	Fourth Avenue Line	D N R W	June 22, 1915
15th Street–Prospect Park		B (IND)	Culver Line	F G	October 7, 1933
18th Avenue		B (IND)	Culver Line	F <F>	March 16, 1919
18th Avenue		B (BMT)	Sea Beach Line	N W	June 22, 1915
18th Avenue		B (BMT)	West End Line	D	June 24, 1916
20th Avenue		B (BMT)	Sea Beach Line	N W	June 22, 1915
20th Avenue		B (BMT)	West End Line	D	July 29, 1916
25th Avenue		B (BMT)	West End Line	D	July 29, 1916
25th Street		B (BMT)	Fourth Avenue Line	D N R W	June 22, 1915
36th Street**		B (BMT)	Fourth Avenue Line	D N R W	June 22, 1915
45th Street		B (BMT)	Fourth Avenue Line	N R W	September 22, 1915
50th Street		B (BMT)	West End Line	D	June 24, 1916
53rd Street		B (BMT)	Fourth Avenue Line	N R W	September 22, 1915
55th Street		B (BMT)	West End Line	D	June 24, 1916
59th Street**	Disabled access	B (BMT)	Fourth Avenue Line	N R W	June 22, 1915
62nd Street* (Note: The 2 platform sets of the New Utrecht Avenue/62nd Street station complex count as one station when compared to international standards.)	Disabled access	B (BMT)	West End Line	D R W	June 24, 1916
71st Street		B (BMT)	West End Line	D	June 24, 1916
77th Street		B (BMT)	Fourth Avenue Line	R	January 15, 1916
79th Street		B (BMT)	West End Line	D	June 24, 1916
86th Street	Disabled access	B (BMT)	Fourth Avenue Line	R	January 15, 1916
86th Street		B (BMT)	Sea Beach Line	N W	June 22, 1915
Alabama Avenue		B (BMT)	Jamaica Line	J Z	December 21, 1916
Atlantic Avenue		B (BMT)	Canarsie Line	L	July 28, 1906
Atlantic Avenue–Barclays Center* (Note: The 3 platform sets of the Atlantic Avenue–Barclays Center station complex count as one station when compared to international standards.)	Disabled access	B (BMT)	Brighton Line	B Q	August 1, 1920
Atlantic Avenue–Barclays Center** (Note: At the Atlantic Avenue–Barclays Center Eastern Parkway Line station, the single inner island platform for express trains is separated from the two outer side platforms for local trains. Transfers between local and express trains can be done by walking through a crossunder, but it is more convenient to do so at either Nevins Street or Franklin Avenue.)	Disabled access	A (IRT)	Eastern Parkway Line	2; 3; 4; 5	May 1, 1908
Atlantic Avenue–Barclays Center**‡	Disabled access	B (BMT)	Fourth Avenue Line	D N R W	June 22, 1915
Avenue H	Disabled access	B (BMT)	Brighton Line	Q	1907
Avenue I		B (IND)	Culver Line	F <F>	March 16, 1919
Avenue J		B (BMT)	Brighton Line	Q	1907
Avenue M		B (BMT)	Brighton Line	Q	1907
Avenue N		B (IND)	Culver Line	F <F>	March 16, 1919
Avenue P		B (IND)	Culver Line	F <F>	March 16, 1919
Avenue U		B (BMT)	Brighton Line	Q	1907
Avenue U		B (IND)	Culver Line	F <F>	May 10, 1919
Avenue U		B (BMT)	Sea Beach Line	N W	June 22, 1915
Avenue X		B (IND)	Culver Line	F <F>	May 10, 1919
Bay 50th Street		B (BMT)	West End Line	D	July 21, 1917
Bay Parkway		B (IND)	Culver Line	F <F>	March 16, 1919
Bay Parkway		B (BMT)	Sea Beach Line	N W	June 22, 1915
Bay Parkway	Disabled access	B (BMT)	West End Line	D R W	July 29, 1916
Bay Ridge Avenue		B (BMT)	Fourth Avenue Line	R	January 15, 1916
Bay Ridge–95th Street†	Disabled access	B (BMT)	Fourth Avenue Line	R	October 31, 1925
Bedford Avenue‡	Disabled access	B (BMT)	Canarsie Line	L	June 30, 1924
Bedford–Nostrand Avenues		B (IND)	Crosstown Line	G	July 1, 1937
Bergen Street		B (IND)	Culver Line	F <F> G	March 20, 1933
Bergen Street		A (IRT)	Eastern Parkway Line	2; 3; 4	October 10, 1920
Beverley Road		B (BMT)	Brighton Line	Q	1907
Beverly Road		A (IRT)	Nostrand Avenue Line	2; 5	August 23, 1920
Borough Hall* (Note: The 3 platform sets of the Borough Hall/Court Street station complex count as one station when compared to international standards.)	Disabled access	A (IRT)	Broadway–Seventh Avenue Line	2; 3	April 15, 1919
Borough Hall*‡	Disabled access	A (IRT)	Eastern Parkway Line	4; 5	January 9, 1908
Botanic Garden* (Note: The 2 platform sets of the Franklin Avenue/Botanic Garden station complex count as one station when compared to international standards.)		B (BMT)	Franklin Avenue Line	S	September 30, 1928
Brighton Beach**†		B (BMT)	Brighton Line	B Q	April 22, 1917
Broadway		B (IND)	Crosstown Line	G	July 1, 1937
Broadway Junction* (Note: The 3 platform sets of the Broadway Junction station complex count as one station when compared to international standards.)		B (BMT)	Canarsie Line	L	July 14, 1928
Broadway Junction**		B (IND)	Fulton Street Line	A C	December 30, 1946
Broadway Junction**		B (BMT)	Jamaica Line	J Z	December 21, 1916
Bushwick Avenue–Aberdeen Street		B (BMT)	Canarsie Line	L	July 14, 1928
Canarsie–Rockaway Parkway†	Disabled access	B (BMT)	Canarsie Line	L	July 28, 1906
Carroll Street		B (IND)	Culver Line	F G	October 7, 1933
Central Avenue		B (BMT)	Myrtle Avenue Line	M	July 29, 1914
Chauncey Street		B (BMT)	Jamaica Line	J Z	December 21, 1916
Church Avenue**	Disabled access	B (BMT)	Brighton Line	B Q	September 26, 1919
Church Avenue**†	Disabled access	B (IND)	Culver Line	F <F> G	October 7, 1933
Church Avenue	Disabled access	A (IRT)	Nostrand Avenue Line	2; 5	August 23, 1920
Clark Street‡		A (IRT)	Broadway–Seventh Avenue Line	2; 3	April 15, 1919
Classon Avenue		B (IND)	Crosstown Line	G	July 1, 1937
Cleveland Street		B (BMT)	Jamaica Line	J	May 30, 1893
Clinton–Washington Avenues		B (IND)	Crosstown Line	G	July 1, 1937
Clinton–Washington Avenues		B (IND)	Fulton Street Line	A C	April 9, 1936
Coney Island–Stillwell Avenue***†	Disabled access	B (BMT, IND)	Brighton Line, Culver Line, Sea Beach Line, West End Line	D F <F> N Q	June 22, 1915
Cortelyou Road		B (BMT)	Brighton Line	Q	1907
Court Street*‡		B (BMT)	Fourth Avenue Line	N R W	August 1, 1920
Crescent Street**		B (BMT)	Jamaica Line	J Z	May 30, 1893
Crown Heights–Utica Avenue**†	Disabled access	A (IRT)	Eastern Parkway Line	2; 3; 4; 5	August 23, 1920
Cypress Hills‡		B (BMT)	Jamaica Line	J	May 28, 1917
DeKalb Avenue***‡	Disabled access	B (BMT)	Fourth Avenue Line, Brighton Line	B D N Q R W	June 22, 1915
DeKalb Avenue		B (BMT)	Canarsie Line	L	July 14, 1928
Ditmas Avenue		B (IND)	Culver Line	F <F>	March 16, 1919
East 105th Street		B (BMT)	Canarsie Line	L	July 28, 1906
Eastern Parkway–Brooklyn Museum	Disabled access	A (IRT)	Eastern Parkway Line	2; 3; 4	October 10, 1920
Euclid Avenue**†	Disabled access	B (IND)	Fulton Street Line	A C	November 28, 1948
Flatbush Avenue–Brooklyn College†	Disabled access	A (IRT)	Nostrand Avenue Line	2; 5	August 23, 1920
Flushing Avenue		B (IND)	Crosstown Line	G	July 1, 1937
Flushing Avenue	Disabled access	B (BMT)	Jamaica Line	J M	January 17, 1916
Fort Hamilton Parkway		B (IND)	Culver Line	F G	October 7, 1933
Fort Hamilton Parkway		B (BMT)	Sea Beach Line	N W	June 22, 1915
Fort Hamilton Parkway		B (BMT)	West End Line	D	June 24, 1916
Franklin Avenue*† (Note: The 2 platform sets of the Franklin Avenue station complex count as one station when compared to international standards.)	Disabled access	B (BMT)	Franklin Avenue Line	S	August 15, 1896
Franklin Avenue*	Disabled access	B (IND)	Fulton Street Line	A C	April 9, 1936
Franklin Avenue–Medgar Evers College*		A (IRT)	Eastern Parkway Line	2; 3; 4; 5	August 23, 1920
Fulton Street		B (IND)	Crosstown Line	G	July 1, 1937
Gates Avenue		B (BMT)	Jamaica Line	J Z	December 21, 1916
Graham Avenue		B (BMT)	Canarsie Line	L	June 30, 1924
Grand Army Plaza		A (IRT)	Eastern Parkway Line	2; 3; 4	October 10, 1920
Grand Street	Disabled access	B (BMT)	Canarsie Line	L	June 30, 1924
Grant Avenue‡		B (IND)	Fulton Street Line	A	April 29, 1956
Greenpoint Avenue‡	Disabled access	B (IND)	Crosstown Line	G	August 19, 1933
Halsey Street		B (BMT)	Canarsie Line	L	July 14, 1928
Halsey Street		B (BMT)	Jamaica Line	J	December 21, 1916
Hewes Street		B (BMT)	Jamaica Line	J M	January 17, 1916
High Street‡		B (IND)	Eighth Avenue Line	A C	February 1, 1933
Hoyt Street	↓	A (IRT)	Eastern Parkway Line	2; 3	May 1, 1908
Hoyt–Schermerhorn Streets***		B (IND)	Crosstown Line, Fulton Street Line	A C G	April 9, 1936
Jay Street–MetroTech*** (Note: The 2 platform sets of the Jay Street–MetroTech station complex count as one station when compared to international standards.)	Disabled access	B (IND)	Culver Line, Fulton Street Line	A C F <F>	February 1, 1933
Jay Street–MetroTech*	Disabled access	B (BMT)	Fourth Avenue Line	N R W	June 11, 1924
Jefferson Street		B (BMT)	Canarsie Line	L	July 14, 1928
Junius Street		A (IRT)	New Lots Line	2; 3; 4; 5	November 22, 1920
Kings Highway**	Disabled access	B (BMT)	Brighton Line	B Q	1907
Kings Highway**†	Disabled access	B (IND)	Culver Line	F <F>	March 16, 1919
Kings Highway		B (BMT)	Sea Beach Line	N W	June 22, 1915
Kingston Avenue		A (IRT)	Eastern Parkway Line	2; 3; 4; 5	August 23, 1920
Kingston–Throop Avenues		B (IND)	Fulton Street Line	A C	April 9, 1936
Knickerbocker Avenue		B (BMT)	Myrtle Avenue Line	M	August 15, 1889
Kosciuszko Street		B (BMT)	Jamaica Line	J	December 21, 1916
Lafayette Avenue		B (IND)	Fulton Street Line	A C	April 9, 1936
Liberty Avenue		B (IND)	Fulton Street Line	A C	November 28, 1948
Livonia Avenue	Disabled access	B (BMT)	Canarsie Line	L	July 28, 1906
Lorimer Street* (Note: The 2 platform sets of the Metropolitan Avenue/Lorimer Street station complex count as one station when compared to international standards.)	Disabled access	B (BMT)	Canarsie Line	L	June 30, 1924
Lorimer Street		B (BMT)	Jamaica Line	J M	January 17, 1916
Marcy Avenue‡	Disabled access	B (BMT)	Jamaica Line	J M Z	September 16, 1908
Metropolitan Avenue*	Disabled access	B (IND)	Crosstown Line	G	July 1, 1937
Montrose Avenue		B (BMT)	Canarsie Line	L	June 10, 1924
Morgan Avenue		B (BMT)	Canarsie Line	L	July 14, 1928
Myrtle Avenue**†		B (BMT)	Jamaica Line	J M Z	January 17, 1916
Myrtle–Willoughby Avenues		B (IND)	Crosstown Line	G	July 1, 1937
Myrtle–Wyckoff Avenues* (Note: The 2 platform sets of the Myrtle–Wyckoff Avenues station complex count as one station when compared to international standards.)	Disabled access	B (BMT)	Canarsie Line	L	July 14, 1928
Myrtle–Wyckoff Avenues*‡	Disabled access	B (BMT)	Myrtle Avenue Line	M	February 22, 1915
Nassau Avenue		B (IND)	Crosstown Line	G	August 19, 1933
Neck Road		B (BMT)	Brighton Line	Q	1907
Neptune Avenue		B (IND)	Culver Line	F <F>	May 1, 1920
Nevins Street**		A (IRT)	Eastern Parkway Line	2; 3; 4; 5	May 1, 1908
New Lots Avenue		B (BMT)	Canarsie Line	L	July 28, 1906
New Lots Avenue†		A (IRT)	New Lots Line	2; 3; 4; 5	October 16, 1922
New Utrecht Avenue*	Disabled access	B (BMT)	Sea Beach Line	N W	June 22, 1915
Newkirk Avenue–Little Haiti		A (IRT)	Nostrand Avenue Line	2; 5	August 23, 1920
Newkirk Plaza**		B (BMT)	Brighton Line	B Q	1907
Norwood Avenue		B (BMT)	Jamaica Line	J Z	June 30, 1893
Nostrand Avenue		A (IRT)	Eastern Parkway Line	2; 3; 4; 5	August 23, 1920
Nostrand Avenue**		B (IND)	Fulton Street Line	A C	April 9, 1936
Ocean Parkway		B (BMT)	Brighton Line	Q	April 22, 1917
Park Place	Disabled access	B (BMT)	Franklin Avenue Line	S	June 19, 1899
Parkside Avenue		B (BMT)	Brighton Line	Q	September 26, 1919
Pennsylvania Avenue		A (IRT)	New Lots Line	2; 3; 4; 5	December 24, 1920
President Street–Medgar Evers College		A (IRT)	Nostrand Avenue Line	2; 5	August 23, 1920
Prospect Avenue		B (BMT)	Fourth Avenue Line	D N R W	June 22, 1915
Prospect Park***†	Disabled access	B (BMT)	Brighton Line, Franklin Avenue Line	B Q S	September 26, 1919
Ralph Avenue		B (IND)	Fulton Street Line	A C	April 9, 1936
Rockaway Avenue		B (IND)	Fulton Street Line	A C	April 9, 1936
Rockaway Avenue		A (IRT)	New Lots Line	2; 3; 4; 5	November 22, 1920
Saratoga Avenue		A (IRT)	New Lots Line	2; 3; 4; 5	November 22, 1920
Sheepshead Bay**	Disabled access	B (BMT)	Brighton Line	B Q	1907
Shepherd Avenue		B (IND)	Fulton Street Line	A C	November 28, 1948
Smith–Ninth Streets		B (IND)	Culver Line	F G	October 7, 1933
Sterling Street		A (IRT)	Nostrand Avenue Line	2; 5	August 23, 1920
Sutter Avenue		B (BMT)	Canarsie Line	L	July 28, 1906
Sutter Avenue–Rutland Road		A (IRT)	New Lots Line	2; 3; 4; 5	November 22, 1920
Union Street		B (BMT)	Fourth Avenue Line	D N R W	June 22, 1915
Utica Avenue**	Disabled access	B (IND)	Fulton Street Line	A C	April 9, 1936
Van Siclen Avenue		B (IND)	Fulton Street Line	A C	November 28, 1948
Van Siclen Avenue		B (BMT)	Jamaica Line	J Z	December 3, 1885
Van Siclen Avenue		A (IRT)	New Lots Line	2; 3; 4; 5	October 16, 1922
West Eighth Street–New York Aquarium***		B (BMT, IND)	Brighton Line, Culver Line	F <F> Q	May 30, 1917
Wilson Avenue	↑	B (BMT)	Canarsie Line	L	July 14, 1928
Winthrop Street		A (IRT)	Nostrand Avenue Line	2; 5	August 23, 1920
York Street‡		B (IND)	Sixth Avenue Line	F <F>	April 9, 1936

== See also ==
- New York City Subway stations
- List of New York City Subway stations
- List of New York City Subway transfer stations
- List of New York City Subway terminals
- List of closed New York City Subway stations
- List of Staten Island Railway stations
- Accessibility of the Metropolitan Transportation Authority
- List of New York City Subway stations in the Bronx
- List of New York City Subway stations in Manhattan
- List of New York City Subway stations in Queens
