= Flushing Avenue (disambiguation) =

Flushing Avenue may refer to:

- Flushing Avenue, a street running through northern Brooklyn and west central Queens

== New York City Subway stations ==
- Flushing Avenue (BMT Jamaica Line), serving the J and M trains
- Flushing Avenue (IND Crosstown Line), serving the G train
