= G (New York City Subway service) =

Rapid transit service

- Brooklyn-Queens Crosstown

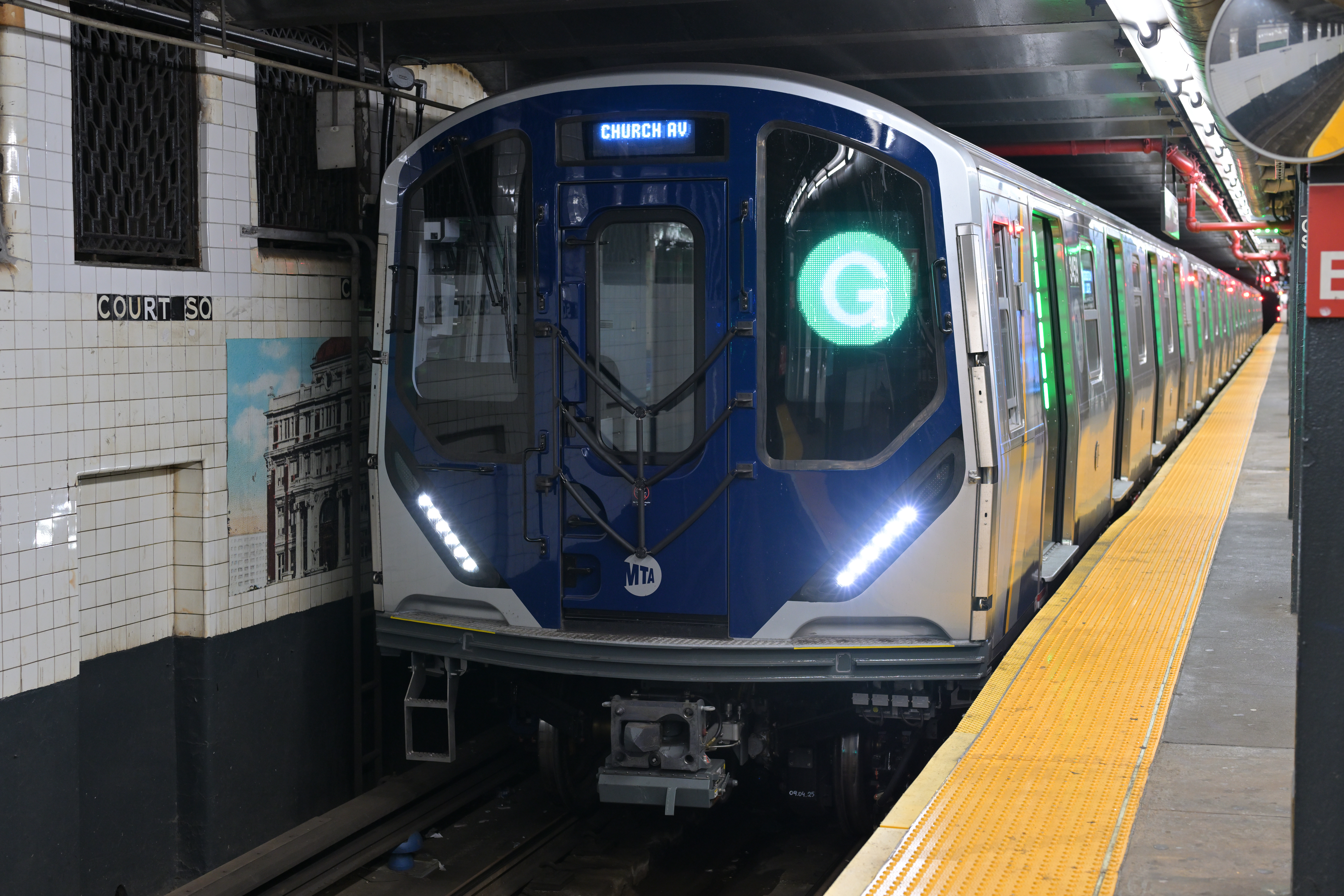
- A G train of R211As at Court Square

- Northern end: Court Square
- Southern end: Church Avenue
- Stations: 21
- Rolling stock: R211A; R211T (Rolling stock assignments subject to change)
- Depot: Coney Island Yard (fleet); Jamaica Yard (Operations)
- Started service: August 19, 1933; 93 years ago

The G Brooklyn-Queens Crosstown is an 11.4-mile-long (18.3 km) rapid transit service in the B Division of the New York City Subway. Its route emblem, or "bullet", is colored light green since it serves the IND Crosstown Line.

The G operates 24 hours daily between Court Square in Long Island City, Queens, and Church Avenue in Kensington, Brooklyn and makes all stops along the full route. It is the only non-shuttle service in the system that does not serve the borough of Manhattan. The G serves two stations in Queens—Court Square and 21st Street, both in Long Island City. Prior to 2010, it served the IND Queens Boulevard Line between Court Square and 71st Avenue in Forest Hills. In 1939 and 1940, the then-designated GG also used the now-demolished IND World's Fair Line to access the 1939 New York World's Fair. The GG, which became the G in 1985, had its southern terminal at Smith–Ninth Streets from 1976 to 2009.

In the 21st century, the G suffered from a wide range of issues that has resulted in complaints by people living along the route. These issues included an inadequacy of transfers to other services; the lack of direct service to Manhattan; short train lengths; and low frequencies. Since the 2000s, several improvements have been made to the G, including a route extension in Brooklyn and a full-route audit in 2013 that identified solutions for issues on the G service. As of 2023, additional improvements are planned for the G route, including the automation of the entire route. The G has a weekday ridership of 166,000.

== History ==
=== Early service ===
The original Brooklyn–Queens Crosstown Local service began on August 19, 1933, as a shuttle between Queens Plaza on the IND Queens Boulevard Line and Nassau Avenue. This service was designated GG because the IND used double letters to indicate local service. Starting on April 24, 1937, GG trains were extended to Forest Hills–71st Avenue during rush hours, serving as the Queens Boulevard local while E trains ran express west of 71st Avenue. The entire IND Crosstown Line was completed on July 1, 1937, including the connection to the IND Culver Line (then the South Brooklyn Line) at Bergen Street. Although some retrospective accounts have intimated that GG service initially ran at all times between Forest Hills–71st Avenue and Church Avenue before being truncated, a contemporaneous article from The New York Times reported that the Smith–Ninth Streets station served as the GG's original Brooklyn terminus.

From April 30 to November 1, 1939, and from May 11 to October 28, 1940, GG trains were extended via the temporary IND World's Fair Line to World's Fair Station at Horace Harding Boulevard at all times during the 1939–1940 World's Fair. Trains were marked as S Special. The fair closed on October 28, 1940, with the station and line being demolished later that year. As a result, GG service was truncated to Forest Hills–71st Avenue. Additional GG service was briefly provided for the 1964 New York World's Fair, running nonstop between Hoyt–Schermerhorn Streets station and Roosevelt Avenue every 30 minutes between 10 a.m. and 3:30 pm. It took 23 minutes for trains to travel between the two stations.

=== 1960s to 1990s ===
On August 19, 1968, service was extended to Church Avenue during rush hours to allow for the introduction of F express service on the IND Culver Line. Since riders at local stations complained about the loss of direct service to Manhattan, F trains to and from Kings Highway began making local stops. All peak-direction F trains began running local on January 19, 1976. On August 30, 1976, due to budget cuts, remaining F express service north of Church Avenue was eliminated and GG service was cut back to Smith–Ninth Streets. On January 24, 1977, as part of a series of NYCTA service cuts to save $13 million, many subway lines began running shorter trains again during middays. As part of the change, GG trains began running with four cars between 9:30 a.m. and 1:30 pm. On August 27, 1977, GG service was cut back to Queens Plaza during late nights, and local service along Queens Boulevard was provided by the F. Effective May 6, 1985, use of double letters to indicate local service was discontinued, so the GG was relabeled G.

Afterwards, as part of the New York City Transit Authority's proposed service plan to serve the new Archer Avenue Line upper level, the G would have been extended to Jamaica Center during weekends and evenings when N trains terminated at 71st Avenue or 57th Street–Seventh Avenue. During late nights, a G train shuttle would have run between Jamaica Center and Van Wyck Boulevard. On weekdays, the extension would have been served by N trains. This service plan would have allowed E and F trains to remain on the Queens Boulevard mainline toward 179th Street. The final service plan, which took effect on December 11, 1988, had the extension served by E trains, with R trains extended to 179th Street.

On May 24, 1987, the N and R services switched terminals in Queens. As part of the reroute plan, Queens Plaza became the northern terminal for the G train on evenings, weekends, and late nights. Three years later, on September 30, 1990, G service was extended to 179th Street during late nights to replace the R, which terminated at 36th Street and Fourth Avenue. On April 14, 1991, weekend service was extended from Queens Plaza to 71st Avenue. Weekend G service was cut back to Queens Plaza on July 26, 1992.

In January 1991, F express service was proposed to speed service during the height of rush hours which would have reduced travel time by up to five minutes. Alternate F trains would operate express in both directions between Jay Street and Church Avenue, stopping at Seventh Avenue; as a result of this service change, G trains would be cut back from its southern terminal at Smith–Ninth Streets and originate and terminate at Bergen Street to prevent delays in express service. This service change would have been implemented in October 1991, pending approval from the MTA board. An alternate version was implemented in September 2019 when limited rush hour F trains (designated as a diamond <F>) began running express between Jay Street and Church Avenue, stopping at Seventh Avenue.

=== Late 1990s to present ===
On March 23, 1997, G trains started terminating at Court Square on weekends. On August 30, overnight service was permanently cut back from 179th Street to Court Square, with F trains making all stops east of Queens Plaza to replace the G, meaning that the G only ran along the Queens Boulevard Line on weekdays. Evening service between 9 p.m. and 11 p.m. was cut back from Queens Plaza to Court Square.

On December 16, 2001, the 63rd Street Connector opened and the G was removed from Queens Boulevard during weekday rush hours and middays; Court Square became the northern terminal for the G train during this time. Service was extended beyond Court Square to and from 71st Avenue at all other times, which represented the reverse of the previous pattern. Service along the IND Queens Boulevard Line was replaced by the new V train on weekdays during the day. This service change was supposed to go in effect on November 11, but was delayed due to the September 11 attacks. The G was to be truncated to Court Square 24 hours to make room for the V, but due to rider opposition, it was cut back only on weekdays until 8:30 pm. To determine if existing G service along Queens Boulevard could be maintained along with V trains simultaneously, weekday rush hour service was simulated on Saturday, April 14, 2001 from 9:45 to 11:30 AM. G trains operated on a ten-minute frequency, terminated at 179th Street in the northbound direction and originated at 71st Avenue in the southbound direction. V trains operated on a six-minute frequency between 71st Avenue and 57th Street–Seventh Avenue via 63rd Street and made all stops. Another weekday simulation took place during the daytime hours on Saturday, September 8, adapting the service pattern that would be implemented when the V would debut, but without the G operating along Queens Boulevard during weekday rush hours and middays. Some trips were extended beyond Smith–Ninth Streets and originated and terminated at Church Avenue. Frequencies for weekday evening service decreased from every 12 minutes to every 15 minutes, while frequencies for weekday rush hour and Saturday morning and afternoon service increased from every 10 minutes to every 8 minutes.

On April 27, 2003, Saturday morning and afternoon G service was decreased, with service running every 12 minutes instead of every 8 minutes, and Sunday afternoon service was decreased to run every 12 minutes instead of every 10 minutes. In addition, Saturday morning and afternoon G trains turned out of service at Fourth Avenue instead of Church Avenue.

On July 5, 2009, the G was once again extended south at all times to Church Avenue. This was required for overhaul of the Culver Viaduct, which caused the express tracks at Smith–Ninth Streets and Fourth Avenue/Ninth Street—used to switch G trains between tracks after they terminated at Smith–Ninth Streets—to be temporarily taken out of service. This had several benefits. First, five stations previously served by only the F train had more frequent service. Additionally, riders from northern Brooklyn and Long Island City had a direct route to Kensington. Finally, since the Church Avenue terminal had four tracks to store terminating G trains, as opposed to only one storage track at Smith–9th Streets, this reduced delays on both services because terminating G trains could switch to the storage tracks without having to wait in the station for another train to leave, as had occurred at Smith–Ninth Street. On July 19, 2012, MTA officials made this extension permanent. This reduced the need for riders from Park Slope and Kensington to make multiple train transfers to get to northern Brooklyn and Long Island City.

Due to the MTA's financial crisis in the late 2000s, as well as continued capacity issues on the IND Queens Boulevard Line, the G was to be cut back from Forest Hills–71st Avenue to Court Square permanently beginning June 27, 2010. However, due to planned track repairs during the times the G normally ran on the Queens Boulevard Line, service along the line last ran on April 19. In addition, train frequencies were decreased, which inconvenienced about 201,000 weekly commuters since they had to wait longer for G trains.

Flood waters from Hurricane Sandy caused significant damage to the Greenpoint Tubes under the Newtown Creek. Although the G was back in service days after the hurricane, the tube needed permanent repairs. To allow for these repairs, G service ran only between Nassau Avenue and Church Avenue for twelve weekends between July and December 2013. This schedule was also in effect daily between July 25 and September 2, 2014. Service was also suspended on parts of the G route from June 28 to September 3, 2024, as part of a project to automate the Crosstown and Culver lines.

== Issues ==
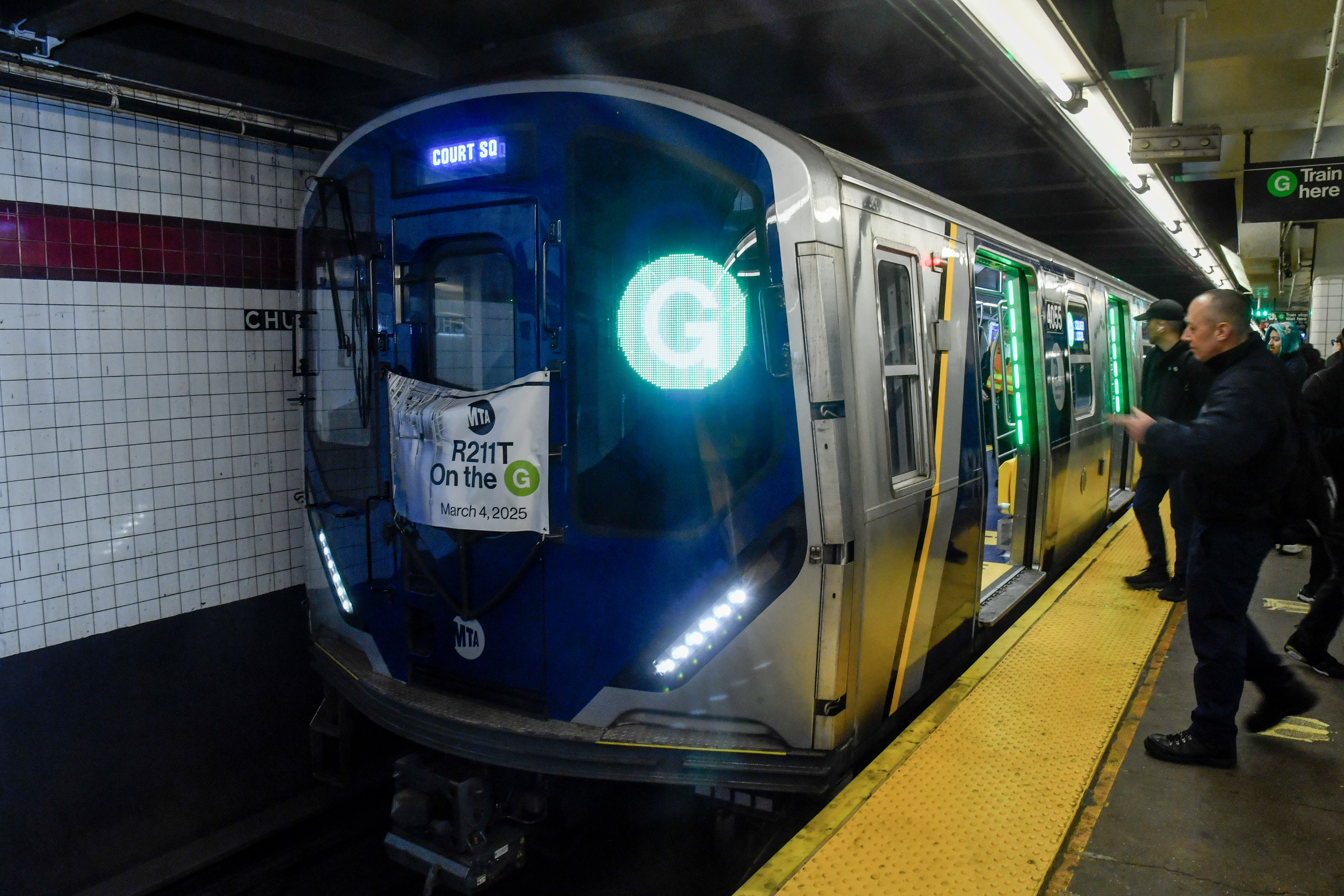
Inaugural run of R211T open gangway cars on the G line at Church Avenue on March 4, 2025.

In the 21st century, the G suffered from a wide range of issues that has resulted in complaints by people living along the route. Historically, it has connected only Brooklyn and Queens, resulting in many people thinking of the G as the subway system's "outcast" and the "unwanted drunk uncle everyone has." One reporter wrote of the G, "[Riders] need it because it goes where no other train does, but they hate that they need it." Compounding to the G's "outcast" reputation, some of the G's stations along the Crosstown Line are in bad shape. Since 2001, a series of service cuts and missing connections to other lines has worsened public opinion of the G.

On December 16, 2001, the G's northern terminus was cut back from Forest Hills to Court Square during weekdays, and since April 2010, this service pattern has applied at all times. This service pattern not only puts more ridership pressure on the E route—already one of the system's busiest before 2001—but also resulted in G trains' lengths being shortened by one third, from 450 feet (140 m) or 6 cars to 300 feet (91 m) or 4. In addition, between 2001 and 2010, weekend service along the G to Forest Hills had been intermittent, with frequent service changes due to "track work". The 2010 route reduction did increase service frequency on the remainder of the route. Finally, the G has few transfers to other services, with missing transfer points to the J and M trains at Broadway and the 2, 3, 4, 5, B, D, N, Q, R and W trains at Fulton Street.

=== 63rd Street Connector service reductions ===
When the connector to the IND 63rd Street Line from the IND Queens Boulevard Line was put into regular passenger service in December 2001, it not only introduced the new V service, but also allowed up to nine additional trains to and from Manhattan on the Queens Boulevard Line during peak hours. However, to make room for the V train on Queens Boulevard, the G had to terminate at Court Square on weekdays. The reroute of the G was part of the original plans of the 63rd Street tunnel and connector, going back to the late 1960s. The service plan was designed to redistribute Queens-bound passenger loads on the crowded IND Queens Boulevard Line, which ran under 53rd Street while in Manhattan. In turn, this plan was intended to bring better service and transfer opportunities, as the V train allowed direct access to 53rd Street and the IND Sixth Avenue Line for Queens Boulevard Local passengers who previously had to transfer to an express train at Queens Plaza. The New York Times prematurely described the service plan as "complex and heavily criticized" because it put more crowding on the E train.

In response to complaints from G riders at public hearings about losing a major transfer point to Manhattan-bound trains at Queens Plaza, the MTA agreed to a number of compromises, including installing a moving sidewalk in the passageway between Court Square and 23rd Street–Ely Avenue (now served by the E, F, and <F> trains) on the Queens Boulevard Line. In addition, a free out-of-system MetroCard transfer to 45th Road–Court House Square on the IRT Flushing Line was created at those two stations. This special transfer was discontinued on June 3, 2011, when an in-system transfer opened at the corner of 23rd Street and 45th Road, which made only the Flushing Line station ADA-accessible. The MTA provided $17 million in funding for making the Crosstown Line accessible as part of the 2015–2019 Capital Program.

The MTA also agreed to extend the G to Forest Hills–71st Avenue during evenings and weekends (when the V was not running), and run more trains on that route. There was a four-hour period where the G, R, and V, as well as the Queens Boulevard line's express services, the E and the F, were all running at once since the V stopped running at midnight and the G was extended to 71st Avenue at 8:00 pm. The authority "had spent several hundred thousand dollars on tests, trying to figure out a way to keep the G train running past Court Square and farther into Queens on weekdays, but because of the addition of the V train, which shared space along the Queens Boulevard Line with the trains already there (the E, F and R trains), G trains could not fit during the daytime, when service is heaviest."

However, due to construction on the Queens Boulevard Line, the G train frequently terminated at Court Square even when the published timetable said it ran to 71st Avenue. Some riders were suspicious that the service disruptions were "simply a de facto way to implement the original plan of halving G train service." The original plans called for the G terminate at Court Square at all times; that plan was shelved in 2001 in the face of community opposition, but due to budget cuts, the MTA decided to implement it in 2010. An MTA spokesman said, "It's not personal.... If you want to keep the system up to date, you need to make sure the track and switching are all in good repair."

Community groups such as Save the G! and the Riders Alliance have been frequent activists for improvements of G service. Save the G! regularly lobbied the MTA for more G train service since the original cutbacks when the V was introduced in 2001. They made the restoration of service to the Queens Boulevard Line at all times an issue in the 2002 New York gubernatorial race, but the transit authority said, "Unfortunately, putting the G back to full service is just not an option, given our track capacity—and that's not likely to change." After transit advocates requested that Mayor Zohran Mamdani consider restoring weekend service to Forest Hills in 2026, the Mamdani administration announced in February that it would study the proposal, although any decision to extend the G route would have to be made by the MTA.

=== Changes to train length ===
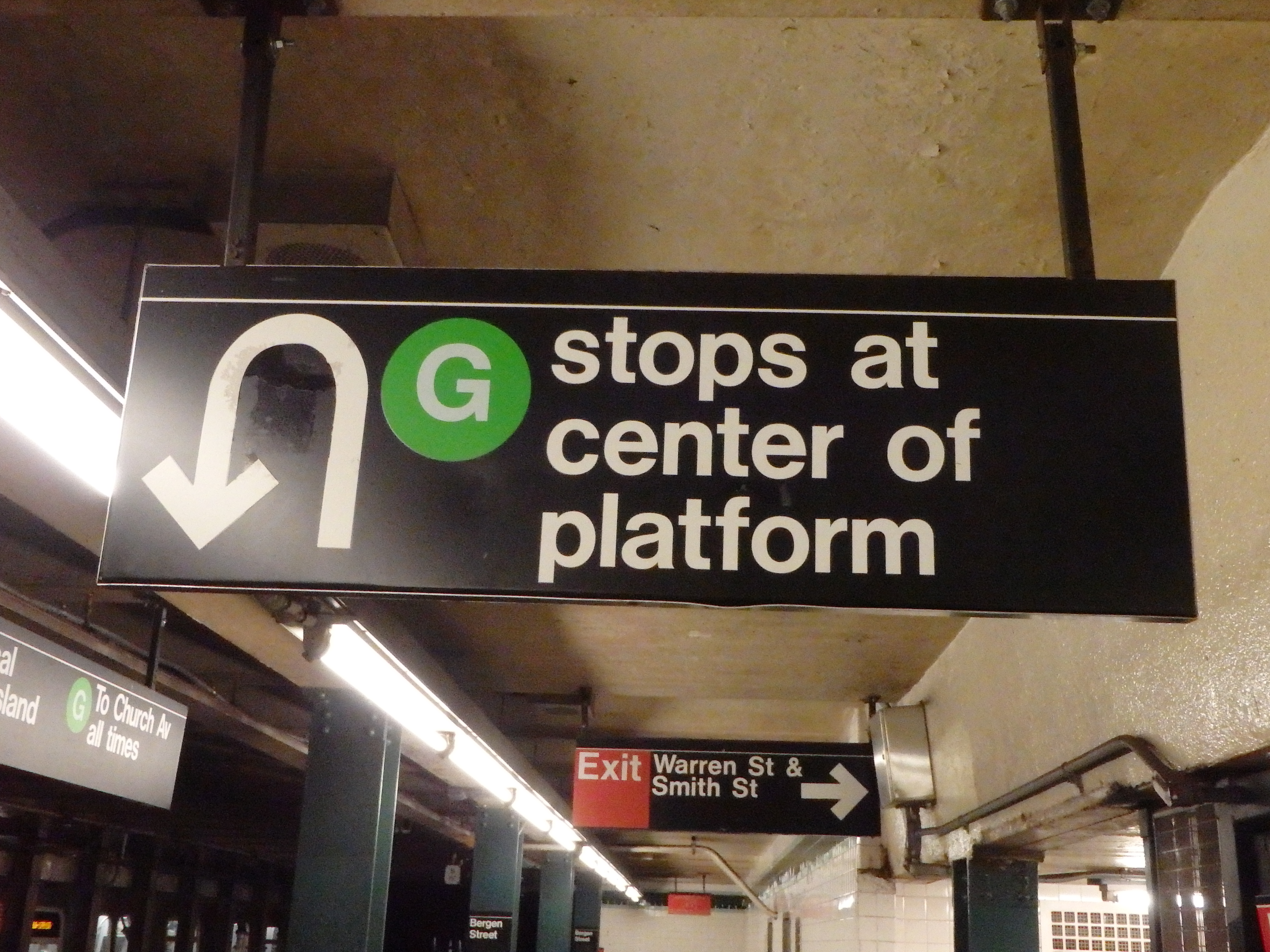
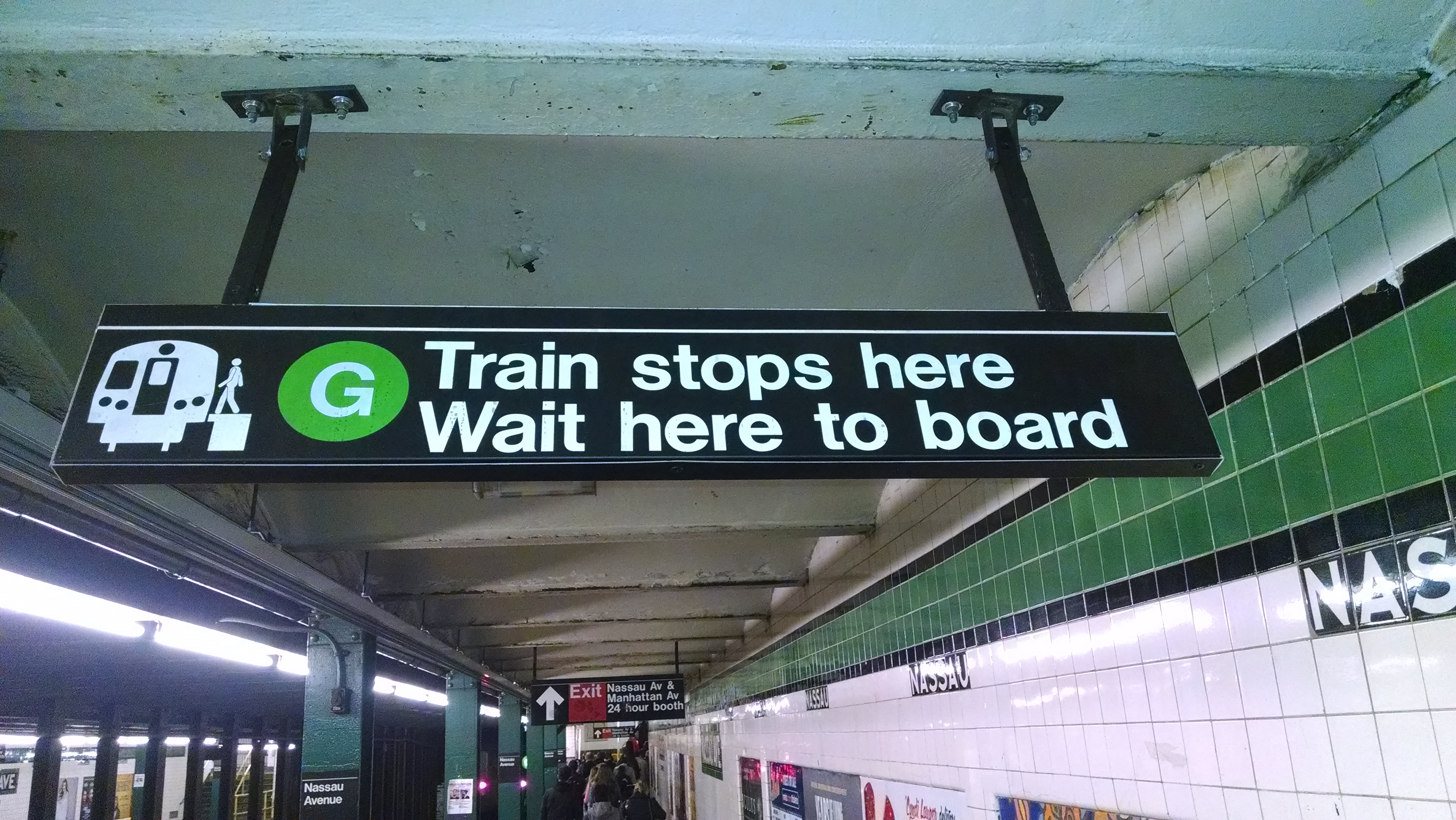
Signs at Bergen Street (top) and Nassau Avenue (bottom) directing passengers to the correct boarding areas, due to the short 300-foot (91 m) length of the trains

To increase service and reduce waiting time due to the 63rd Street Connector cutbacks, the G would need more trains, but there were not enough cars available in the system. The solution was to reduce the length of trains to increase service frequency. Previously, the G service had run 8 60-foot (18 m) car trains or 6 75-foot (23 m) car trains; both were shorter than the typical 600-foot (180 m) length of B Division trains because ridership was deemed too low to justify running full-length G trains in frequent intervals. Under the 2001 plan, trains were shortened from six to four 75-foot (23 m) cars, sticking all the leftover cars together to make the extra trains for the G, and the additional trains needed for V service.

This meant that riders would be packed into smaller trains, and led some passengers to miss trains because they were standing at the wrong part of the platform. In the past, there have been signs indicating where the train stops at some stations, in addition to the "4" and "6" markers next to the tracks used by train operators as stop points. Still, the overall lack of visual identifiers of train stop points on the platforms, the differing stop points during different times of day, and the location of staircases, transfer passageways and platform benches have been cited as a cause of passengers missing trains or being bunched into single cars. Beginning in 2013, additional signs were installed along G train platforms. In 2014, several improvements were implemented due to an infusion of extra funding, with G trains to be lengthened in 2019 (see below).

=== Non-free transfers ===
Save the G!, the Riders Alliance, and other organizations have also lobbied for the creation of new free out-of-system transfers to nearby stations. The most prominent is between Broadway on the Crosstown Line and either Hewes Street or Lorimer Street on the BMT Jamaica Line, which are both about three blocks away; this transfer has been previously proposed. In 2005, an MTA spokesperson stated, "We have no intention of making that a permanent free transfer." This sentiment was repeated in 2013, with the MTA citing the loss of around $770,000 in revenue if the transfer were to become free.

Temporary free transfers have been provided in the past, including one to Lorimer Street in 1999 due to suspended service over the Williamsburg Bridge on the J, M, and Z trains, and again during the Summer 2014 G service suspension north of Nassau Avenue. A second transfer, from Fulton Street to the busy Atlantic Avenue–Barclays Center complex in Downtown Brooklyn, was rejected by the MTA due to the long walking distance between the two stations, as well as the fact that there is a transfer to Manhattan-bound A and C trains at Hoyt–Schermerhorn Streets.

A temporary transfer between Broadway and Hewes Street or Lorimer Street (along the BMT Jamaica Line) was reinstated in April 2019 due to L train service changes associated with the 14th Street Tunnel shutdown. The transfer was in effect until May 31, 2020. A temporary, MetroCard-only transfer between 21st Street and Hunters Point Avenue (along the IRT Flushing Line) was proposed, but not implemented.

== 21st-century upgrades ==
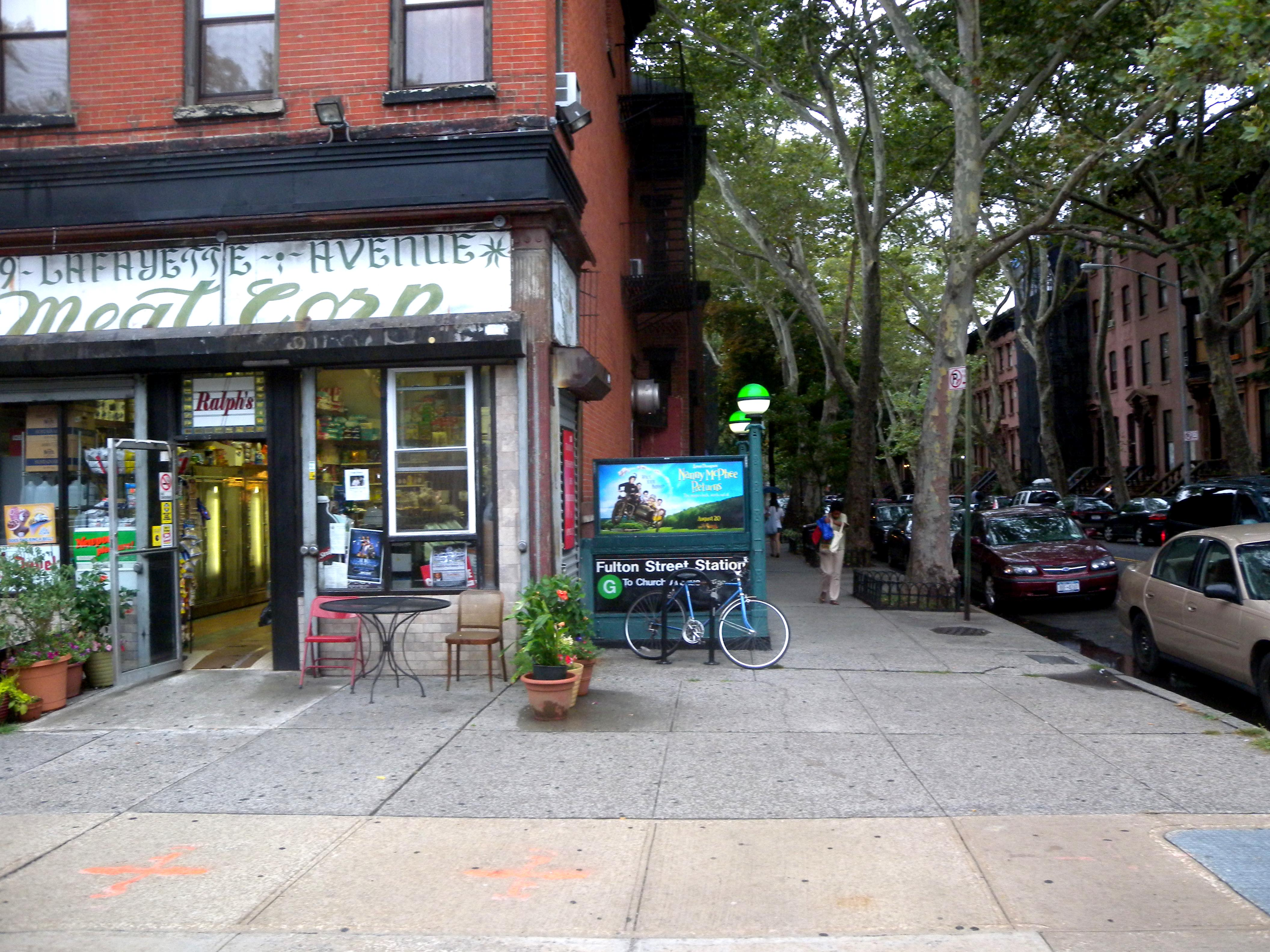
A reopened entrance to the Fulton Street station along South Portland Avenue, 2010

=== Station entrance reopenings ===
Most stations along the IND Crosstown Line were built with multiple exits to the street. Over the years, many lower-use exits were closed (as they were in other parts of the subway), as the city was concerned that they were a magnet for criminals; this resulted in G trains along the Crosstown Line needing to stop at the locations closest to the exits. However, in July 2005, in response to community pressure, the MTA agreed to re-open an exit to the southwestern corner of South Portland Avenue to the southbound platform of the Fulton Street station. The New York Times described it as a "minor victory" for "a maligned line." Additionally, exits to the intersection of Powers Street, Hope Street, and Union Avenue at Metropolitan Avenue were reopened on February 28, 2019, to address possible capacity constraints due to the L train shutdown. In 2019, the Court Square station received several new stairways to accommodate increased ridership from L train riders during the reconstruction of the BMT Canarsie Line tunnels under the East River, which started in late April 2019.

=== Review of the G route ===
In 2013, at the request of State Senators Daniel Squadron and Martin Malave Dilan, the MTA conducted a review of the entire G route. The route had been maligned by riders because of its unreliability, and the review recommended a few service changes for the G. On June 9, 2014, a budget surplus in the MTA allowed these improvements to be implemented. These improvements included an increase in the number of trains per hour, from six to 7 1/2 trains per hour during evening rush hour; uniform stopping locations for trains, whereas previously, trains stopped at different places along the platform at different times of the day; public service announcement systems on platforms along the IND Crosstown Line; relocated benches; and new CCTV systems installed for OPTO. Such improvements eliminated the infamous "G train sprint," wherein riders ran for G trains that stopped at the other end of the platforms.

From 2010 to 2015, ridership on the G rose 17%, with approximately 150,000 riders per weekday in 2015. At the time, it was the route with the fastest growing ridership base in the entire system. These improvements also had the additional benefit of being able to accommodate the growing ridership base in gentrified neighborhoods along the line, like Park Slope, Carroll Gardens, Bedford–Stuyvesant, Williamsburg, Greenpoint, and Long Island City. This was due in part to the G's weekday frequencies having become more dependable as a result of the 2013 review. Even so, the G continued to have long headways during weekends until July 2023. As of 2025, the G has a weekday ridership of 166,000.

=== L train shutdown ===
Despite the influx of ridership, train lengths did not change. In 2016, it was announced that the G was expected to receive longer trains to accommodate displaced L train riders in 2019, when the 14th Street Tunnel shutdown was supposed to limit direct L train access to Manhattan. As a result, riders in Williamsburg, Greenpoint, and Bushwick would need to use the G to transfer to other subway routes that travel to Manhattan. The delivery of new R179 subway cars to other routes would make it possible for older fleets from these other routes to be passed onto the G. In addition, three extra G trains per hour would run during peak periods, for a total of 11 trains per hour during the shutdown. A full-length G train would run every five to six minutes, more than doubling the route's total capacity. (Note: Each consist of trains is 300 feet (91 m) long, the length of a standard G train as of 2018. A full-length train on most B Division routes is 600 feet (180 m) long, and assuming that the G would use 600-foot-long trains, this will nearly triple the G train's capacity from 8 to 22 consists of 300-foot trains every hour. However, full-length trains on some routes, namely the BMT Eastern Division (J, L, M, and Z trains), are 480 feet (150 m) long. If the G uses 480-foot-long trains, its capacity will only be slightly more than doubled from 8 to 17.6 consists of 300-foot-long trains.) Since the G train's schedule is designed around that of the F train, train frequencies on both routes would have to be modified.

In July 2018, the MTA published a report stating that the G route would have 15 full-length trains per hour between Court Square and Bedford–Nostrand Avenues, or a rate of one train every four minutes. South of Bedford–Nostrand Avenues, the G would have a headway of 12 trains per hour. The terminus for most of the remaining G trips would be Church Avenue, but some trains would continue two additional stops to 18th Avenue, because only a limited number of trains can terminate at Church Avenue without causing disruptions to F service. Other temporary improvements during the L train shutdown would include free-out-of-system transfers between the G at Broadway and the J, M, and Z trains at Lorimer Street and Hewes Street, as well as between the G at 21st Street and the 7 and <7> trains at Hunters Point Avenue. In addition, closed entrances would be reopened at Metropolitan Avenue, and the Nassau Avenue and Metropolitan Avenue stations' fare control areas would be reconfigured to accommodate increased ridership.

The L train shutdown was curtailed in January 2019. Instead of being a full-time closure, it would only be a partial closure on nights and weekends. However, the station enhancements along the route were still implemented. The following month, the MTA decided that the G would not receive full-length trains, though it would still see an increase in train frequencies during nights and weekends. A spokesperson for the MTA said in 2023 that there was not enough rolling stock available to allow G trains to be lengthened without decreasing frequencies. Weekend frequencies on the G route were increased in July 2023.

=== CBTC signaling ===
In December 2022, the MTA announced that it would award a $368 million design–build contract to Crosstown Partners, a joint venture between Thales Group and TC Electric LLC, to install communications-based train control (CBTC) along the length of the G route. The contract includes not only the Crosstown Line between Court Square and Bergen Street, but also the Culver Line between Bergen Street and Church Avenue. The project also included adding Wi-Fi in the tunnels. Upon the completion of the contract, the G would be one of three routes in the system to be entirely equipped with CBTC, besides the L and 7 trains.

To accommodate the CBTC upgrades, the Crosstown Line was partially closed in three phases starting on June 28, 2024, and G service was partially suspended. Initially, the northern half of the line was closed, followed by the southern half. Local politicians asked the MTA to operate full-length G trains and extend the route to Forest Hills following the partial closures. However, MTA chairman Janno Lieber said that longer G trains would not be restored until ridership levels increase, though the CBTC signaling would be capable of handling lengthened G trains. Full service resumed on September 3, 2024. As part of the project, the Crosstown Line tunnels used by the G train between the Court Square and Hoyt–Schermerhorn Streets stations were retrofitted with 5G cellular service, which was activated north of Bedford–Nostrand Avenues in November 2025. The MTA indicated in July 2025 that the Crosstown CBTC upgrade would be delayed due to the need to add new 5G transmitters to the R211s used on the G route.

== Fleet ==
The G operates 300-foot (91 m) trains, half the length of normal B Division standards. It also operates One Person Train Operation (OPTO) service during late nights and weekends. Since the G's stations can still accommodate full-length 600-foot (180 m) trains, trains serve only certain parts of the platform at each station (see G (New York City Subway service) § Changes to train length). As of July 2025, the G's fleet entirely consists of R211A and R211T cars, the latter of which began running on the G in 2025. The G route typically operates with 13 train sets, four of which are R211Ts and the rest R211As.

== Route ==
=== Signage history ===
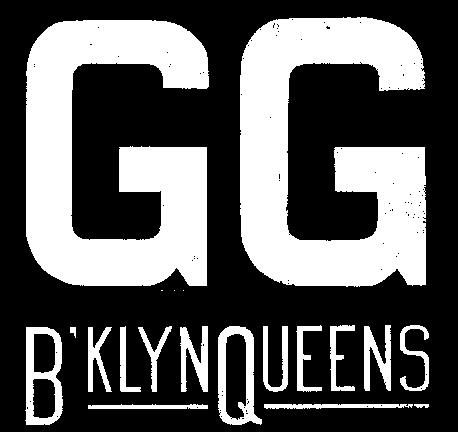
Pre-1967 bullet used on the R1s to R38s

1967–1979 bullet

1979-1985 bullet

The current bullet used since 1985

=== Service pattern ===
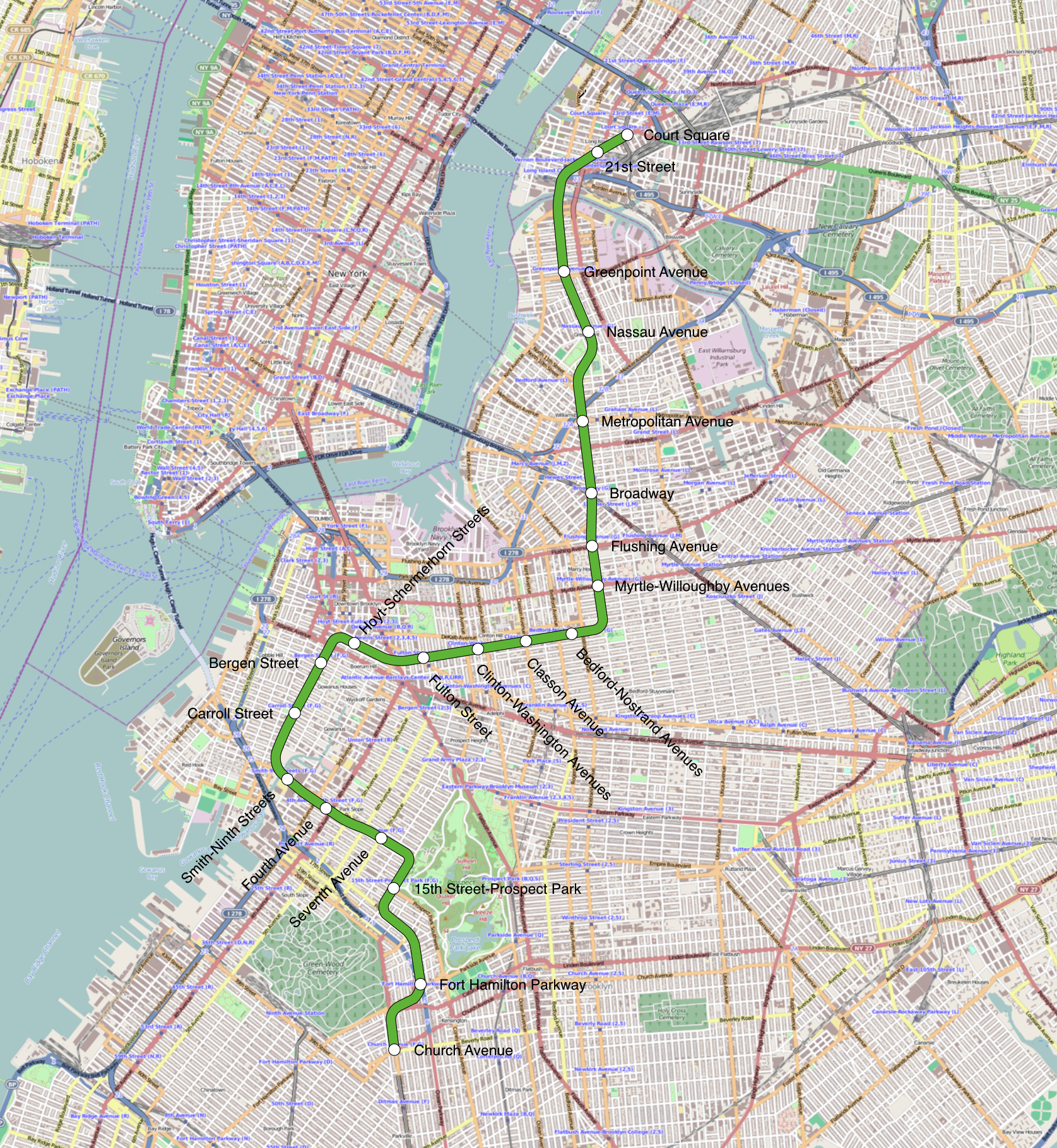
To scale line map

The G uses the following lines with the same service pattern at all times.

Line	From	To	Tracks
IND Crosstown Line	Court Square	Hoyt–Schermerhorn Streets	all
IND Culver Line	Bergen Street	Church Avenue	local

=== Stations ===
For a more detailed station listing, see the articles on the lines listed above.

Station service legend
Stops all times	Stops 24 hours a day
Stops all times except late nights	Stops every day during daytime hours only
Stops late nights only	Stops every day during overnight hours only
Stops weekdays during the day	Stops during weekday daytime hours only
Stops all times except rush hours in the peak direction	Stops 24 hours a day, except during weekday rush hours in the peak direction
Station closed	Station closed
Stops rush hours only	Stops rush hours only (limited service)
Stops rush hours in the peak direction only	Stops weekdays in the peak direction only
Time period details
Disabled access	Station is compliant with the Americans with Disabilities Act
↑	Station is compliant with the Americans with Disabilities Act in the indicated direction only
↓	Station is compliant with the Americans with Disabilities Act in the indicated direction only
	Elevator access to mezzanine only

G service	Stations	Disabled access	Subway transfers	Connections
Queens
Crosstown Line
Stops all times	Court Square	Disabled access	7 <7> (IRT Flushing Line); E F <F> (IND Queens Boulevard Line at Court Square–23rd Street)	
Stops all times	21st Street			LIRR City Terminal Zone at Hunterspoint Avenue (peak hours only)
Brooklyn
Stops all times	Greenpoint Avenue	Disabled access		NYC Ferry: East River Route (at India Street west of West Street)
Stops all times	Nassau Avenue			
Stops all times	Metropolitan Avenue	Disabled access	L (BMT Canarsie Line at Lorimer Street)	
Stops all times	Broadway			
Stops all times	Flushing Avenue			
Stops all times	Myrtle–Willoughby Avenues			
Stops all times	Bedford–Nostrand Avenues			B44 Select Bus Service
Stops all times	Classon Avenue			
Stops all times	Clinton–Washington Avenues			
Stops all times	Fulton Street			
Stops all times	Hoyt–Schermerhorn Streets	Elevator access to mezzanine only	A C (IND Fulton Street Line)	
Culver Line
Stops all times	Bergen Street		F	
Stops all times	Carroll Street		F	
Stops all times	Smith–Ninth Streets		F	
Stops all times	Fourth Avenue		F D N R W (BMT Fourth Avenue Line at Ninth Street)	
Stops all times	Seventh Avenue	Disabled access	F <F>	
Stops all times	15th Street–Prospect Park		F	
Stops all times	Fort Hamilton Parkway		F	
Stops all times	Church Avenue	Disabled access	F <F>	

== In popular culture ==
The G train is shown in the TV series Girls, as the show's main character, Hannah, lives in Greenpoint (near a stop along the G) and sometimes uses the route. The G train is also the subject of the song "G Train" by Thirdstory, featuring Pusha T.

== See also ==
- Brooklyn–Queens Connector, an unbuilt light rail route in Brooklyn and Queens
- Triboro RX, a proposed light rail route in Brooklyn and Queens
