= Broadway station (IND Crosstown Line) =

New York City Subway station in Brooklyn

Broadway
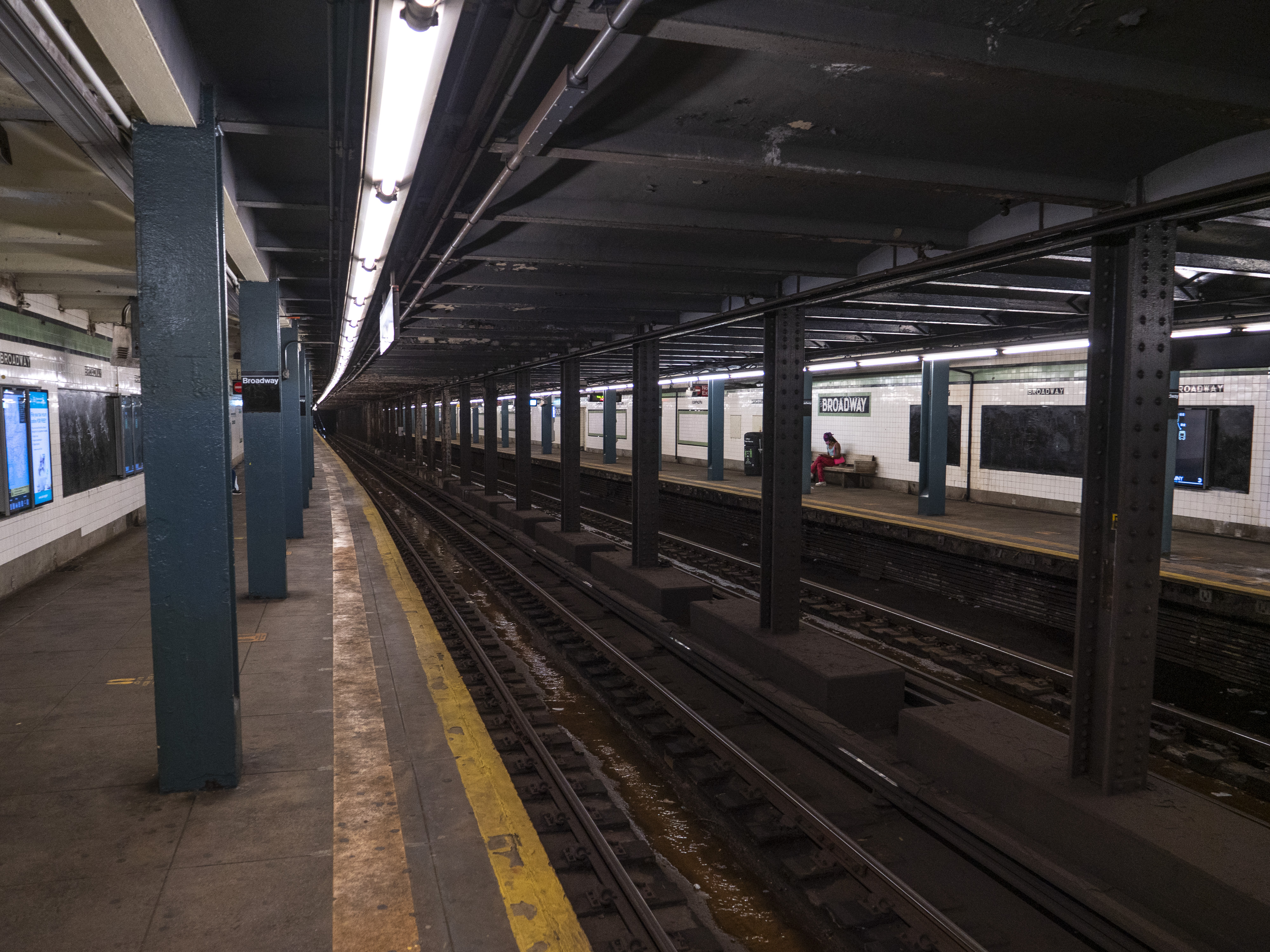
- View from southbound platform

Station statistics
- Address: Broadway & Union Avenue; Brooklyn, New York
- Borough: Brooklyn
- Locale: Williamsburg
- Coordinates: 40.705433°N 73.950219°W
- Division: B (IND)
- Line: IND Crosstown Line
- Services: G (all times)
- Transit: NYCT Bus: B46, B60
- Structure: Underground
- Platforms: 2 side platforms
- Tracks: 2

Other information
- Opened: July 1, 1937; 89 years ago

Traffic
- 2025: 1,177,914 ▲17.3%
- Rank: 282 out of 423
Services
Preceding station	New York City Subway	Following station
Metropolitan Avenue toward Court Square	G (New York City Subway service)	Flushing Avenue toward Church Avenue
Location
Location within New York City Subway
Location within New York City
Location within New York
Track layout
Street map
Station service legend
Symbol	Description
Stops all times	Stops all times

The Broadway station is a station on the IND Crosstown Line of the New York City Subway. Located at the intersection of Broadway and Union Avenue in Williamsburg, Brooklyn, it is served at all times by the G train.

== History ==
The station opened on July 1, 1937, as part of the extension of the Crosstown Line from Nassau Avenue to Hoyt–Schermerhorn Streets.

== Station layout ==
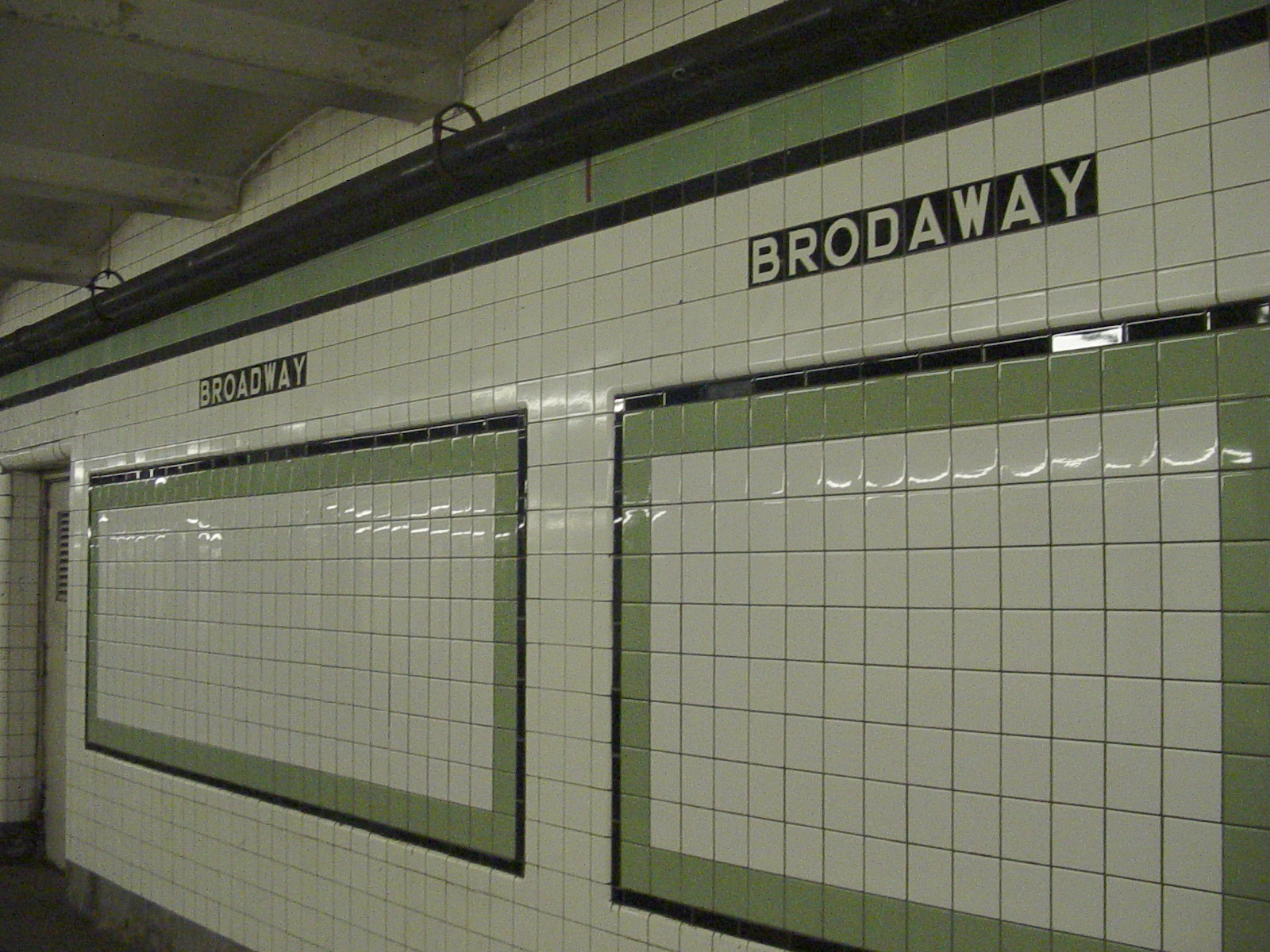
Station tiles with the misspelled "BRODAWAY" on the right

This underground station has two tracks and two side platforms. The G stops at the station at all times. The station is between Metropolitan Avenue to the north and Flushing Avenue to the south.

The platforms have a light green trim line with a black border and mosaic name tablets reading "BROADWAY" in white sans-serif lettering on a black background and light green border. The tiles were part of a color-coded tile system used throughout the IND. The tile colors were designed to facilitate navigation for travelers going away from Lower Manhattan. Because the Crosstown Line does not merge into a line that enters Manhattan at either end, all stations on the line had green tiles. The I-beam columns in the entire station are dark grey-blue, with alternating ones on the platforms having the standard black station name plate in white lettering.

Small station signs underneath the trim line read "BROADWAY" in white lettering on a black background. One of the icon tiles on the northbound platform was incorrectly spelled as "BRODAWAY"; this mistake may have been part of the station's original tilework. After the Daily News and several other news outlets reported on the misspelling in February 2009, the two wrong letters were covered with the correct ones printed on stickers, but the stickers were removed by December 2009. In December 2011, the MTA stated the tiles would remain.

=== Exits ===
The station has a small mezzanine above the platforms and tracks at the south end, allowing a free transfer between directions. Two staircases from each platform go up to the mezzanine.

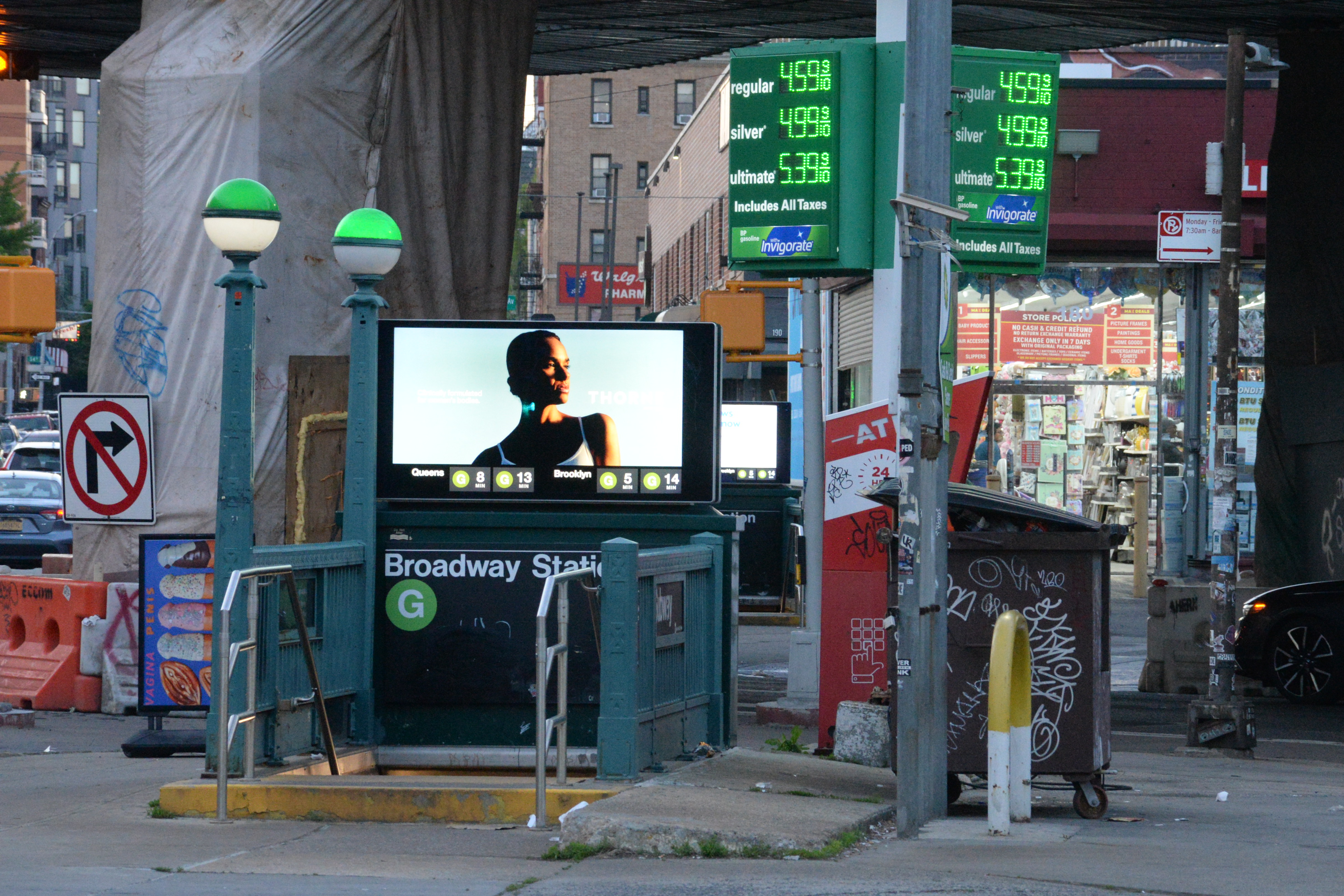
Staircase at the southeast corner of Union Avenue and Broadway. The elevated BMT Jamaica Line is visible in the background

A turnstile bank provides entrance/exit from the station. Outside fare control, there is a token booth and four street stairs: one to the southwestern corner of Broadway and Heyward Street, and the remaining three to the southwestern, southeastern, and northeastern corners of Broadway and Union Avenue.

The station previously had a full-length mezzanine. However, the northern half was closed to the public, and parts of it currently hold offices while the rest of the mezzanine is used for storage space. The mezzanine had a street stair to the northwestern corner of Johnson Avenue and Union Avenue, and a small upper landing with street stair to all corners of South 5th Street, Montrose Avenue, and Union Avenue except for the southwestern corner.

=== Free transfer ===
The BMT Jamaica Line lies directly above the staircases to this station; Lorimer Street and Hewes Street are located to the east and west of the entrances, respectively, with Lorimer Street being closer to the station. However, there is no permanent free transfer between either of those stations and this one, in spite of requests from riders and transit advocacy groups.

Despite the lack of a free transfer, temporary free transfers have been offered during construction or service disruptions. A transfer was provided from July 25, 2014, to September 2, 2014, between Lorimer Street and this station, due to the closure of the IND Crosstown Line under the Newtown Creek for tunnel repairs. A free transfer using a MetroCard between Broadway and Lorimer Street stations was provided during the 14th Street Tunnel shutdown from April 2019 until May 31, 2020, during weekends and late nights. A temporary free MetroCard transfer to and from the Hewes Street station was also made available. These two transfers were honored through the end of May 2020, even though L train tunnel work was completed on April 26.

== Unfinished station ==
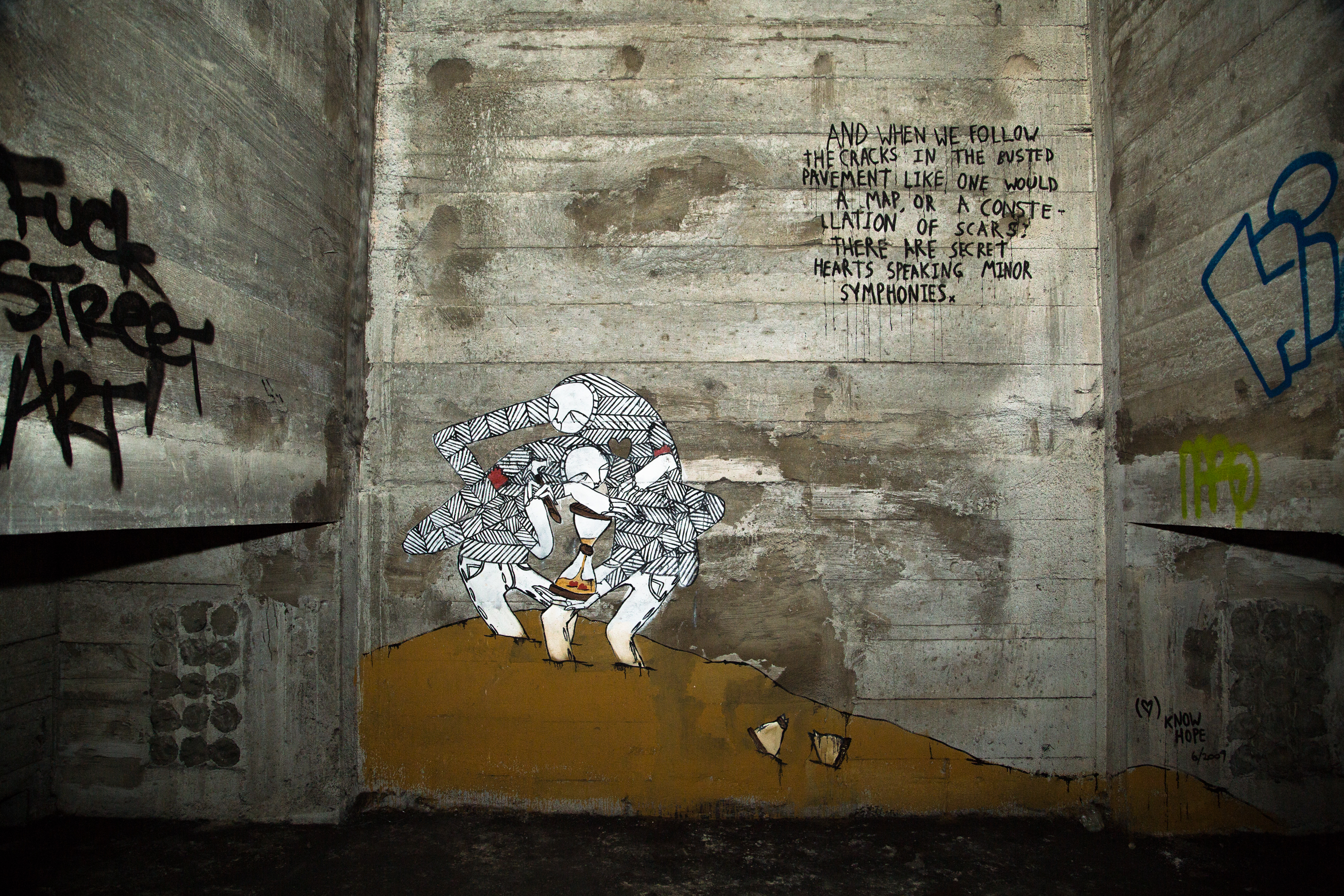
A mural by Addam Yekutieli at the unfinished station, part of "the Underbelly Project"

The north end of the Broadway station has been blocked by false walls. This northern third of the platform level area consists of passages that would have served as transfers to an unfinished station on a level directly above the Crosstown Line tracks (provisionally called South Fourth Street or Union Avenue). The unfinished station was built as part of a planned expansion of the Independent Subway System.

The station is a semi-complete shell with four island platforms and six track beds, having the same layout as Hoyt–Schermerhorn Streets station. No rails, tiles, lights, or stairs were built. The unfinished station, which is only about as long as Union Avenue is wide, was designed to be the main transfer point from both a line running under Worth Street and a line running under Houston Street coming from Manhattan with the Crosstown Line. These lines would have become two major trunk lines going east; one would have run under Utica Avenue, and the other would have run towards the Rockaways along Myrtle Avenue and Central Avenue.

The closed mezzanine area of the Broadway station has stairs at its north end to an upper level mezzanine directly above the unfinished station. This mezzanine has stairs leading to the northern corners of the intersection of South 4th Street, Meserole Street, and Union Avenue. However, it has no stairs leading to the unfinished station itself. Like the closed mezzanine area of the Broadway station, the upper level mezzanine is used for storage.

In 2010, dozens of street artists created murals on the walls of the unfinished station over the course of 18 months, collectively called "the Underbelly Project", without clearance from the MTA. Afterwards, the MTA removed access to the transfer passage on the northbound platform at Broadway and replaced dilapidated fencing blocking closed areas with cinderblock walls.
