= IND Crosstown Line =

New York City Subway line

- The G train, which uses the Crosstown Line through Brooklyn and Queens, is colored lime green.

Overview
- Owner: City of New York
- Locale: Brooklyn and Queens, New York City
- Termini: Court Square; Hoyt–Schermerhorn Streets
- Stations: 13

Service
- Type: Rapid transit
- System: New York City Subway
- Operator: New York City Transit Authority
- Daily ridership: 70,453

History
- Opened: August 19, 1933; 93 years ago
- Last extension: 1937

Technical
- Num of tracks: 2-4
- Character: Underground
- Track gauge: 4 ft 8 1/2 in (1,435 mm) standard gauge
- Electrification: Third rail, 625 V DC

The IND Crosstown Line or Brooklyn–Queens Crosstown Line is a rapid transit line of the B Division of the New York City Subway in Brooklyn and Queens, New York City. It provides crosstown service between western Brooklyn and southwestern Queens and is the only non-shuttle subway line that does not carry trains to and from Manhattan.

== Extent and service ==
The following service uses part or all of the IND Crosstown Line, whose bullet is colored lime green:

	Time period	Section of line
"G" train	all times	south of Court Square

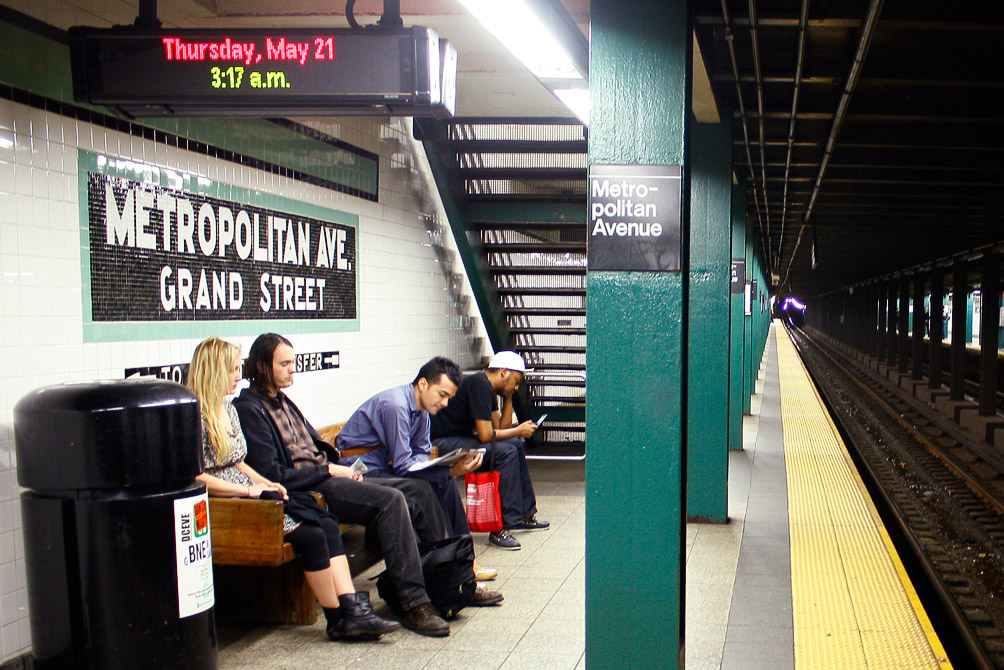
Metropolitan Avenue station

The only service to use the Crosstown Line is the G. The line north of Court Square has not been in regular use since 2010.

The north end of the Crosstown Line is a flying junction with the IND Queens Boulevard Line and 60th Street Tunnel Connection just south of Queens Plaza. The line then travels south as a two-track line, except for a center relay track south of Court Square. At the turn from Marcy Avenue to Lafayette Avenue, two center tracks appear, merging into one after crossovers to the main tracks. These tracks were to be used for a split to another line in a 1931 expansion plan. This center track continues through Bedford–Nostrand Avenues and then ends with crossovers to the main tracks, but space remains in the center through Classon Avenue for the third track.

At Hoyt–Schermerhorn Streets, the Crosstown Line passes through the middle of the four-track IND Fulton Street Line. Cross-platform interchange is available between the lines, but no track connections exist. After Hoyt–Schermerhorn Streets, the line turns south and ends as a merge into the local tracks of the IND Culver Line, just south of the split of that line into local and express tracks.

== History ==
=== Development and 20th century ===
Plans for a crosstown subway line were floated as early as 1912. In 1923, a plan for such a line, to be operated by the Brooklyn Rapid Transit Company (BRT) from the Queensboro Bridge under Jackson Avenue, Manhattan Avenue, Roebling Street, Bedford Avenue, and Hancock Street to Franklin Avenue at the north end of the BMT Franklin Avenue Line, was adopted by the city. However, the following year, Mayor Hylan announced his opposition to it. In addition, residents of central Brooklyn, which was already heavily developed, opposed an elevated line because of noise and aesthetic concerns, but the BRT would not build a subway because an elevated was the cheapest option.

Eventually, the line was moved and incorporated into the city's Independent Subway System (IND). The junction with the IND Queens Boulevard Line in Long Island City was originally supposed to have a second wye, with service from Manhattan via the 53rd Street Tunnel planned to feed into the Crosstown Line. This would have been part of a loop service between the Crosstown and Eighth Avenue Lines.

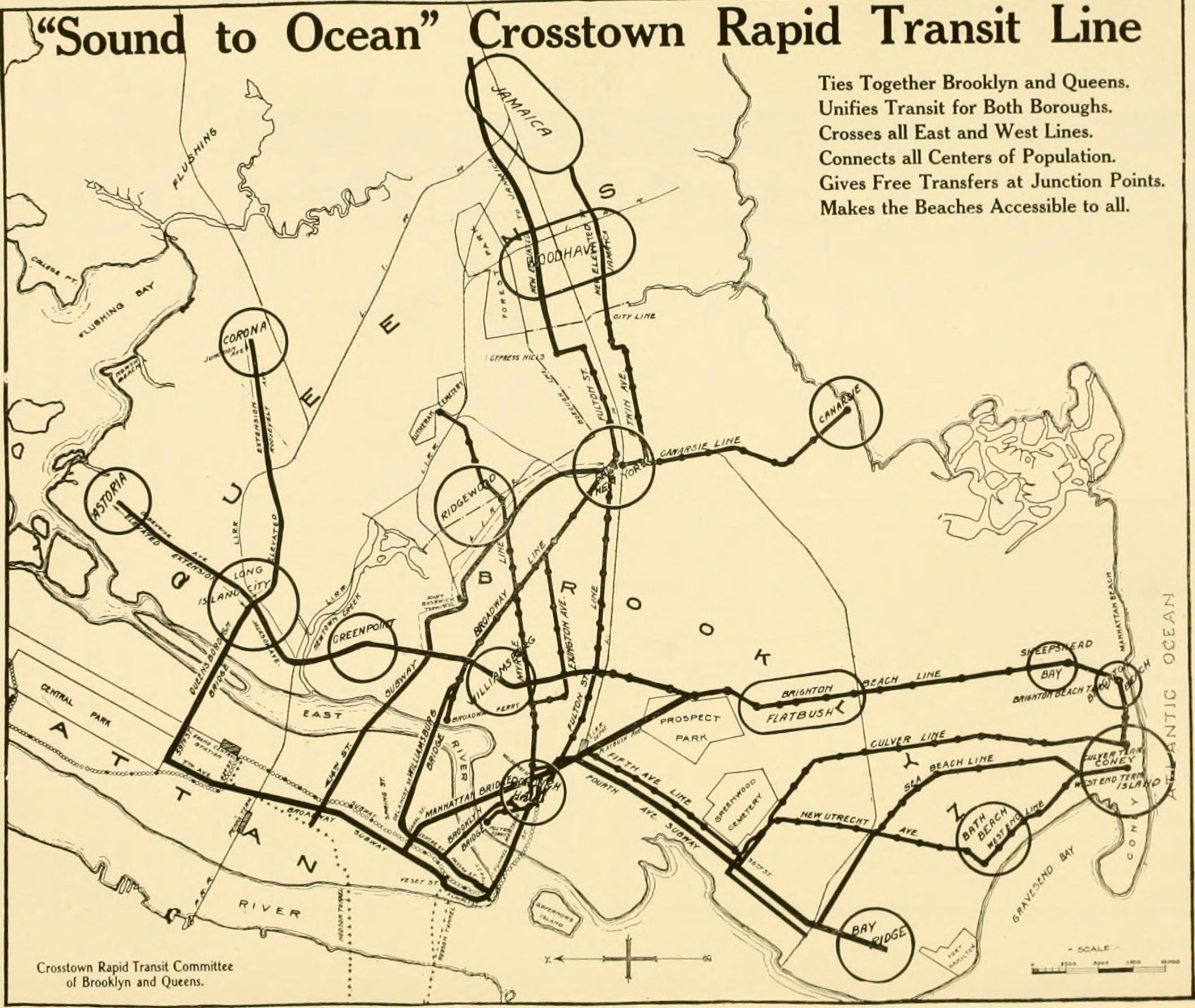
1920 proposal

The first contract to build the Crosstown Line, for a section north of Nassau Avenue in Brooklyn, was awarded in 1928. The portion of the line crossing Newtown Creek between Brooklyn and Queens, now known as the Greenpoint Tubes, was built without the use of a tunneling shield or compressed air, contrary to the convention of the time. The tunnel was bored through solid rock, crossing under the East River Tunnels of the Long Island Rail Road and the IRT Flushing Line, then lined with concrete.

On August 19, 1933, the line was opened north of Nassau Avenue, and the GG began operation to Queens Plaza. The entire Crosstown Line was completed and connected to the IND Culver Line on July 1, 1937, whereupon the GG was extended in both directions to Smith–Ninth Streets and Forest Hills–71st Avenue.

In 1946, as part of a $1 billion plan issued by the New York City Board of Transportation, a branch of the IND Crosstown Line was to be built, with the routing via Franklin Avenue and connecting with the BMT Brighton Line. This would have replaced the BMT Franklin Avenue Line.

In 1986, the New York City Transit Authority launched a study to determine whether to close 79 stations on 11 routes, including the entire Crosstown Line, due to low ridership and high repair costs. Numerous figures, including New York City Council member Carol Greitzer, criticized the plans.

=== Service history ===
Over the years, the termini for the GG (relabeled G in 1985) varied, including being extended to Jamaica–179th Street or cut back to Queens Plaza. On December 16, 2001, a new weekdays-only V train (replaced in 2010 by the M) running local on the Queens Boulevard Line required the truncation of the G to Long Island City–Court Square during weekdays. G service was extended to Forest Hills–71st Avenue at all other times until April 19, 2010, when G service was permanently cut back from the Queens Boulevard Line due to budget cuts and closures for repair work.

Service was also extended to Church Avenue several times, the most recent extension being in 2009. During weekend service disruptions on the F service between Jay and Bergen Streets, trains were extended beyond Church Avenue to Coney Island.

=== 21st century ===
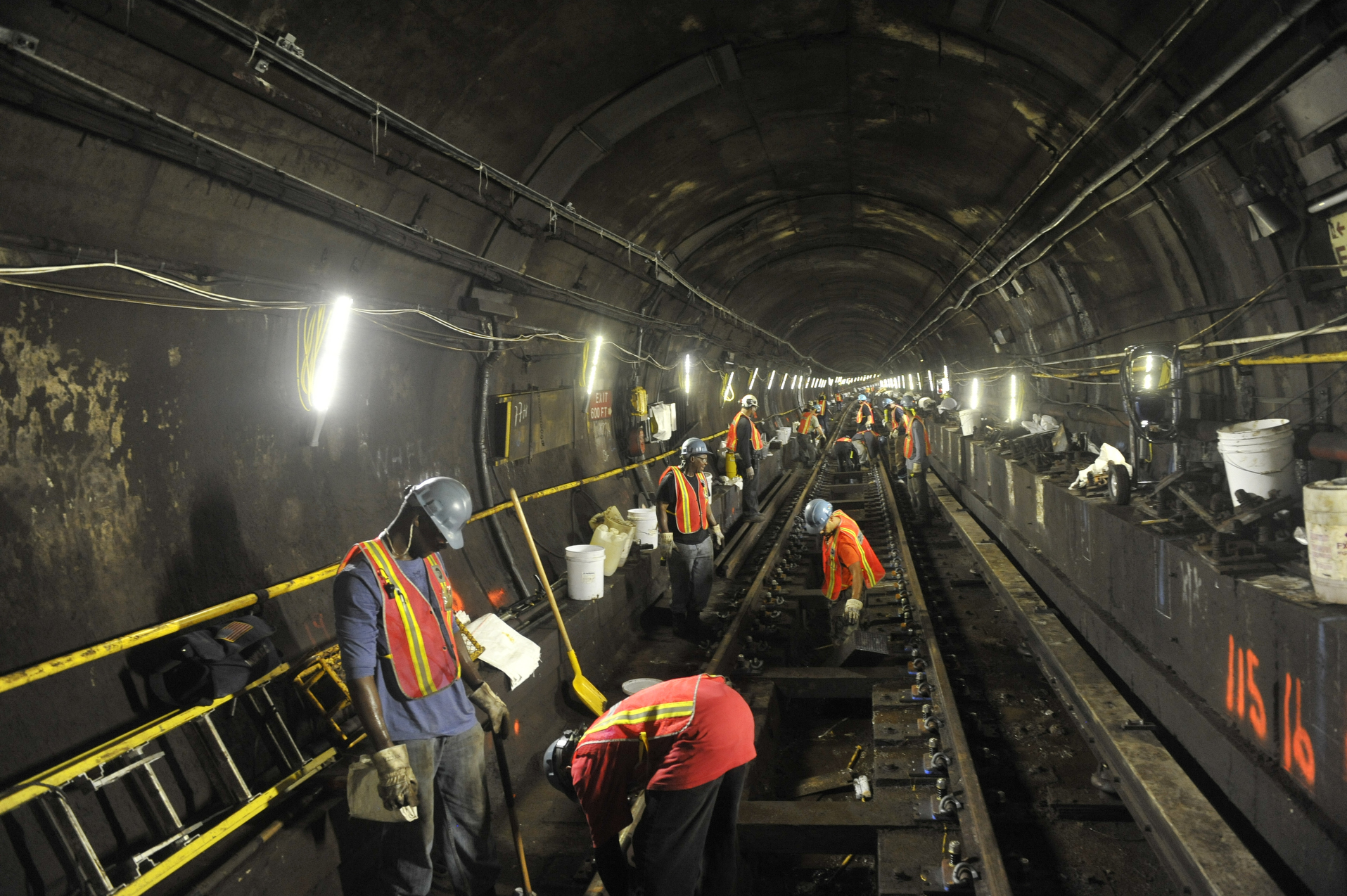
Repairs of the Greenpoint Tubes from Hurricane Sandy

In 2012, flood waters from Hurricane Sandy caused significant damage to the Greenpoint Tubes under the Newtown Creek. Although the G was back in service days after the hurricane, the tube needed permanent repairs. To allow for these repairs, G service was curtailed for twelve weekends between July and December 2013, as well as daily between July 25 and September 2, 2014.

The 2015–2019 MTA Capital Plan called for the Crosstown Line's Classon Avenue and Flushing Avenue stations, along with 31 others, to undergo a complete overhaul as part of the Enhanced Station Initiative. Updates would include cellular service, Wi-Fi, USB charging stations, interactive service advisories and maps, improved signage, and improved station lighting. However, in April 2018, it was announced that cost overruns had forced the MTA to reduce the number of subway stations included in the program from 33 stations to 20. The stations to be renovated along the IND Crosstown Line were among the 13 stations without funding, which will be pushed back to the 2020–2024 Capital Plan.

==== CBTC installation ====
The MTA announced in early 2022 that it planned to put the contract to install communications-based train control (CBTC) on the Crosstown Line to Hoyt–Schermerhorn Streets station and modify the three interlockings on the line up for bid. The cost of the project is estimated to be $556.4 million. On May 16, 2022, the MTA put out the RFP for the design-build contract to install CBTC on the Crosstown Line. Court Square Interlocking will be modified to interface with CBTC while mechanical interlockings at Nostrand Avenue and Nassau Avenue will be replaced. Relay rooms and towers at Nostrand Avenue and Nassau Avenue will be decommissioned as part of the project. This project will include the use of axle counters instead of track circuits. Work on the project is expected to take four years. In December 2022, the MTA announced that it would award a $368 million design–build contract to Crosstown Partners, a joint venture between Thales Group and TC Electric LLC. The contract includes not only the Crosstown Line between Court Square and Bergen Street, but also the Culver Line between Bergen Street and Church Avenue. The project also included adding Wi-Fi in the tunnels.

Crosstown Partners formally received the CBTC contract in March 2023. The installation of CBTC required nighttime closures of parts of the line in late 2023 and early 2024. To accommodate the CBTC upgrades, the Crosstown Line was partially closed in three phases starting on June 28, 2024, and G service was partially suspended. Initially, the northern half of the line was closed, followed by the southern half. Additionally, 5G cellular infrastructure was added during the partial shutdown. The line fully reopened on September 3, 2024. As part of the project, the Crosstown Line tunnels used by the G train between the Court Square and Hoyt–Schermerhorn Streets stations were retrofitted with 5G cellular service, which was activated north of Bedford–Nostrand Avenues in November 2025 and south of that station in March 2026. The MTA indicated in July 2025 that the Crosstown CBTC upgrade would be delayed due to the need to add new 5G transmitters to the R211s used on the G route. In 2026, service was partially suspended during several weekends after leaks were discovered in the Newtown Creek tunnel.

== Station listing ==
Every station is served by the G train.

Station service legend
Stops all times	Stops 24 hours a day
Stops all times except late nights	Stops every day during daytime hours only
Stops late nights and weekends	Stops everyday during overnight hours and weekends during daytime hours only
Stops weekdays during the day	Stops during weekday daytime hours only
Stops rush hours in the peak direction only	Stops during weekday rush hours in the peak direction only
Time period details
Disabled access	Station is compliant with the Americans with Disabilities Act
↑	Station is compliant with the Americans with Disabilities Act in the indicated direction only
↓	Station is compliant with the Americans with Disabilities Act in the indicated direction only
	Elevator access to mezzanine only

Neighborhood (approximate)	Disabled access	Station	Services	Opened	Transfers and notes
Queens
Long Island City	Splits from the IND Queens Boulevard Line local tracks (no regular service)				
Long Island City	Disabled access	Court Square	G	August 19, 1933	IRT Flushing Line (7 <7>); IND Queens Boulevard Line (E F <F> )
Long Island City		21st Street	G	August 19, 1933	Connection to LIRR at Hunterspoint Avenue
Brooklyn
Greenpoint	Disabled access	Greenpoint Avenue	G	August 19, 1933	
Greenpoint		Nassau Avenue	G	August 19, 1933	
Williamsburg	Disabled access	Metropolitan Avenue	G	July 1, 1937	BMT Canarsie Line (L ) at Lorimer Street
Williamsburg		Broadway	G	July 1, 1937	
Williamsburg/ Bedford–Stuyvesant		Flushing Avenue	G	July 1, 1937	
Bedford–Stuyvesant		Myrtle–Willoughby Avenues	G	July 1, 1937	
Bedford–Stuyvesant		Bedford–Nostrand Avenues	G	July 1, 1937	Center track between the two island platforms
Clinton Hill		Classon Avenue	G	July 1, 1937	Additional space for a center track
Clinton Hill		Clinton–Washington Avenues	G	July 1, 1937	
Fort Greene		Fulton Street	G	July 1, 1937	
Downtown Brooklyn	Elevator access to mezzanine only	Hoyt–Schermerhorn Streets	G	July 1, 1937	IND Fulton Street Line (A C )
Merges with the IND Culver Line (G )
