= Myrtle–Willoughby Avenues station =

New York City Subway station in Brooklyn

Myrtle–Willoughby Avenues
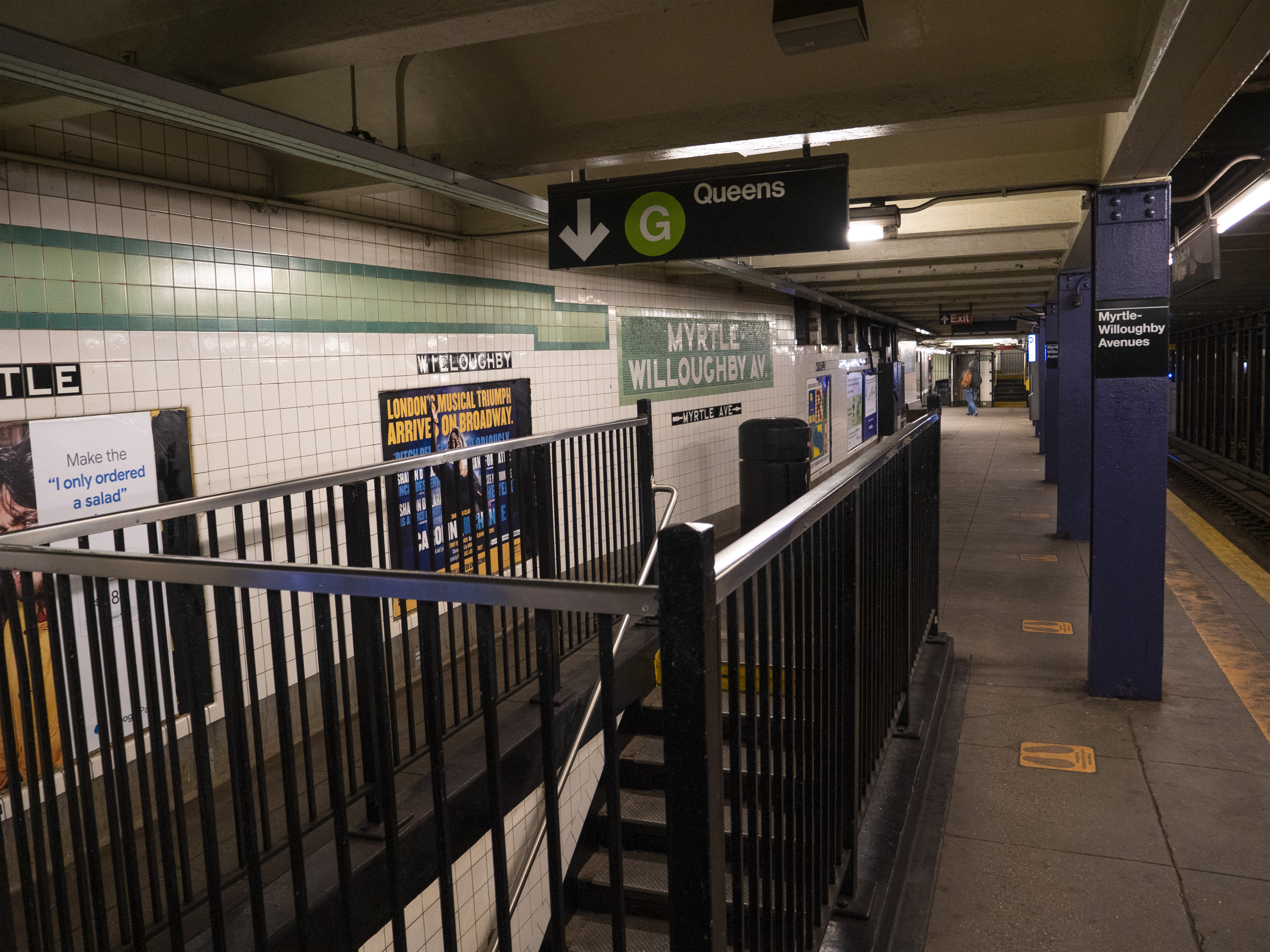
- Staircase to underpass on southbound platform

Station statistics
- Address: Myrtle Avenue & Marcy Avenue; Brooklyn, New York
- Borough: Brooklyn
- Locale: Bedford–Stuyvesant
- Coordinates: 40.694631°N 73.949103°W
- Division: B (IND)
- Line: IND Crosstown Line
- Services: G (all times)
- Transit: NYCT Bus: B54
- Structure: Underground
- Platforms: 2 side platforms
- Tracks: 2

Other information
- Opened: July 1, 1937; 89 years ago
- Accessible: No; planned

Traffic
- 2025: 1,259,021 ▲14%
- Rank: 265 out of 423
Services
Preceding station	New York City Subway	Following station
Flushing Avenue toward Court Square	G (New York City Subway service)	Bedford–Nostrand Avenues toward Church Avenue
Location
Location within New York City Subway
Location within New York City
Location within New York
Track layout
Street map
Station service legend
Symbol	Description
Stops all times	Stops all times

The Myrtle–Willoughby Avenues station is a station on the IND Crosstown Line of the New York City Subway. Located at the intersection of Myrtle and Marcy Avenues in Bedford–Stuyvesant, Brooklyn, it is served by the G train at all times. There are no open exits at Willoughby Avenue.

== History ==
This station opened on July 1, 1937, when the entire Crosstown Line was completed between Nassau Avenue and its connection to the IND Culver Line. On this date, the GG was extended in both directions to Smith–Ninth Streets and Forest Hills–71st Avenue. As part of its 2025–2029 Capital Program, the MTA has proposed making the station wheelchair-accessible in compliance with the Americans with Disabilities Act of 1990.

== Station layout ==
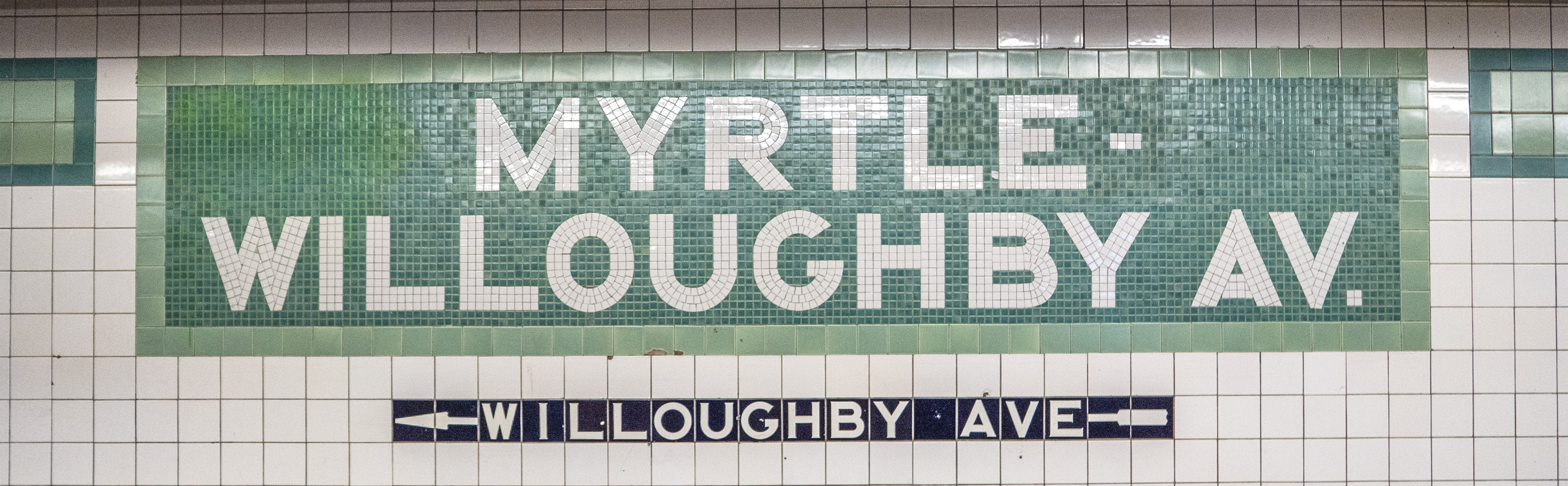
Mosaic name tablet

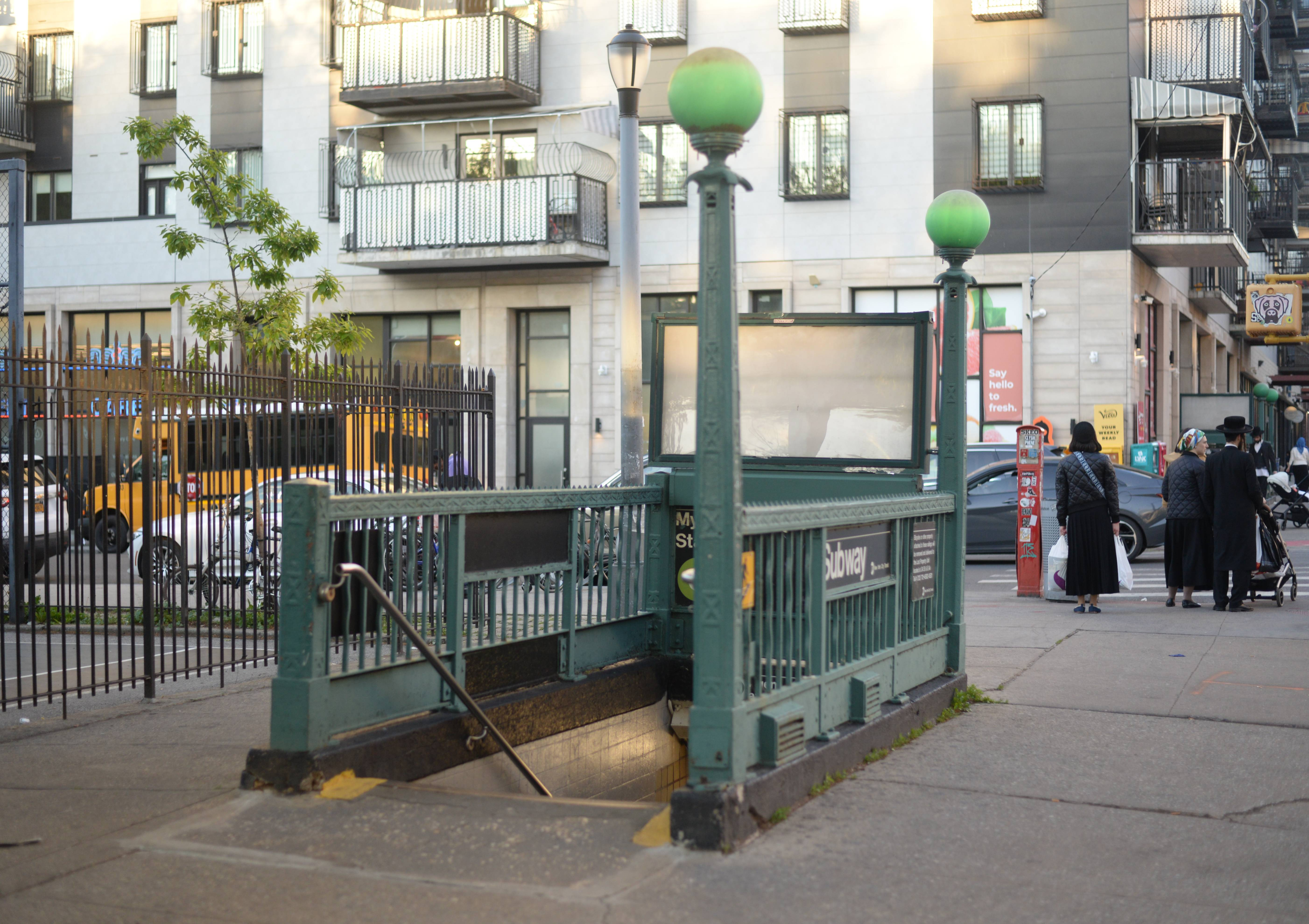
Entrance at Myrtle Ave, beside a playground.

This underground station has two tracks and two side platforms. Both platforms have a light green trim line on a dark green border that is cut up into numerous sections due to the large mosaic name tablets, which read "MYRTLE - WILLOUGHBY AV." on two lines in white sans serif lettering on a dark green background and a light green border. There are small tile directional signs in white lettering on a black background pointing to fare control below the name tablets, and station name signs in the same style run below the trim line, alternating between "MYRTLE" and "WILLOUGHBY". Vent chambers are located on the tile wall. Both platforms have blue I-beam columns at regular intervals with alternating ones having the standard black station name plate in white lettering.

=== Exits ===
The platforms each have one same-level fare control area at their north ends. The one on the Church Avenue-bound side has a bank of three turnstiles, token booth, and staircase going up to the northwest corner of Marcy and Myrtle Avenues. The one on the Queens-bound side is unstaffed, containing two High Entry/Exit turnstiles, one exit-only turnstile, and a short double-wide staircase that goes up to a short landing before a standard perpendicular staircase goes up to the northeast corner of Myrtle and Marcy Avenues. Two staircases on both platforms adjacent to fare control go down to a crossunder to allow a free transfer between directions.

Both platforms formerly had another same-level entrance/exit at their south ends and directional signs indicate they led to Willoughby Avenue. The spaces are blocked with chain link fences and some of the single street staircases on each side remain intact.
