= Flushing Avenue station (IND Crosstown Line) =

New York City Subway station in Brooklyn

Flushing Avenue
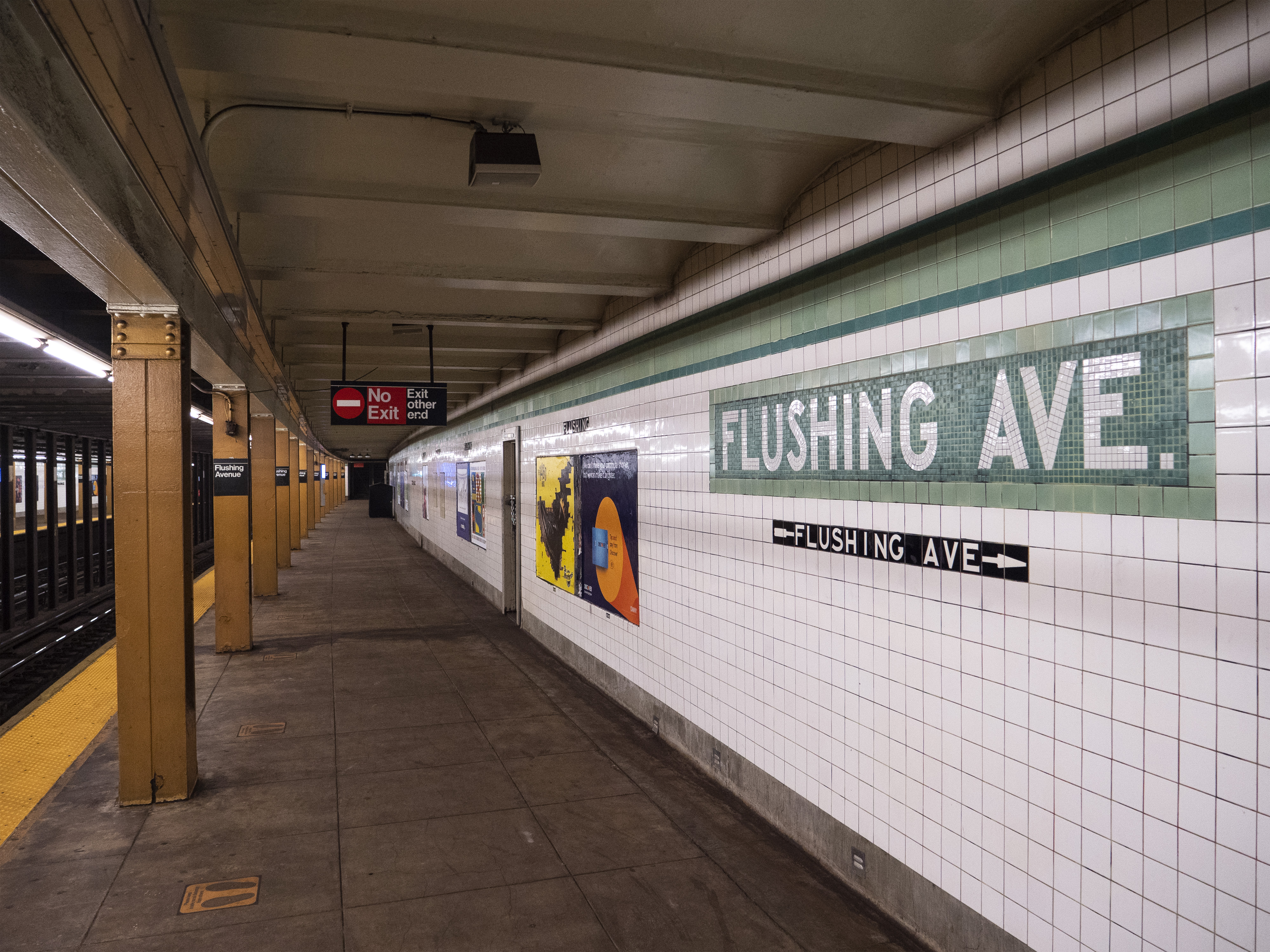
- Mosaic and curve of northbound platform

Station statistics
- Address: Flushing Avenue & Union Avenue; Brooklyn, New York
- Borough: Brooklyn
- Locale: Bedford–Stuyvesant, Williamsburg
- Coordinates: 40.699739°N 73.950176°W
- Division: B (IND)
- Line: IND Crosstown Line
- Services: G (all times)
- Transit: NYCT Bus: B57
- Structure: Underground
- Platforms: 2 side platforms
- Tracks: 2

Other information
- Opened: July 1, 1937; 89 years ago
- Accessible: No; planned

Traffic
- 2025: 748,642 ▲17.3%
- Rank: 349 out of 423
Services
Preceding station	New York City Subway	Following station
Broadway toward Court Square	G (New York City Subway service)	Myrtle–Willoughby Avenues toward Church Avenue
Location
Location within New York City Subway
Location within New York City
Location within New York
Track layout
Street map
Station service legend
Symbol	Description
Stops all times	Stops all times

The Flushing Avenue station is a station on the IND Crosstown Line of the New York City Subway. Located at the intersection of Flushing and Union/Marcy Avenues in the boundary of Bedford–Stuyvesant and Williamsburg, Brooklyn, it is served at all times by the G train.

== History ==
This station opened on July 1, 1937, when the entire Crosstown Line was completed between Nassau Avenue and its connection to the IND Culver Line. On this date, the GG was extended in both directions to Smith–Ninth Streets and Forest Hills–71st Avenue.

In 1984, after a series of robberies in the station, Pfizer, which has a plant located one block away from the station, installed four closed circuit TVs and talk-back boxes on the platforms, monitoring them from the Pfizer plant security area, reporting crimes to the local precinct and TA police. The installation was completed as part of the TA's Adopt-A-Station Program and cost $50,000. The TA added additional lighting in a stairwell and added an additional Off-Hours-Waiting Area. Shortly after the installation, several crimes were prevented. As of 1990, the emergency system resulted in 14 arrests and 5 convictions. Pfizer also helped the MTA refurbish the Brooklyn-bound platform with high-entry turnstiles, security gates, and new railings. New artwork was also added to the station.

Under the 2015–2019 Metropolitan Transportation Authority Capital Program, this station, along with 32 others, would have undergone a complete overhaul as part of the Enhanced Station Initiative. Updates would have included cellular service, Wi-Fi, USB charging stations, interactive service advisories and maps, and improved signage and station lighting. However, most of these renovations are being deferred until the 2020–2024 Capital Program due to a lack of funding. The MTA announced in April 2024 that it would make esthetic improvements to the station during mid-2024 as part of its Re-New-Vation program, while the line was temporarily closed for construction. As part of its 2025–2029 Capital Program, the MTA has proposed making the station wheelchair-accessible in compliance with the Americans with Disabilities Act of 1990.

== Station layout ==
This underground station has two tracks and two side platforms. The G stops at the station at all times. The station is between Broadway to the north and Myrtle–Willoughby Avenues to the south.

Both platforms have a light green trim line on a dark green border and mosaic name tablets reading "FLUSHING AVE." in white sans serif lettering on a dark green background and light green border. Underneath the trim line and name tablets are tile captions and direction signs in white lettering on a black background. The tiles were part of a color-coded tile system used throughout the IND. The tile colors were designed to facilitate navigation for travelers going away from Lower Manhattan. Because the Crosstown Line does not merge into a line that enters Manhattan at either end, all stations on the line had green tiles. Yellow I-beams run along both platforms are regular intervals, alternating ones having the standard black station name plate with white lettering.

=== Exits ===
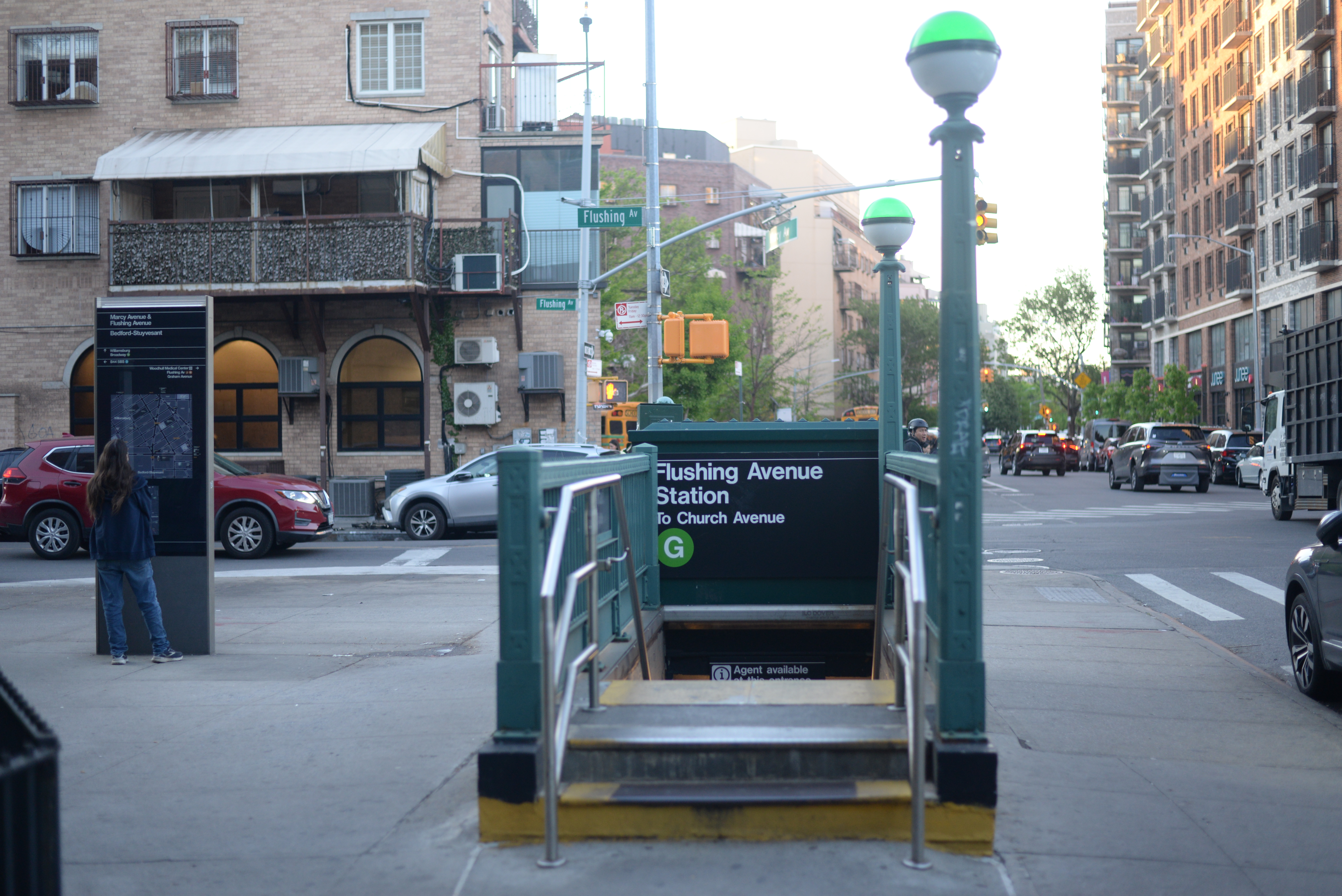
Northbound staircase

The platforms each have one same-level fare control area at their south ends, and there are no crossovers or crossunders to allow a free transfer between directions. Each area has a turnstile bank, two full-height turnstiles (one exit-only and the other high entry/exit), token booth, and one staircase to the street. The one on the southbound side goes up to the southwest corner of Flushing and Marcy Avenues while the one on the Queens-bound side goes up to the northeast corner of Union Avenue (which becomes Marcy Avenue at the intersection of Flushing Avenue) and Gerry Street (which begins diagonally at the aforementioned intersection). The turnstile bank and token booth on the southbound platform is only open on weekdays and the two full-height turnstiles provide entrance to and exit from the station at other times.

The station formerly had another exit at the north end as proven by one gated staircase on each platform going up. Directional signs indicate that this mezzanine and crossover, which are now used for storage and employee space, led to both southern corners of Walton Street and Union Avenue. Both staircases were eventually sealed, and the one to the southwestern corner was partly demolished during the construction of new buildings.
