= Contingent self-esteem =

Self-esteem based on the approval of others

Contingent self-esteem (CSE) is self-esteem based on the approval of others or on social comparisons. Certain events will shape one's self-esteem when the individual bases their self-worth on the outcome of those events. The success or failure of any situation can result in fluctuations of an individual's self-esteem. A manifestation of someone with contingent self-esteem is excessive self-consciousness. Such excessive self-consciousness, as occurs with contingent self-esteem, involves extreme criticism of one's self, concern of how they are perceived by their peers, and feelings of discomfort in social settings. One's self-esteem is directly affected when domains of contingencies are used to measure one's self-worth. Self-esteem can also be affected when an individual compares their appearance or success to that of someone else or when their self-esteem is contingent to the relationships around them.

== Self-esteem and contingent self-worth ==
According to William James in his journal The Principles of Psychology, self-esteem can be a stable and unstable trait. An individual's self-esteem fluctuates in response to different events. Men and women alike are also selective about which events affect their self-esteem. This instability of self-esteem is the result of having contingent self-worth. Good and bad events can momentarily raise or lower feelings of self-esteem. Those fluctuations can cause an individual to seek those positive feelings associated with success and avoid the negative feelings associated with failure. Therefore, contingencies of self-worth have control over one's behavior.

Students who base their self-esteem on their academic successes use their school work to prove their intelligence. Since failures in domains of contingency have negative effects on one's self-esteem, students will avoid failure by increasing their effort, by abandoning their goals and becoming completely unmotivated, or by making excuses to lessen the impact on their self-esteem. In Jennifer Crocker's journal Contingencies of self-worth: Implications for self-regulation and psychological vulnerability, the author states that contingencies of self-worth are used as a source of motivation and a psychological vulnerability. This means that contingencies of self-worth can cause one to strive for success or weaken one's self-esteem. Contingencies of self-worth are associated with validation of one's abilities in the domain of contingency, and students spend more time on activities related to their specific domains of contingency. When individuals have self-validation goals, mistakes, failures, criticism, and negative feedback are seen as threats rather than learning opportunities. A solution would be to replace self-validating goals with learning goals. Adopting goals that are good for the individual as well as others around them may lessen the impact of contingent self-esteem.

== Appearance related social comparisons ==
People with high levels of CSE are prone to making social comparisons based on appearance. As a result, these individuals more than often feel diminished. Appearance related social comparisons are comparisons of one's perceived appearance to the appearance of other people. Those who make social comparisons base their feelings of self-worth on meeting social standards and expectations. Appearance related social comparisons can affect one's self-esteem in both positive and negative ways. On the positive side, appearance related social comparisons can help develop and maintain one's level of self-worth. On the negative side, appearance related social comparisons can cause the decline of an individual's self-worth and value. Women who measure their self-worth based on cultural standards may be affected more by social comparisons, particularly when they have a low self-perception of attractiveness.

Images in the media are notorious for creating unrealistic standards of beauty, most especially for women. Comparisons with media standards can cause an individual with high levels of CSE to acquire feelings of inadequacy. Mass media provides examples of beauty that are often unattainable by the average male or female. Although this is true in most cases, everyone is not equally affected by unrealistic standards of beauty in the media and social comparisons with the people they are surrounded by. One's self-perception of appearance is how an individual measures their own beauty. Women with lower self-perceptions of appearance tend to be more dissatisfied after viewing "ideal" images of women in the media. This same issue can also be seen in the male population but isn't as prevalent and widespread as in the female population. In the journal "Media Images and Women's Self-evaluations", researchers D. Henderson-King, E. Henderson-King, and L. Hoffman demonstrated that the importance that women place on physical attractiveness is associated with images displayed in the media.

=== Body image ===
Body image is a very important developmental concern for children and young adults. Contingent self-esteem in this area is shown when one's self-image is contingent upon the approval of others, meeting social expectations, or other criteria. Individuals with higher levels of contingent self-esteem are more likely to view acceptance from others as contingent upon the ideal standard for body image. Individuals who base their self-worth upon contingencies of outer image often spend a lot of time trying to reach standards for appearance and obtain social acceptance. This constant self-evaluation has a negative relationship on one's mental health.

Body mass index (BMI) has a great influence on the attitudes and behaviors in men and women. Women in the westernized society believe being thin is the cultural norm, while men are striving to gain weight and muscles. Both men and women are striving for a lower BMI in order to fit in with "society". Joel R. Grossbard, Christine M. Lee, Clayton Neighbors, and Mary E. Larimer did a study to investigate gender differences in body image concerns, and the influence of contingent self-esteem on body dissatisfaction. The results proved that female college students focused more on weight/body shape, while male students focused on muscularity. When the association of contingent self-esteem and weight/body shape was examined, evidence proved higher levels of contingent self-esteem is more strongly associated with greater concern regarding weight/body shape in females in comparison to males. In contrast, when the association of contingent self-esteem and muscularity was examined, evidence proved higher levels of contingent self-esteem is associated more with greater concern regarding muscle gain in males in comparison to females.

== Relationship contingent self-esteem ==
Relationship contingent self-esteem (RCSE) is a psychological disorder that has been researched by Chip Knee and his colleagues at the University of Houston. RCSE is the way one determines how they feel about themselves based on the outcome of their relationship. Individuals with RCSE take problems in their relationship personally. They do not tend to think rationally about situations, which may result to them feeling bad for themselves in the end. Any setback in a relationship can lead to many negative feelings such as depression, anxiety, and changes in mood. Individuals with high levels of relationship based self-esteem are highly committed to their relationships, but become devastated when faced with challenges in their relationship. In extreme cases, they may resort to hurting or killing themselves. RCSE is seen as a negative and unhealthy factor of a relationship, which can be mediated if identified in its early stages.

Chip Knee and a group of researchers also studied heterosexual relationships in college and how they are affected by RCSE. They presented the results of this study in a paper entitled "Relationship Contingent Self-Esteem – The Ups and Downs of Romantic Relationship". RCSE was present in some of these relationships; however, some levels were higher than others. Relationships with higher levels of RCSE are placed under unnecessary strain. The point of the study is to show how relationships can guide one's thoughts, emotions, and behaviors; and the unhealthy way people attach themselves to relationships.
