= Larimer =

Larimer may refer to:

== Places ==
- Larimer County, Colorado
- Larimer Hill, Indiana
- Larimer, Pennsylvania
- Larimer Square, Denver
- Larimer Township, Somerset County, Pennsylvania
- Larimer (Pittsburgh), a neighborhood in city of Pittsburgh

== Other uses ==
- Larimer (surname)
- Larimer Memorial Library, Palatka, Florida, on the National Register of Historic Places
- Larimer School, Pittsburgh, Pennsylvania, on the National Register of Historic Places
- 12073 Larimer, an asteroid
