= Lorimar =

Lorimar may refer to:

- Lorimar Television, previously Lorimar Productions and later Lorimar Distribution, an American film and television production and marketing company from 1969 to 1986
- Lorimar-Telepictures, formed in 1986 after the merger of Lorimar Television and Telepictures, purchased by Warner Bros. in 1989
- The Lorimar Sports Network, an ad hoc sports broadcast syndication network owned by the Lorimar Television
- Lorimar Studios, one of four former names of the Sony Pictures Studios, an American film and television studio lot when it was owned by Lorimar-Telepictures

== See also ==
- Lorimer (disambiguation)
