= Lorimer =

Lorimer may refer to:

== Surname ==
- Lorimer (surname)

== Middle name ==
- James Lorimer Ilsley (1894–1967), Canadian politician and jurist
- John Lorimer Worden (1818–1897), U.S. Admiral who served in the American Civil War

== Other uses ==
- Lorimer Park, a public park in Abington Township, Pennsylvania, United States
- New York City Subway stations in Brooklyn, New York City, New York, United States:
  - Lorimer Street (BMT Canarsie Line), serving the L train
  - Lorimer Street (BMT Jamaica Line), serving the J and M trains
- Lorimer's method, a technique for evaluating slope stability in cohesive soils
- Lorimer burst, a fast radio burst

== See also ==
- Lorimar Television, an American television production company
- Lorimier (disambiguation)
- Larimer (disambiguation)
