= Metropolitan Avenue/Lorimer Street station =

New York City Subway station in Brooklyn

Metropolitan Avenue/ Lorimer Street
- New York City Subway station complex
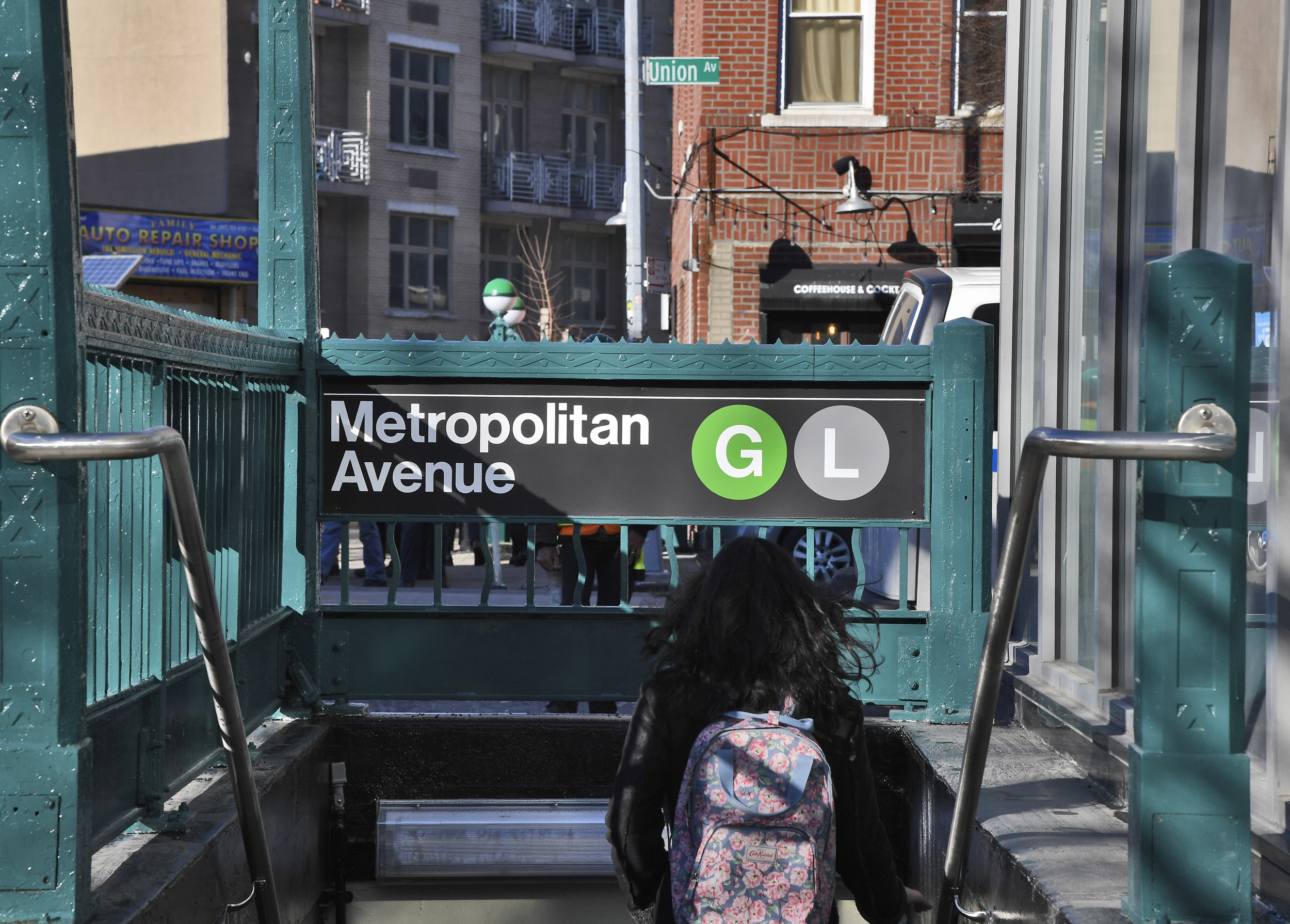

Station statistics
- Address: Metropolitan Avenue between Lorimer Street & Union Avenue; Brooklyn, New York
- Borough: Brooklyn
- Locale: Williamsburg
- Coordinates: 40.712752°N 73.951464°W
- Division: BMT/IND
- Line: BMT Canarsie Line; IND Crosstown Line
- Services: G (all times); L (all times)
- Transit: NYCT Bus: B24, B48, Q59
- Levels: 2

Other information
- Opened: July 1, 1948; 78 years ago
- Accessible: Yes (Transfer passageway between IND Crosstown Line platforms and BMT Canarsie Line platforms is not accessible; OMNY farecard readers must be used for free accessible transfer)

Traffic
- 2025: 4,685,664 ▲15%
- Rank: 65 out of 423
Location
Location within New York City Subway
Location within New York City
Location within New York
Street map
Station service legend
Symbol	Description
Stops all times	Stops all times

The Metropolitan Avenue/Lorimer Street station is an underground New York City Subway station complex shared by the BMT Canarsie Line and the IND Crosstown Line. Located in the Williamsburg neighborhood of Brooklyn, the complex is served by the G and L trains at all times.

The BMT Canarsie Line platforms, which are named Lorimer Street, are located above the IND Crosstown Line platforms, which are named Metropolitan Avenue. The Canarsie Line station opened in 1924, and the Crosstown Line station opened in 1937. Free transfers between the stations started in 1948.

== History ==
Contract 4 of the Dual Contracts, adopted on March 4, 1913, between New York City and the Brooklyn Rapid Transit Company (BRT; later the Brooklyn–Manhattan Transit Corporation, or BMT), included a subway route under 14th Street, to run to Canarsie in Brooklyn; this became the BMT's Canarsie Line. Booth and Flinn was awarded the first contract for the line, namely a tunnel under the East River, in January 1916. That May, the commission reviewed bids for section 4, running from Bedford Avenue to Manhattan Avenue in Brooklyn, including the Lorimer Street station; Mason and Hanger submitted a low bid of $1.847 million for this section. The Station Finish Corporation was contracted to build the stations in Brooklyn. Track-laying in the tunnels between Sixth and Montrose Avenues started in the last week of October 1922. On June 30, 1924, the section between Sixth Avenue in Manhattan and Montrose Avenue in Brooklyn opened, including the Lorimer Street station.

Plans for a crosstown subway line were floated as early as 1912. In 1923, a plan for such a line, to be operated by the BRT was adopted by the city, but Mayor John Francis Hylan announced his opposition to it the next year. Eventually, the line was moved and incorporated into the city's Independent Subway System (IND). The Metropolitan Avenue station opened when the section of the Crosstown Line south of Nassau Avenue was completed and connected to the IND Culver Line on July 1, 1937.

Originally, passengers who wished to transfer between the Canarsie and Crosstown lines had to pay a separate fare, because the BMT and IND were competing companies. On July 1, 1948, eight years after the three operators of New York's subways were unified into a single entity, the transfer passageway was reconfigured to be inside fare control, thus permitting free transfers between lines.

In 2019, the MTA announced that the station would become ADA-accessible as part of the agency's 2020–2024 Capital Program. A contract for five elevators at the station (three for the Canarsie Line platforms and two for the Crosstown Line platforms) was awarded in December 2020. A street-to-mezzanine elevator for the Crosstown Line platforms was added to the contract, resulting in a total of six elevators. All elevators opened on April 1, 2024. The transfer passageway between the Canarsie and Crosstown lines is not accessible, so an out-of-system transfer for disabled riders is provided using OMNY farecard readers. The passageway to the Manhattan-bound Canarsie Line platform has stairs, and the passageway to the Canarsie-bound platform has a ramp that is not accessible.

== Station layout ==
The L-shaped passageway, located above the Crosstown Line at its northern end and below the Canarsie Line at its western end, also serves as the mezzanine for the Crosstown Line's lower level. When viewed from the Crosstown Line mezzanine, the passageway splits up as the right half leads to a ramp for Canarsie-bound trains while the left half leads to a crossunder to Eighth Avenue-bound trains.

A precinct of the New York City Transit Police is also located on the Crosstown Line mezzanine.

=== Artwork ===
The artwork in the transfer passageway and the Crosstown Line mezzanine is called Signs of Life, designed by Jackie Chang in 2000. Signs of Life is made of ceramic tiles of glass and consists of numerous juxtaposed words and icons. The words in the artwork are compound words that have been taken apart, such as "useless" or "mankind". In designing the artwork, Chang intended for the pieces to be "challenging" and cryptic. Signs of Life originally consisted of six mosaics, but two additional mosaics were added when the station's elevators opened in 2024.

The Lorimer Street station's fare control area also contains the artwork Personal Choice #5, designed by Chloë Bass and completed in 2024. The artwork is split up into three sections and depicts human connections and touch. Each portion of Personal Choice #5 is accompanied by a text caption, which is overlaid atop the artwork.

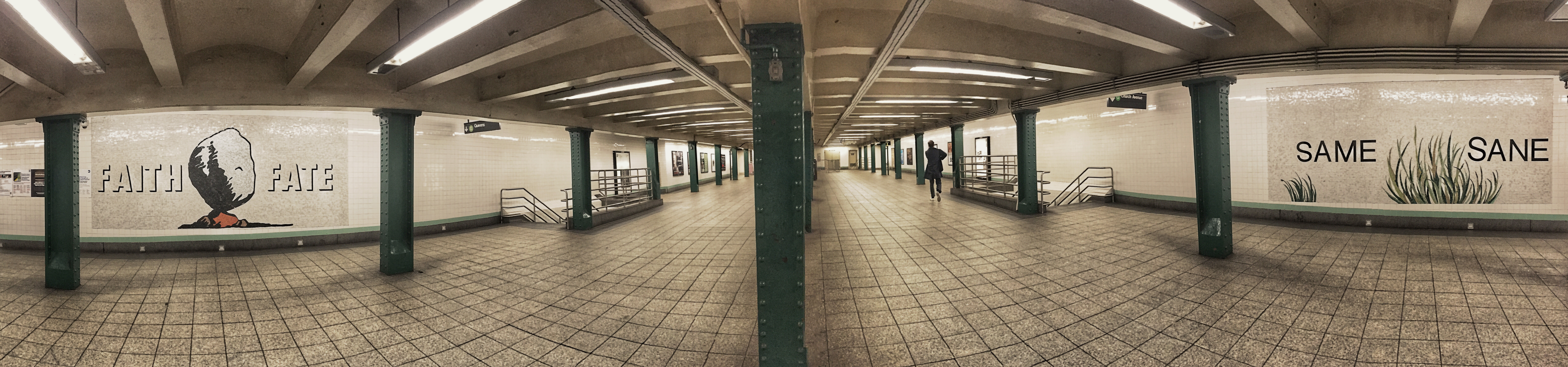
Panoramic view of the mezzanine

=== Exits ===
The main entrances at the corner of Metropolitan and Union Avenues lead to the transfer corridor between the lines. The high entry-exit turnstiles in the transfer corridor would be replaced with waist-high "low turnstiles" to accommodate increased passenger flow.

Each platform has a second set of entrances. The BMT platforms have a second set to the eastern corners of Lorimer Street and Metropolitan Avenue at their east ends. The IND platforms have one stair leading to the northwestern corner of Union Avenue and Hope Street and another leading to the northeastern corner of Union Avenue and Powers Street. The exits to Powers and Hope Streets were previously closed in 2000 due to safety concerns, blocked by metal street grates, and used as emergency exits. They were reopened on February 28, 2019, to accommodate the increased volume of passengers transferring between the Crosstown and Canarsie Line stations due to the 14th Street Tunnel shutdown. Originally, only one of these exits was planned to be reopened.

Despite the IND station's name on tiling, there is no longer an open exit to Grand Street. A passage beyond the Hope and Powers Streets exits leads to two more exits that led to both northern corners of Grand Street and Union Avenue. These exits were also closed in 2000 due to safety concerns. While the exit to the northeastern corner is also blocked by a metal sheet grate, the exit to the northwestern corner has been sealed and is inaccessible from street level. The exits to Grand Street were open until the section of the mezzanine that had the exits to Hope Street and Powers Street was closed; this is corroborated by photos of this portion of the mezzanine during its closure, which had signage directing to Grand Street intact, as well as MTA documents outlining the closure of the whole area.

The BMT station previously had two closed exits; they led to the western corners of Lorimer Street and Metropolitan Avenue. They were also closed in 2000 and were repurposed into emergency exits. As part of the ADA accessibility improvements, the exit to the southwestern corner was reopened, while the exit to the northwestern corner was demolished to make room for a street elevator at that corner.

The transfer mezzanine also features one closed staircase to the southeastern corner of Metropolitan Avenue and Union Avenue. The staircase was also closed in 2000, but has been completely sealed from both the street level and the mezzanine level.

== BMT Canarsie Line platforms ==
Lorimer Street
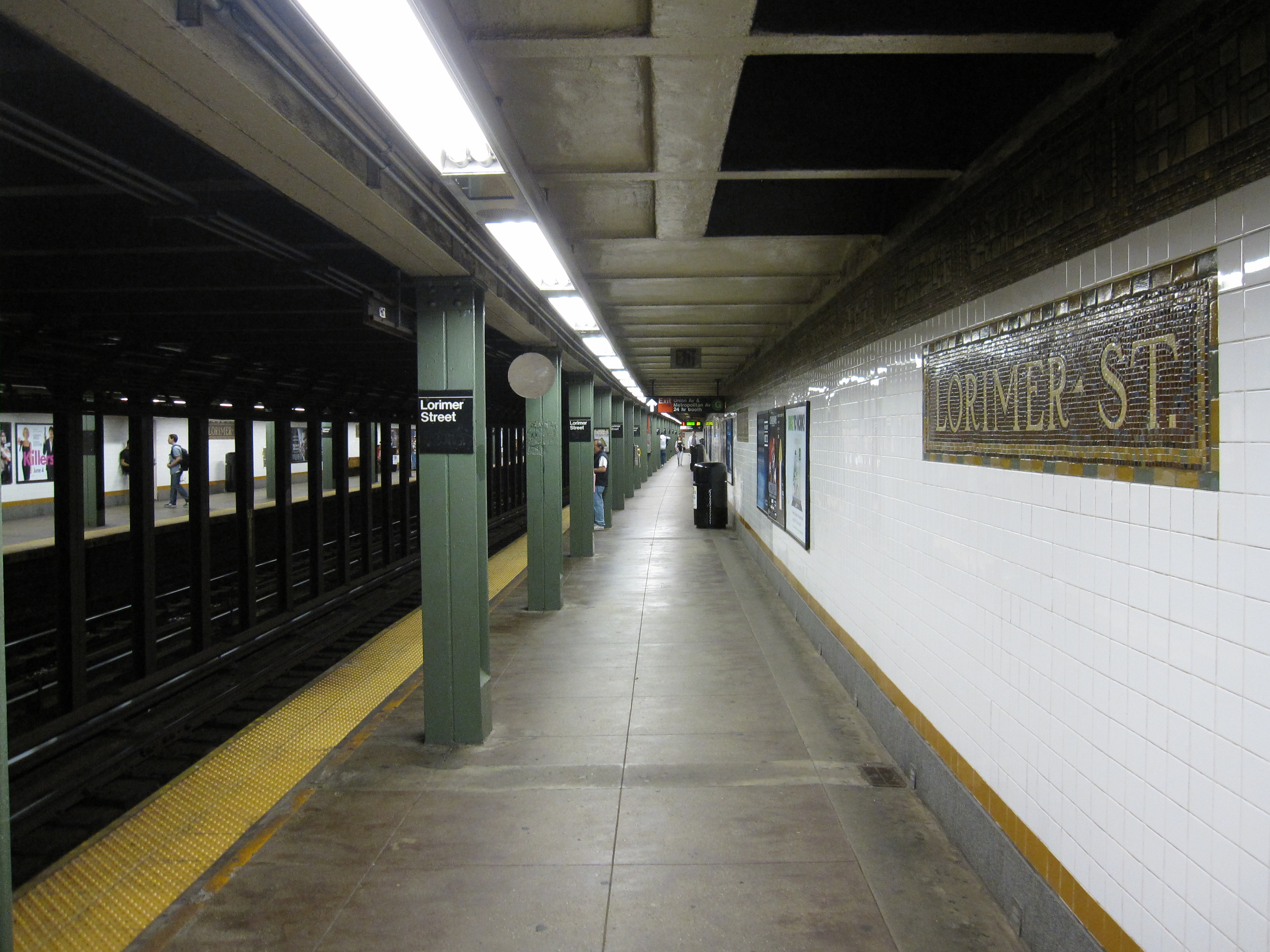
- Northbound platform

Station statistics
- Division: B (BMT)
- Line: BMT Canarsie Line
- Services: L (all times)
- Structure: Underground
- Platforms: 2 side platforms
- Tracks: 2

Other information
- Opened: June 30, 1924; 102 years ago
- Accessible: Yes (Use OMNY farecard readers to transfer to IND Crosstown Line platforms)
Services
Preceding station	New York City Subway	Following station
Bedford Avenue toward Eighth Avenue	L (New York City Subway service)	Graham Avenue toward Canarsie–Rockaway Parkway
Track layout
Station service legend
Symbol	Description
Stops all times	Stops all times

The Lorimer Street station (announced as the Metropolitan Avenue-Lorimer Street station) on the BMT Canarsie Line has two tracks and two side platforms. It opened on June 30, 1924, as part of the initial segment of the underground Canarsie Line, a product of the Dual Contracts, stretching from Sixth Avenue in Manhattan to Montrose Avenue. The L stops at the station at all times. The station is between Bedford Avenue to the west and Graham Avenue to the east. Fixed platform barriers, which are intended to prevent passengers falling to the tracks, are positioned near the platform edges.

The Lorimer Street entry point has a mezzanine above the station. There is also another entrance at Union Avenue that leads directly to the Manhattan-bound platform. The transfer to the Crosstown Line is toward the Union Avenue (western; railroad northern) end of the station, where passageways descend from each platform to the Union Avenue mezzanine.

=== Image gallery ===
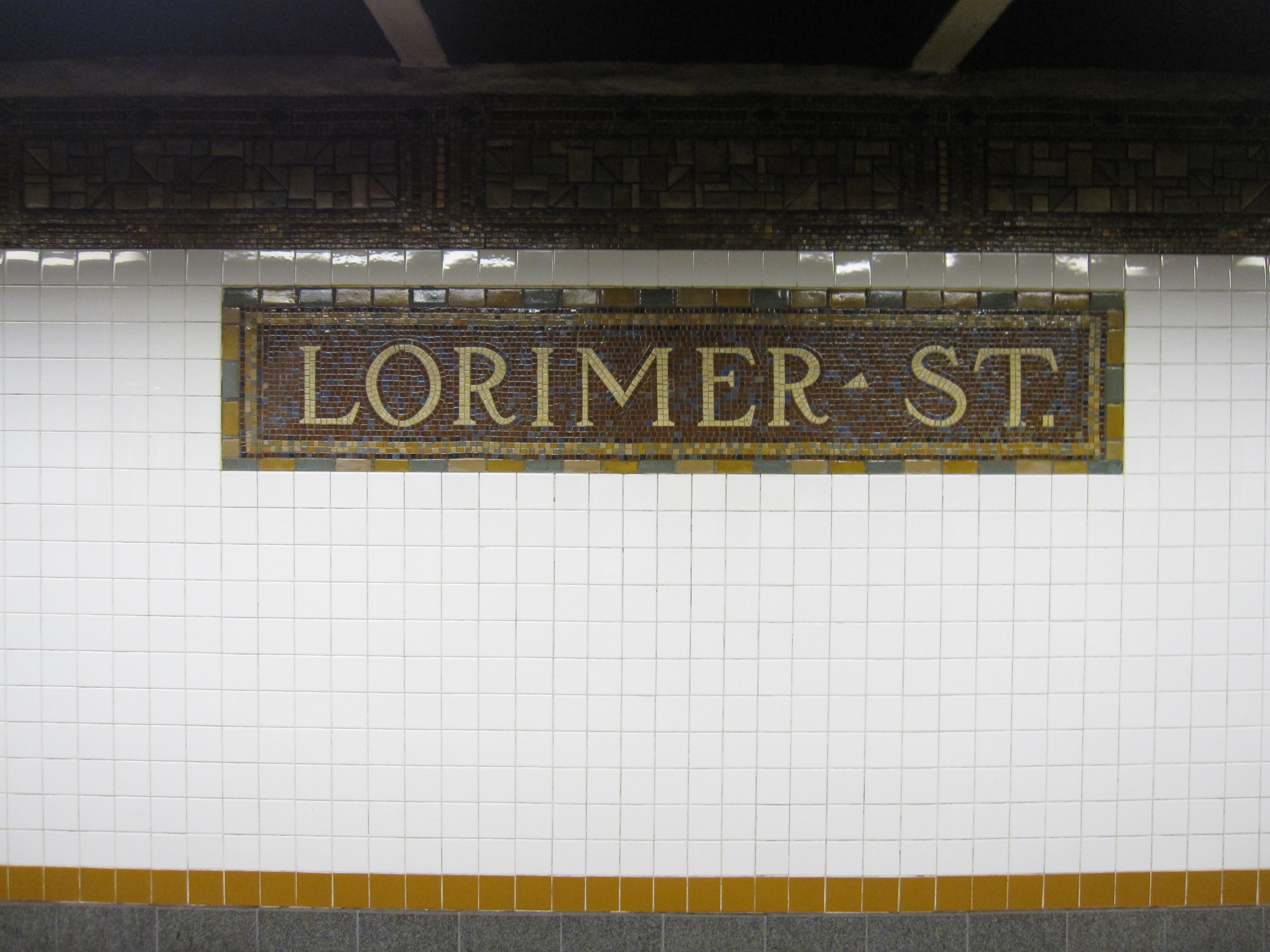
Lorimer Street full-name mosaic

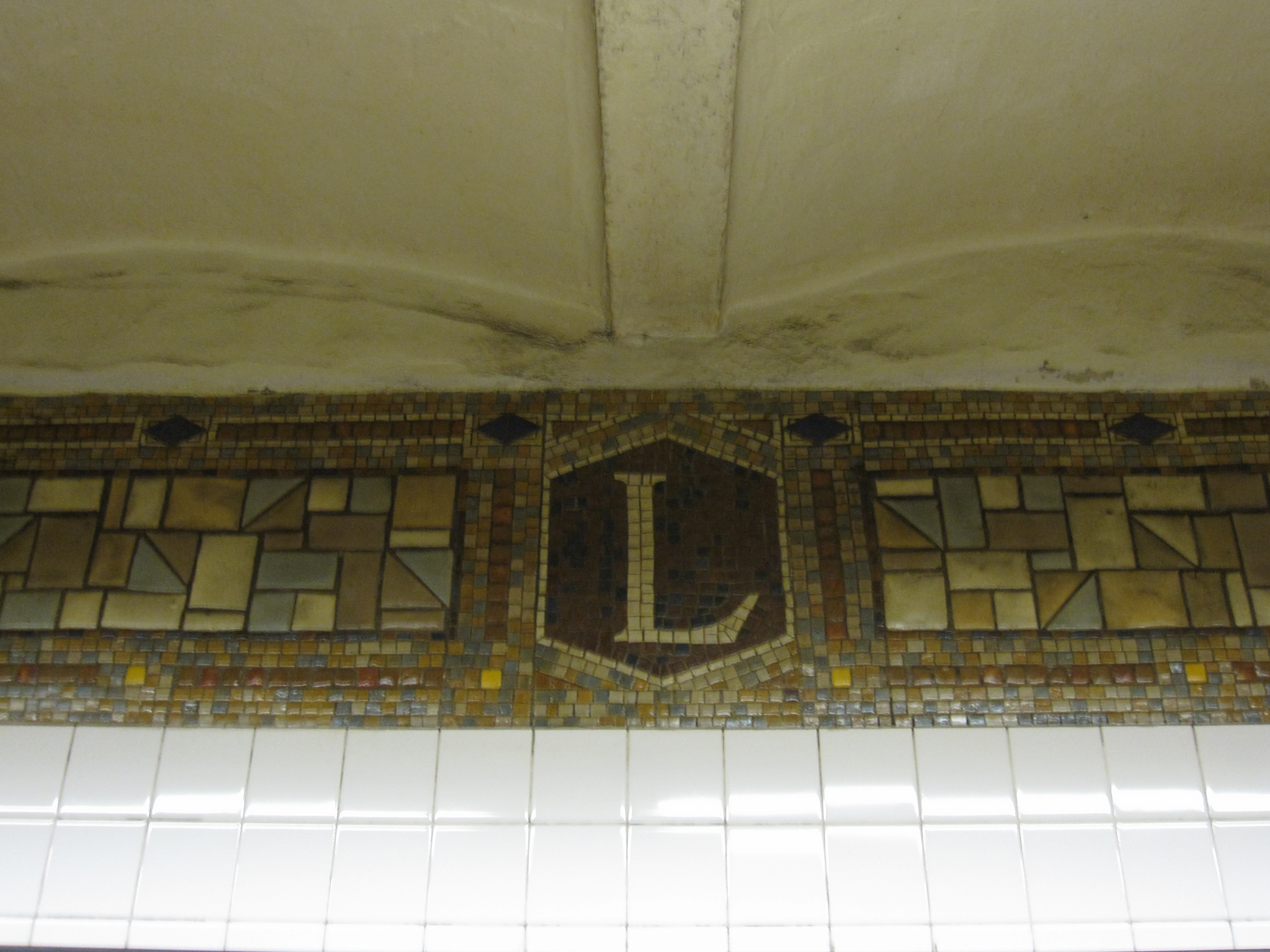
Lorimer Street "L" mosaic

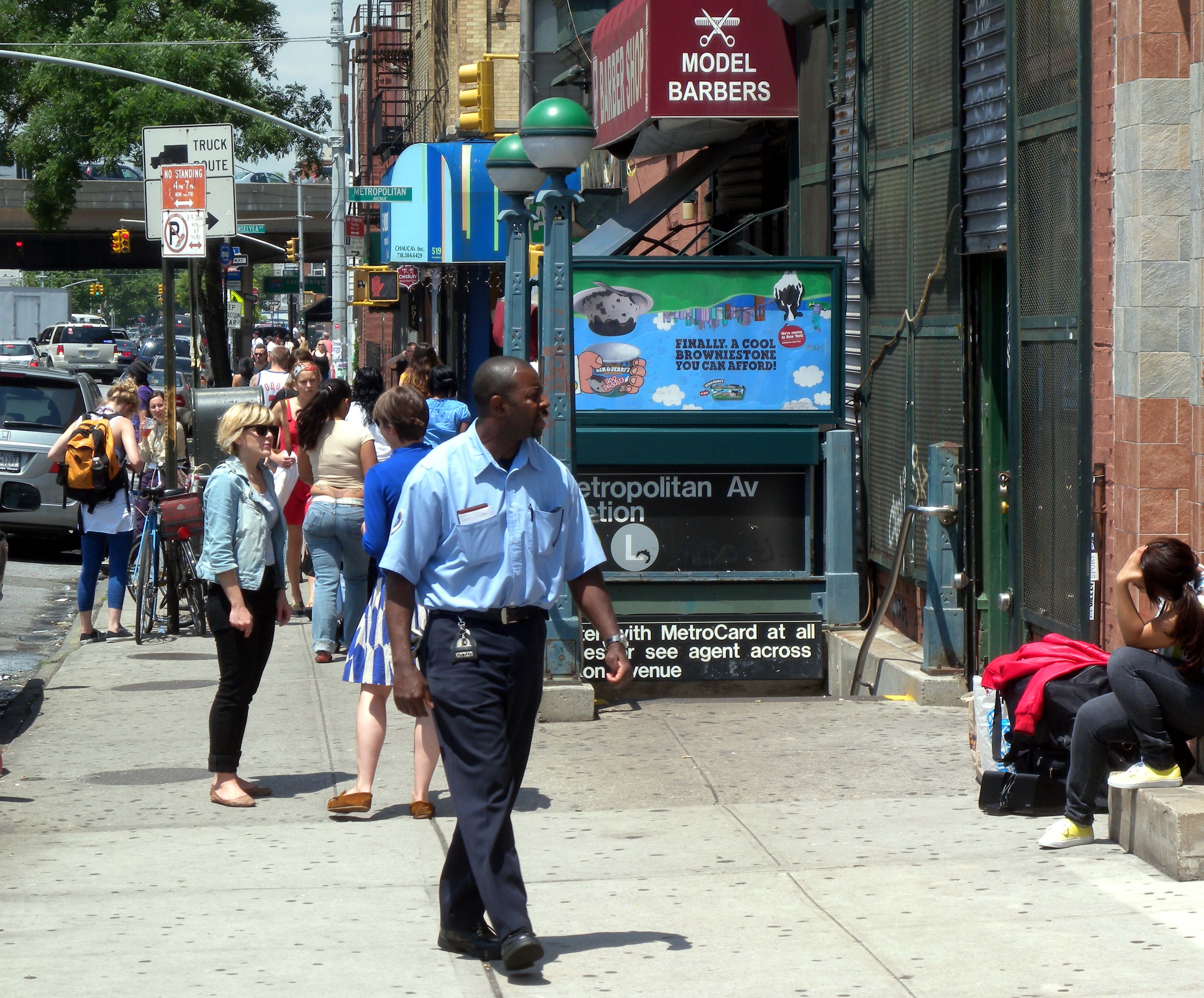
Metropolitan Avenue stair

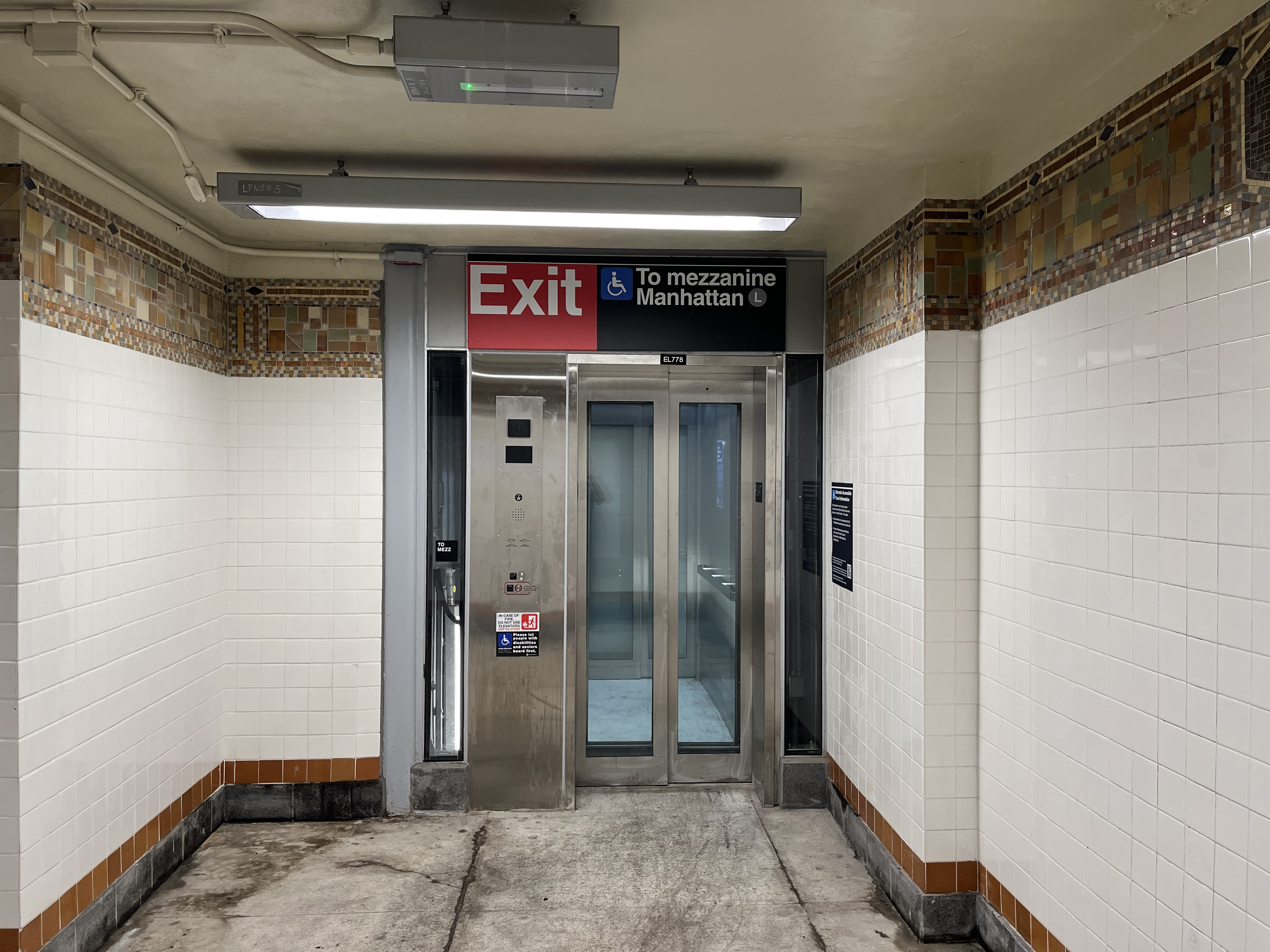
Elevator from the southbound platform

== IND Crosstown Line platforms ==
Metropolitan Avenue
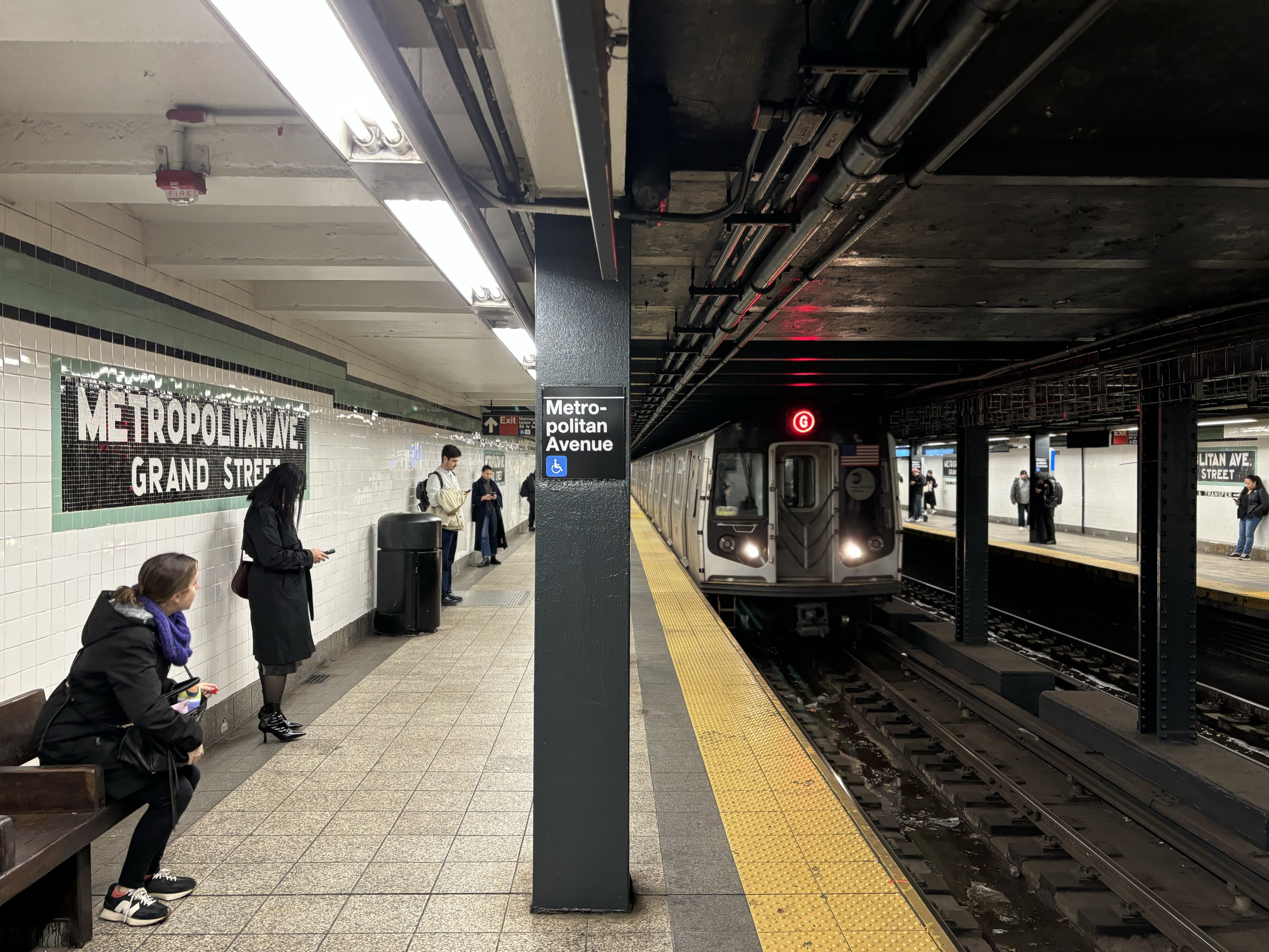
- Southbound R160 G train arriving

Station statistics
- Division: B (IND)
- Line: IND Crosstown Line
- Services: G (all times)
- Structure: Underground
- Platforms: 2 side platforms
- Tracks: 2

Other information
- Opened: July 1, 1937; 89 years ago
- Accessible: Yes (Use OMNY farecard readers to transfer to BMT Canarsie Line platforms)
- Former/other names: Metropolitan Avenue–Grand Street
Services
Preceding station	New York City Subway	Following station
Nassau Avenue toward Court Square	G (New York City Subway service)	Broadway toward Church Avenue
Track layout
Station service legend
Symbol	Description
Stops all times	Stops all times

The Metropolitan Avenue station (also announced as the Metropolitan Avenue-Lorimer Street station) on the IND Crosstown Line opened on July 1, 1937, as part of the extension of the Crosstown Line from Nassau Avenue to Hoyt-Schermerhorn Streets. The station also has two tracks and two side platforms. The G stops at the station at all times. The station is between Nassau Avenue to the north and Broadway to the south.

The station has green tiles. The tiles were part of a color-coded tile system used throughout the IND. The tile colors were designed to facilitate navigation for travelers going away from Lower Manhattan. Because the Crosstown Line does not merge into a line that enters Manhattan at either end, all stations on the line had green tiles. Station tile signage retains the original name of the station: Metropolitan Avenue–Grand Street. Directional tile captions mimicking the style of original IND captions indicate "To Street and Transfer;" the tile captions replaced original captions pointing to Metropolitan Avenue at the north end and Grand Street at the south end. Two staircases from the north end of either platform lead to the mezzanine and transfer passageway to the BMT Canarsie Line.

The mezzanine is full-length, but has been reduced in size. A central portion was closed in the late 1990s and is now occupied by a police facility, employee space, and offices. The south portion was also previously closed and used as storage space, but was reopened on February 28, 2019, in preparation for the 14th Street Tunnel shutdown in April 2019. A previously removed staircase between the southbound platform and the mezzanine was also built.

=== Image gallery ===
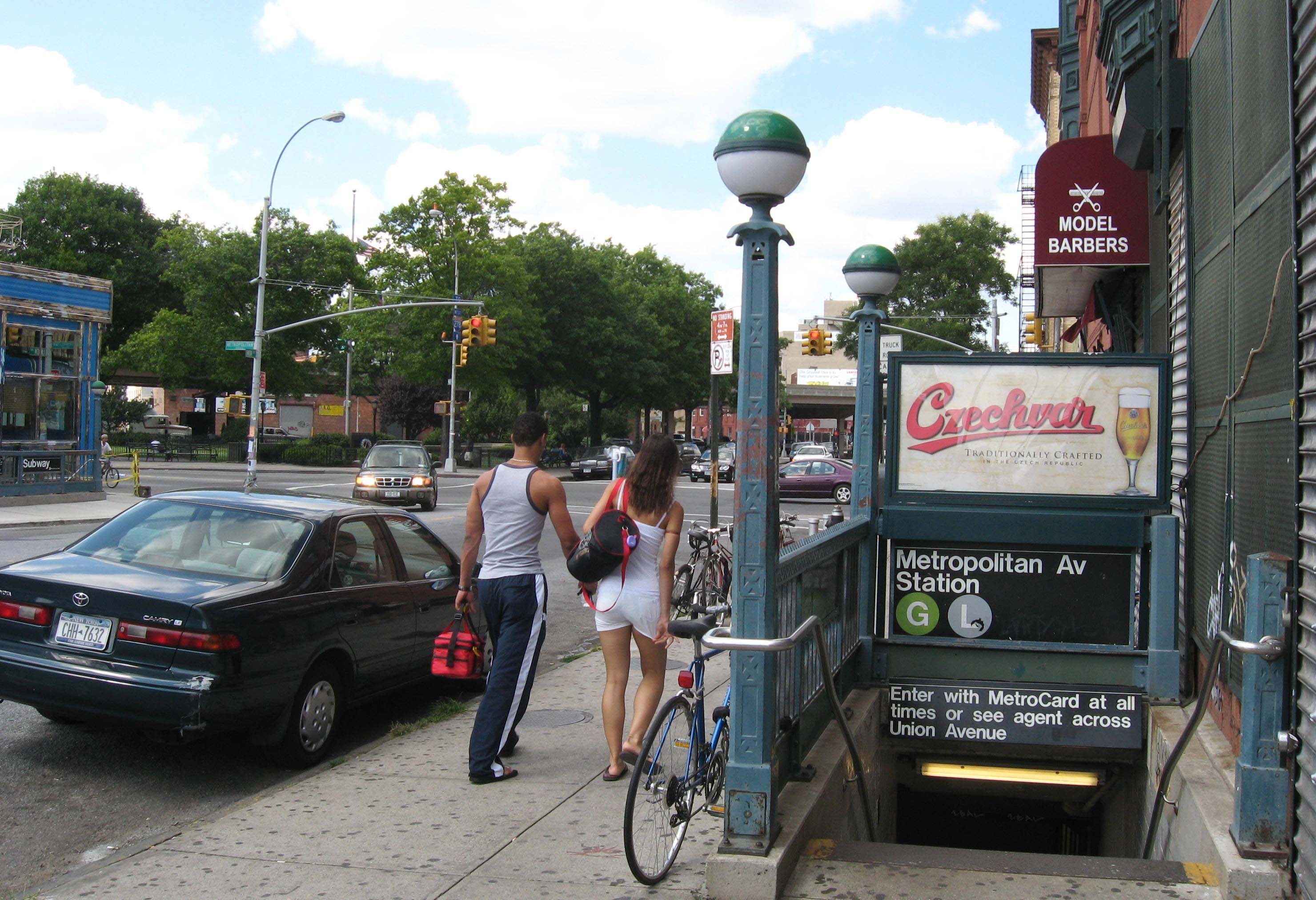
Street stair at southeast corner of Metropolitan & Union Avenues

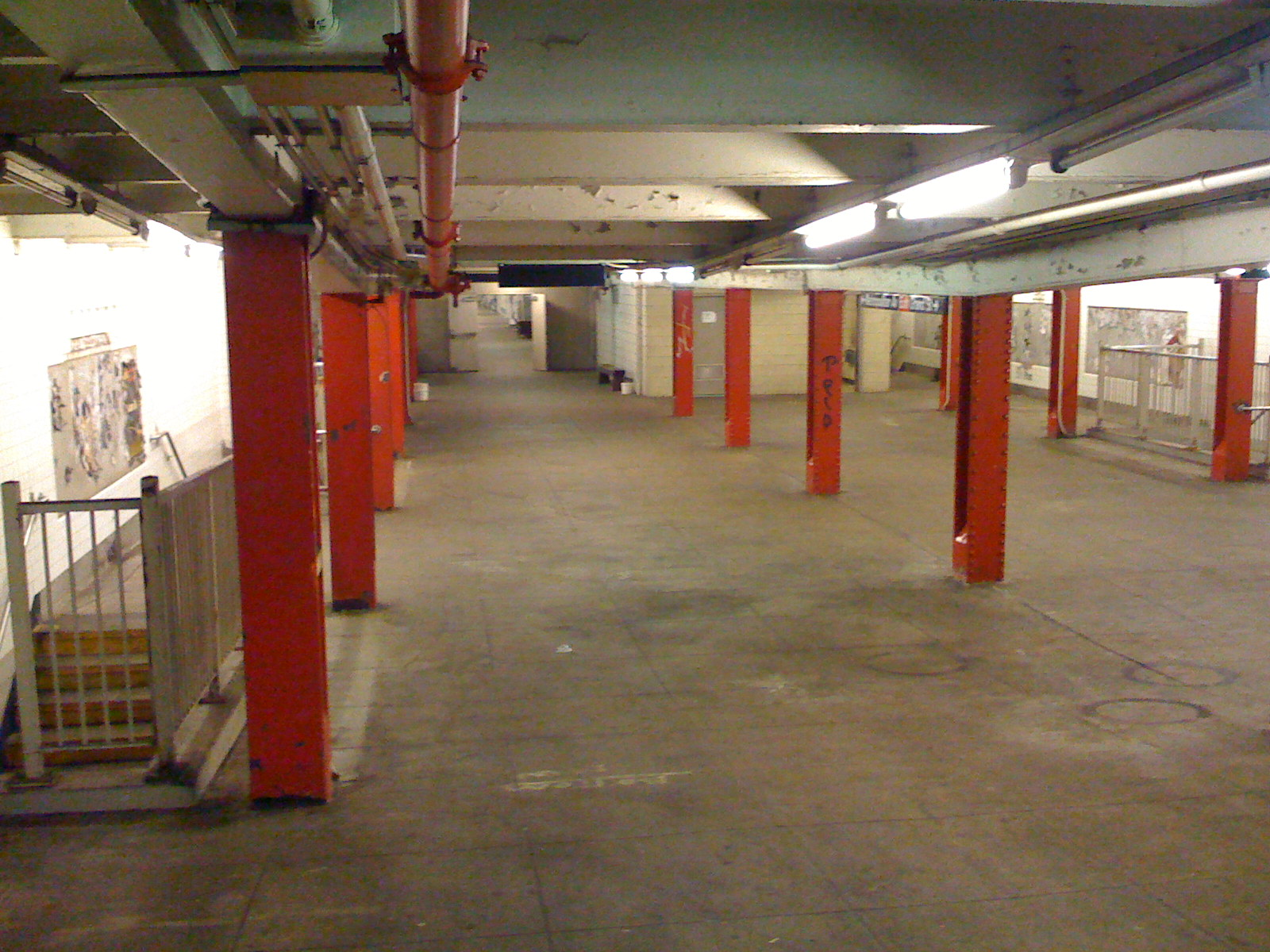
Closed southern portion of the mezzanine, prior to its reopening

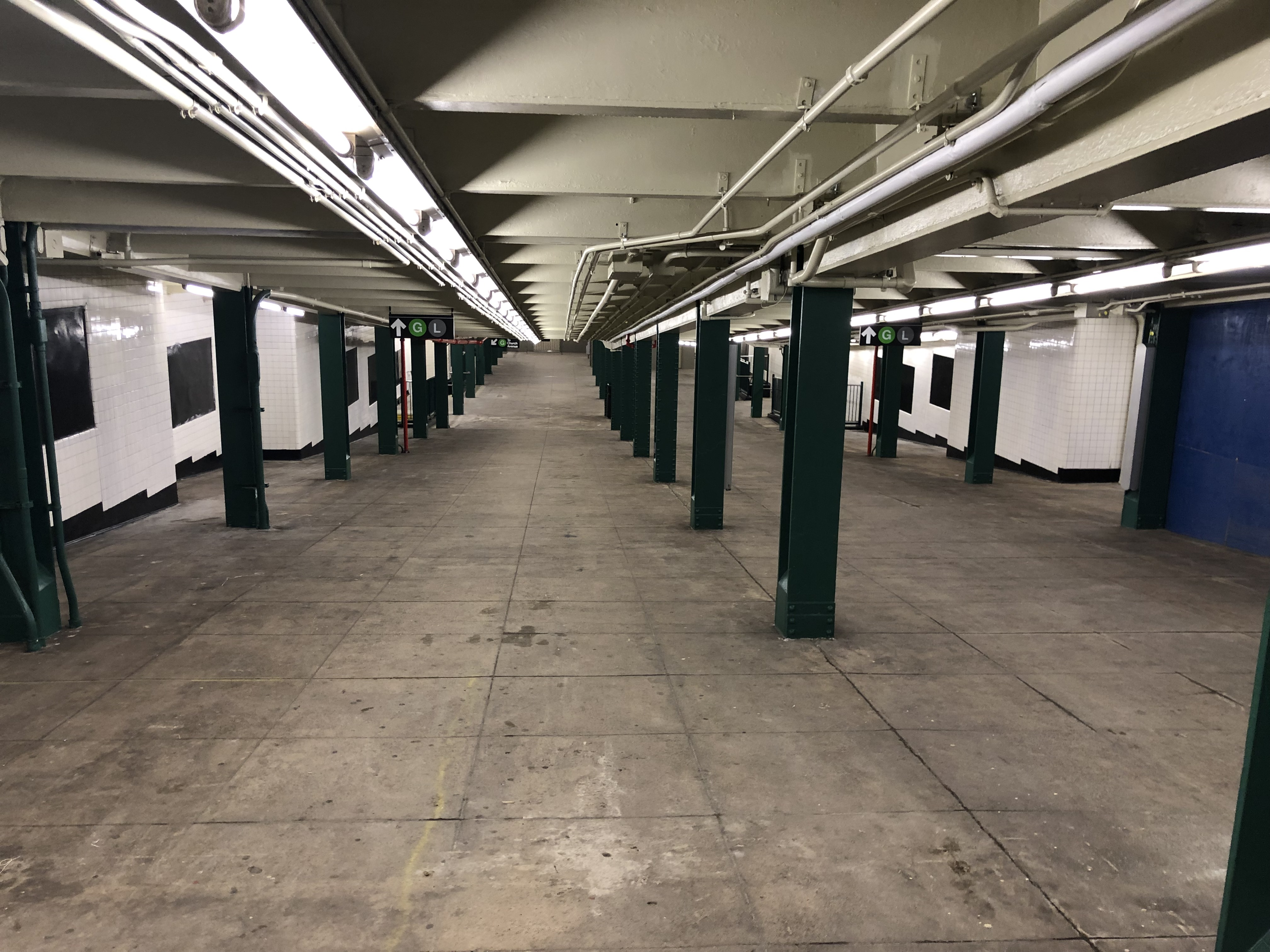
Reopened south mezzanine

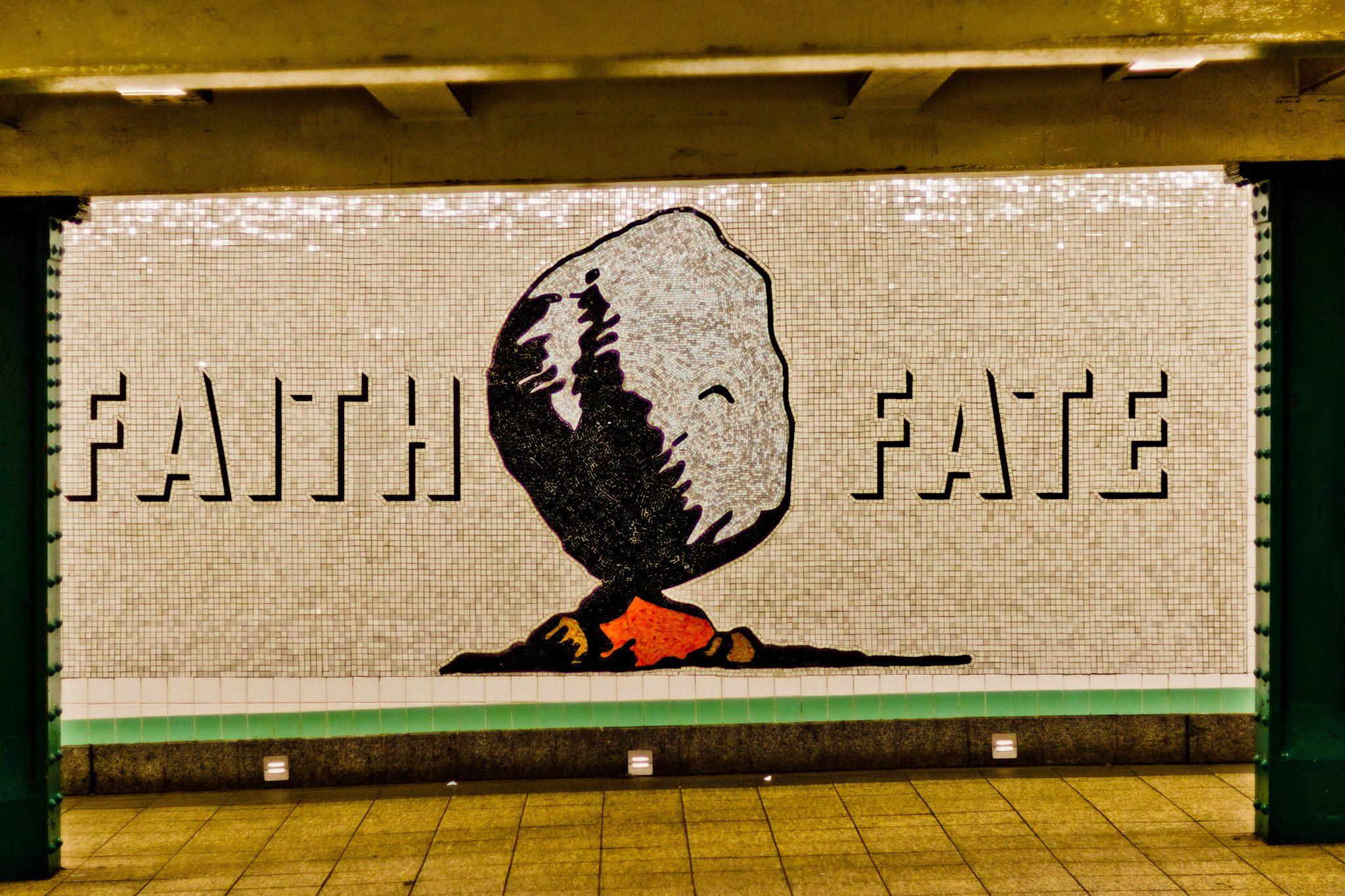
Artwork by Jackie Chang
