= Jennifer Crocker =

American academic

Jennifer Crocker is emerita professor and Ohio Eminent Scholar in social psychology at Ohio State University. She is a former president of the Society for Personality and Social Psychology. Her research focuses on self-esteem, including the contingencies of self-worth and the interpersonal goals that reflect individuals' levels of self-esteem.

== Career ==
Crocker received her B.A. in psychology from Michigan State University and her Ph.D. in psychology and social relations from Harvard University in 1979, with a thesis titled Schemas, Hypothesis-Testing, and Intuitive Assessments of Covariation. She was an assistant professor of psychology at Northwestern University from 1979 to 1985, and a professor at the University of Buffalo from 1985 to 1995. From 1995 to 2010, she served as a research professor at the Institute for Social Research and as the Claude Steele Collegiate Professor of Psychology at the University of Michigan. She joined Ohio State University in June 2010.

== Awards and recognition ==
Crocker is a fellow of the American Psychological Association, the Association for Psychological Science, the Society for Personality and Social Psychology, and the Society for the Psychological Study of Social Issues. She served as president-elect of the Society for Personality and Social Psychology and received the Lifetime Career Award from the International Society for Self and Identity. In 2019, she was elected a fellow of the American Academy of Arts and Sciences.

== Research ==
Crocker studies self-esteem, contingencies of self-worth, and the costs of pursuing self-esteem. She also examines interpersonal goals in the context of relationships.

=== Self-esteem and self-worth ===
Crocker is known for her research on contingencies of self-worth, or contingent self-esteem. She developed the Contingencies of Self-Worth Scale, a 65-item measure that evaluates these contingencies and categorizes them as either externally or internally validated. Externally validated contingencies include appearance, competition, and approval from others, while internally validated contingencies include family support, virtue, and religious faith. Crocker argued that these contingencies shape a person's perception of their own self-worth. Rather than focusing solely on levels of self-esteem, her work emphasizes how the domains in which individuals stake their self-worth influence their behavior, which may have either costs or benefits. She has also studied how contingent self-worth relates to psychological vulnerability and negative behaviors.

Her research examines how individuals pursue self-esteem through success in specific life domains and how this pursuit affects other needs such as learning, relationships, self-regulation, and mental and physical health. Crocker has also explored how self-esteem influences a person's ability to receive criticism, as well as how self-worth shapes goals and motivation. While acknowledging potential benefits of pursuing self-esteem, she emphasizes the costs, suggesting that individuals are often unaware of the negative effects. She has argued that optimal self-esteem may only be possible when the pursuit of self-esteem is absent. She further proposed that goals based on intrinsic values, rather than external validation, foster motivation that supports achievement without harmful costs.

Applications of Crocker's research include studies on depressive symptoms and alcohol use among college students. One study assessed first-year students at the beginning of the academic year and again during the second semester, finding that those who pursued self-esteem based on external contingencies (such as appearance, competition, and approval from others) were more likely to develop depressive symptoms. According to this research, low self-esteem was not the cause of depression but rather a significant symptom associated with it. Another study examined alcohol use and found that while low self-esteem did not predict drinking behavior, contingencies of self-worth tied to internal validation (such as family support, virtue, and religious faith) did predict alcohol use.

More recently, Crocker has studied egosystem and ecosystem goals and their effects on achievement, support, responsiveness, and mental health, including stress, anxiety, and depression. Egosystem goals focus on individual needs and desires, while ecosystem goals emphasize connections with others. Crocker found that ecosystem goals improved intergroup relations by fostering support, understanding, and communication skills, whereas egosystem goals often led to destructive interactions. Her current research examines how interpersonal goals shape physiological processes and influence relationships, including cross-race interactions.

=== Interpersonal goals ===
Crocker has also focused on the relationship between self-image and interpersonal goals, which are goals directed toward attaining, maintaining, or avoiding specific outcomes for a partner or a relationship, such as helping, maintaining closeness, or avoiding rejection. She distinguishes between two outlooks: a narrowly self-interested egosystem perspective and a broader ecosystem perspective.

In the egosystem perspective, individuals prioritize their own needs and desires, often at the expense of others. Crocker refers to these as self-image goals, in which individuals are concerned with the impressions others hold of them. Situations such as job interviews, college applications, or the early stages of relationships may encourage self-image goals, as individuals attempt to present desirable qualities. Crocker's research suggests that self-image goals are costly, leading to competitiveness, fear, confusion, depression, and anxiety.

In contrast, the ecosystem perspective emphasizes both one's own needs and the needs of others. Crocker refers to these as compassionate goals, which involve genuine concern for others' well-being. People with compassionate goals tend to be more responsive in relationships, which strengthens connections and enhances self-esteem. She argues that compassionate goals improve interpersonal responsiveness, which increases others' regard and strengthens one's sense of belonging, self-esteem, and relational value.

== Publications ==
Crocker's most widely cited publication, Social Stigma and Self-Esteem: The Self-Protective Properties of Stigma, was published during her tenure at the University at Buffalo and has been cited over 10,000 times. Her second most cited paper, A Collective Self-Esteem Scale: Self-Evaluation of One's Social Identity, has been cited over 5,000 times. Overall, she has authored 88 publications that have each received more than 100 citations in Google Scholar.
