= Bedford Avenue station =

New York City Subway station in Brooklyn

Bedford Avenue
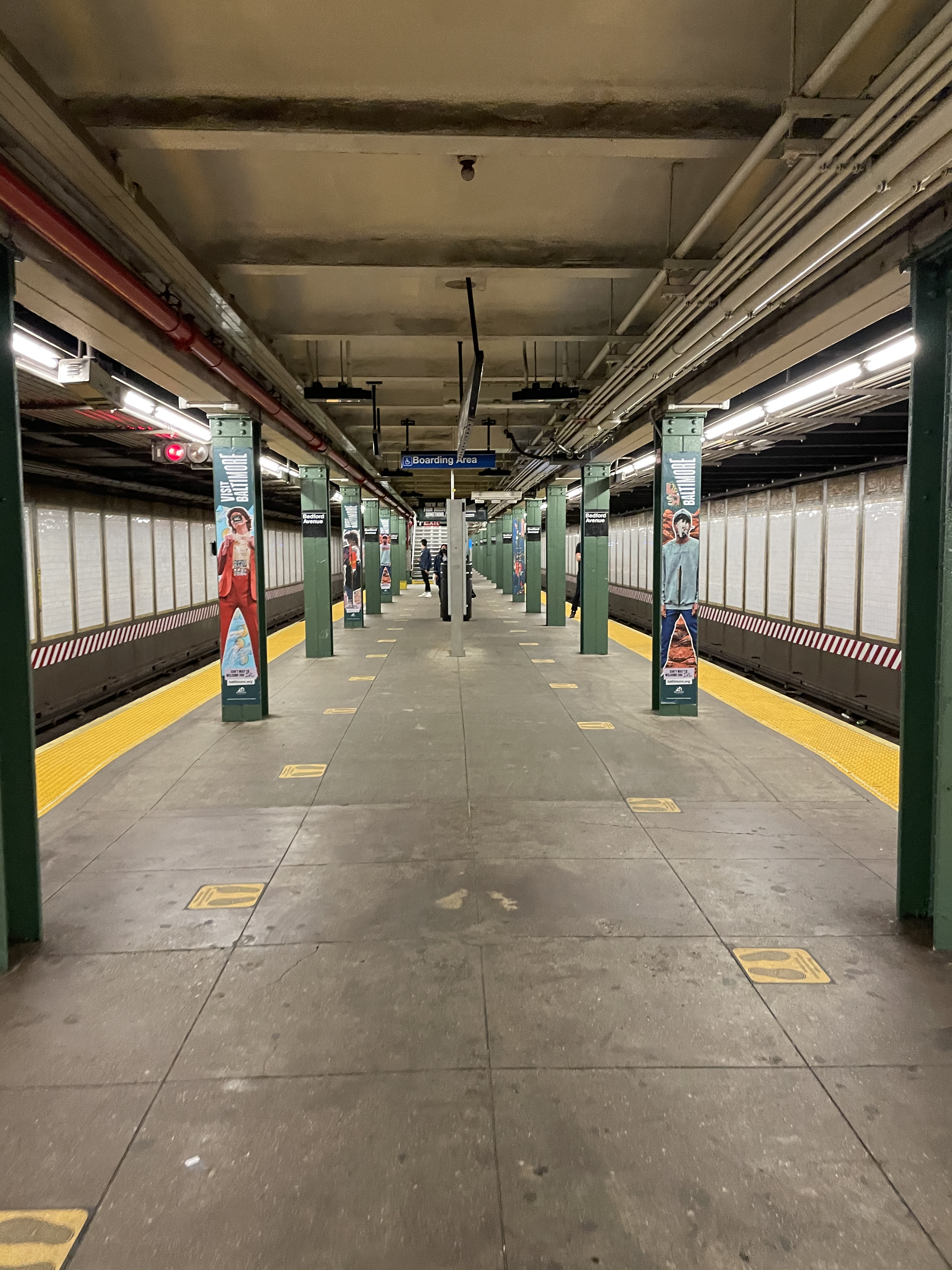
- Station platform

Station statistics
- Address: Bedford Avenue & North Seventh Street; Brooklyn, New York
- Borough: Brooklyn
- Locale: Williamsburg
- Coordinates: 40.71772°N 73.95756°W
- Division: B (BMT)
- Line: BMT Canarsie Line
- Services: L (all times)
- Transit: NYCT Bus: B62, B32 (on Kent/Wythe Avenues); NYC Ferry: East River Route (at North Williamsburg Landing)
- Structure: Underground
- Platforms: 1 island platform
- Tracks: 2

Other information
- Opened: June 30, 1924; 102 years ago
- Accessible: Yes

Traffic
- 2025: 9,815,095 ▲12.5%
- Rank: 23 out of 423
Services
Preceding station	New York City Subway	Following station
First Avenue toward Eighth Avenue	L (New York City Subway service)	Lorimer Street toward Canarsie–Rockaway Parkway
Location
Location within New York City Subway
Location within New York City
Location within New York
Track layout
Street map
Station service legend
Symbol	Description
Stops all times	Stops all times

The Bedford Avenue station is a station on the BMT Canarsie Line of the New York City Subway. Located at the intersection of Bedford Avenue and North Seventh Street in Williamsburg, Brooklyn, it is served by the L train at all times. With an annual total of 9,388,289 passengers for 2015, Bedford Avenue is the busiest subway station in Brooklyn outside of Downtown Brooklyn, as well as the busiest station in Brooklyn served by one subway service.

== History ==
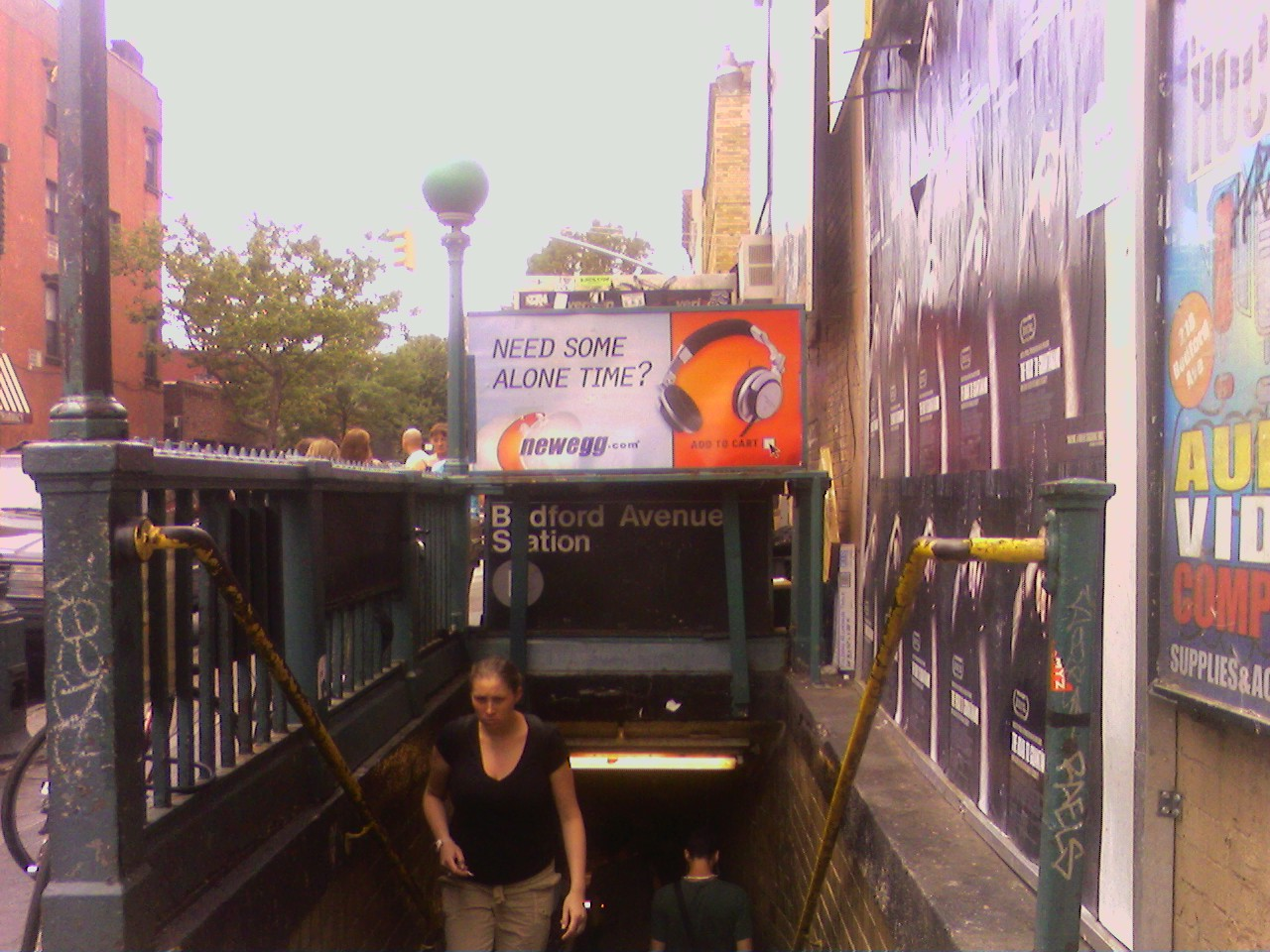
Entrance at the northeastern corner of Bedford Avenue and North Seventh Street

Bedford Avenue opened on June 30, 1924, as part of the initial segment of the underground Canarsie Line that originally stretched from Sixth Avenue station in Manhattan to Montrose Avenue station, built by the Brooklyn–Manhattan Transit Corporation (BMT) under the Dual Contracts.

As part of the wide scope in the rebuilding of the Canarsie Tubes that were damaged during Hurricane Sandy, the Metropolitan Transportation Authority started renovating the station in 2017. At the Bedford Avenue end of the station, two new street-level stairways were built, platform stair capacity was increased, the mezzanine was expanded, turnstiles were added, and new elevators were installed and opened on August 6, 2020. At the Driggs Avenue end, two new street-level stairways were added, the mezzanine area was redesigned with additional turnstiles installed, and a new platform stairway was built. Substantial completion was projected for November 2020, and MTA officials formally dedicated the new elevators and entrances that October.

New York City councilmember Lincoln Restler founded a volunteer group, the Friends of MTA Station Group, in early 2023 to advocate for improvements to the Bedford Avenue station and four other subway stations in Brooklyn. In 2023, a short barrier was installed at the center of the platforms to reduce the probability of passengers being pushed into the tracks. In October 2026, the MTA announced plans to install taller fare gates with glass panels at 20 additional stations, including the Bedford Avenue station, following a successful pilot program at earlier stations.

== Station layout ==
At platform level, Bedford Avenue utilizes a simple island platform setup with two tracks. Fixed platform barriers, which are intended to prevent commuters falling to the tracks, are positioned near the platform edges.

The Bedford Avenue station's walls have a brown-and-green mosaic pattern with geometric shapes and embellished "B" ornamentation.

There are two mezzanines above the platform: one at Bedford Avenue on the west and one at Driggs Avenue on the east. Two stairs and an elevator rise from the west end of the platform to the Bedford Avenue mezzanine, while a stair from the east end of the platform rises to the Driggs Avenue mezzanine.

=== Exits ===
There are two sets of entrance and exit points. The western set comprises four street stairs: two stairs each to the southeastern and northeastern corners of Bedford Avenue and North 7th Street. It also comprises a 24-hour booth and an elevator to the northeastern corner of the intersection. The eastern exits are two stairs each to the southeastern and northeastern corners of North 7th Street and Driggs Avenue.

Some of these staircases are original to the station, while others were built as part of the 2019 expansion. The entrances built as part of the expansion are similar to those at Enhanced Station Initiative stations in other parts of the subway system, with next-train countdown clocks and neighborhood wayfinding maps at the exterior of the entrance. The new entrances contain a mural by Marcel Dzama entitled No Less Than Everything Comes Together, which depicts a sun and moon rising over fanciful figures.

== Ridership ==
Bedford Avenue has experienced a surge in ridership along with the recent gentrification of Williamsburg. In the 1970s, the station had a fairly low annual ridership of 1.2 million, amounting to an average of 3,000 entries during weekdays. In 2000, there were 3.783 million boardings recorded at the station, but after the neighborhood was re-zoned in 2005, the MTA noted even higher ridership. By 2007, ridership had increased over 50%, to 5.776 million annual passengers. In 2008, Bedford Avenue was used by more than 6 million people, making it the 53rd most-used subway station in New York City and one of the busiest in Brooklyn. In 2025, 9,815,095 riders used this station.

Between 1998 and 2011, passenger numbers on the L increased three times as much as ridership on the subway system as a whole. As a result, by 2011, many Manhattan-bound L trains were running at their full capacity of 1,160 riders per train by the time they reached the Bedford Avenue station. In 2010, Bedford Avenue surpassed seven million entries for the first time in its history, receiving press for its particularly high weekend passenger volume. Crowding has become such an issue that politicians have called upon the MTA to "create a schedule that is more reflective of ridership patterns."
