= Larimer (surname) =

Larimer is an occupational surname, denoting individuals who made stirrup irons, spurs and other metal articles that people used with horses. Notable people with the surname include:

- David G. Larimer (born 1944), United States federal judge
- Jeff Larimer, (born 1981), canoeist
- Marc Larimer (1890-1919), fencer
- Mary E. Larimer, psychologist
- Smith Larimer (1828-1881), American Civil War Medal of Honor recipient
- William Larimer, Jr. (1809–1875), Kansas state senator and founder of the city of Denver
