= Lorimier =

Lorimier (Anglicized as Loramie) is a French surname (from Old French lorimer, a maker of horses' bits). It may refer to:

== Persons ==
- Claude-Nicolas-Guillaume de Lorimier (1744–1825), businessman, official and political figure in Lower Canada
- François-Marie-Thomas Chevalier de Lorimier (1803–1839), notary who fought for the independence of Lower Canada
- Pierre-Louis de Lorimier (1748–1812), aka Peter Loramie, French-Canadian fur trader and frontiersman in Ohio Country

== Places ==
- Old Lorimier Cemetery: Cape Girardeau, Missouri; established in 1808 by Pierre-Louis de Lorimier
- Loramie Creek, Ohio
  - Loramie Creek AVA, Ohio
- Loramie Township, Shelby County, Ohio
- Lake Loramie State Park, Ohio
- Fort Loramie, Ohio, established as a fur trading post by Pierre-Louis de Lorimier
  - Fort Loramie High School, Fort Loramie, Ohio

== See also ==
- Lorimer (disambiguation)
- Laramie (disambiguation)
