= Larimer, Pennsylvania =

Unincorporated community in Pennsylvania, US

- Unincorporated community
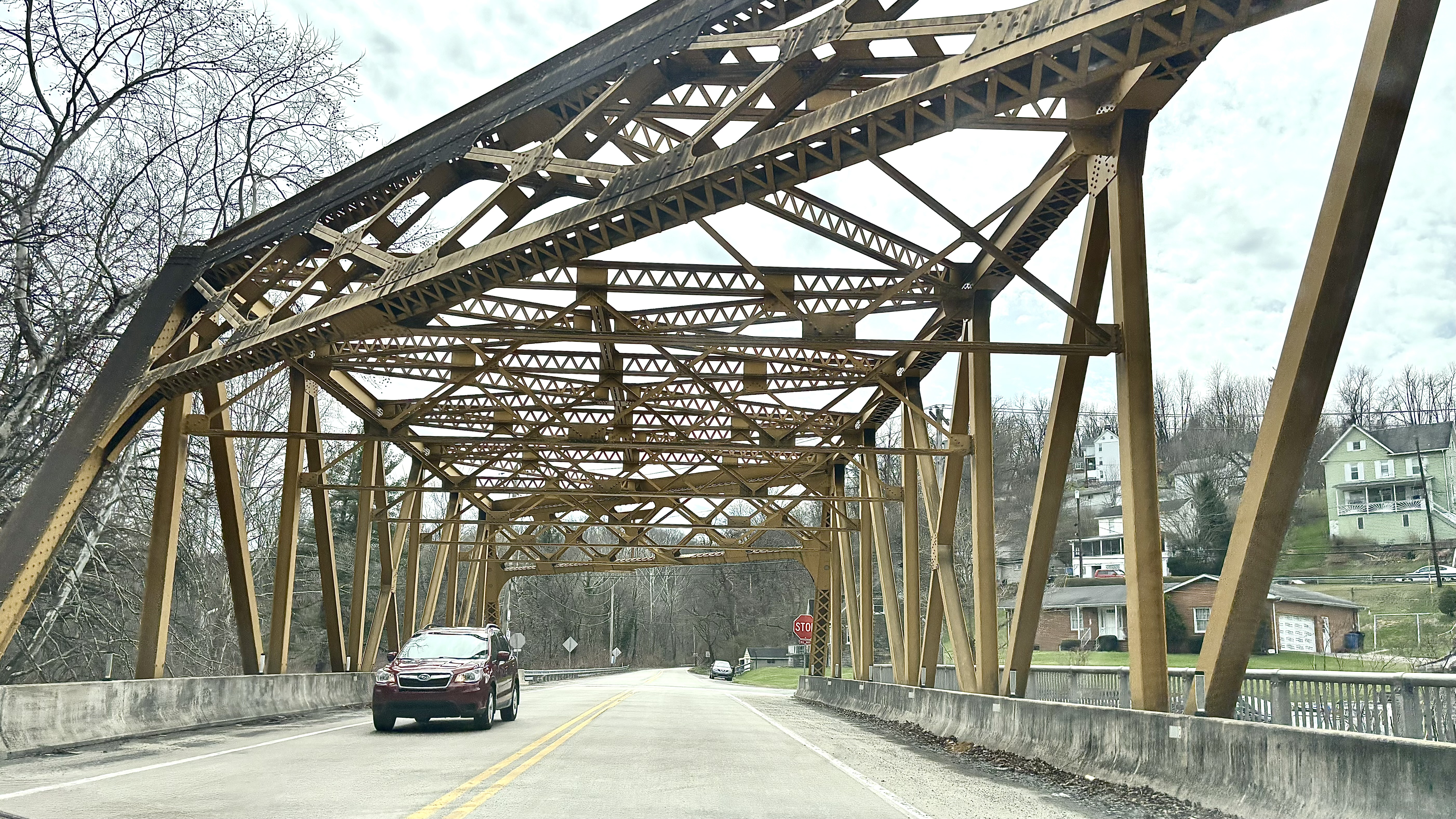
- Bridge over Brush Creek in Larimer

- Location within Pennsylvania
- Coordinates: 40°20′43″N 79°43′35″W
- Country: United States
- State: Pennsylvania
- County: Westmoreland
- Elevation: 869 ft (265 m)
- Time zone: UTC-5 (Eastern (EST))
  - Summer (DST): UTC-4 (EDT)
- ZIP code: 15647
- Area codes: 724, 878
- GNIS feature ID: 1178892

Larimer is an unincorporated community in Westmoreland County, Pennsylvania, United States. The community is located along Pennsylvania Route 993, 2 miles (3.2 km) northwest of Irwin. Larimer has a post office, with ZIP code 15647, which opened on August 16, 1852.
