= 14th Street Tunnel shutdown =

Reconstruction of a New York City Subway tunnel

Coordinates: 40.724°N 73.967°W

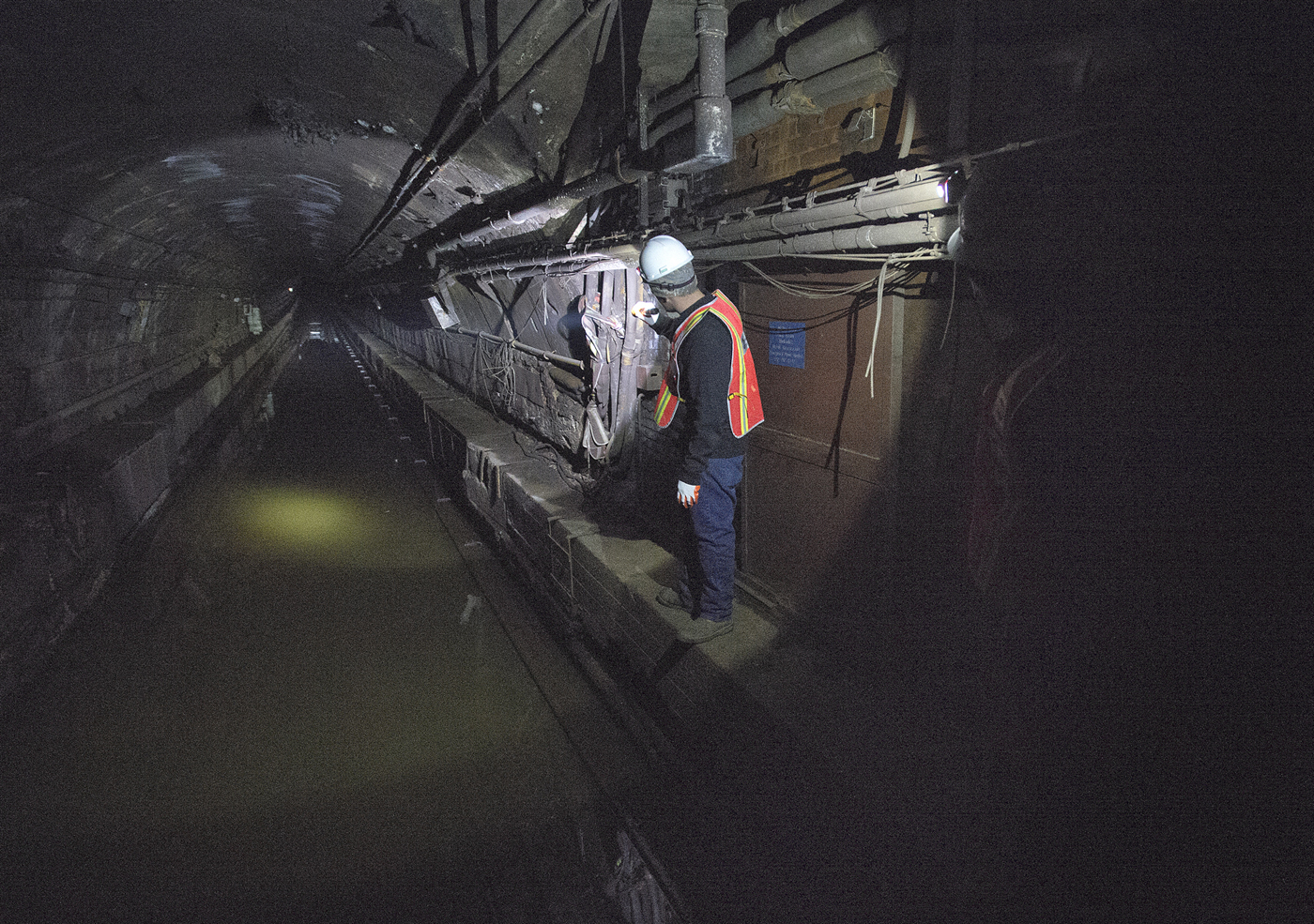
Tunnels flooded by Hurricane Sandy

The 14th Street Tunnel shutdown (also referred to as the L Project, the L train shutdown, or the Canarsie Tunnel reconstruction) was the partial closure and reconstruction of the New York City Subway's 14th Street Tunnel that took place from April 2019 to April 2020. The tunnel carries the BMT Canarsie Line (serving the L train) under the East River in New York City, connecting the boroughs of Brooklyn and Manhattan, and is used by an average of 225,000 passengers per weekday. A key segment of the 14th Street Tunnel, between the Bedford Avenue station in Brooklyn and the First Avenue station in Manhattan, would be partially closed for 15 to 20 months to allow for necessary and extensive repairs to the underwater tubes after it was flooded and severely damaged during Hurricane Sandy in 2012.

Two options were proposed in 2016: a three-year construction period where one tube at a time would be closed or an 18-month closure where both tubes would be worked on simultaneously. The Metropolitan Transportation Authority ultimately chose the 18-month closure option because it would be less disruptive to passenger service. The shutdown period was later reduced to 15 months to reduce service disruption. To accommodate displaced passengers, new or expanded bus, subway, and ferry service was to be added, and a 14th Street busway would have been implemented. The shutdown plan was criticized by riders who use the L train and people living along or near 14th Street in Manhattan, as it would have had adverse effects on other subway routes and on vehicular traffic. In January 2019, it was announced that the shutdown would not be a full-time closure, but a night and weekend closure. Ultimately, the line was not closed; night and weekend service was merely reduced.

== Background ==
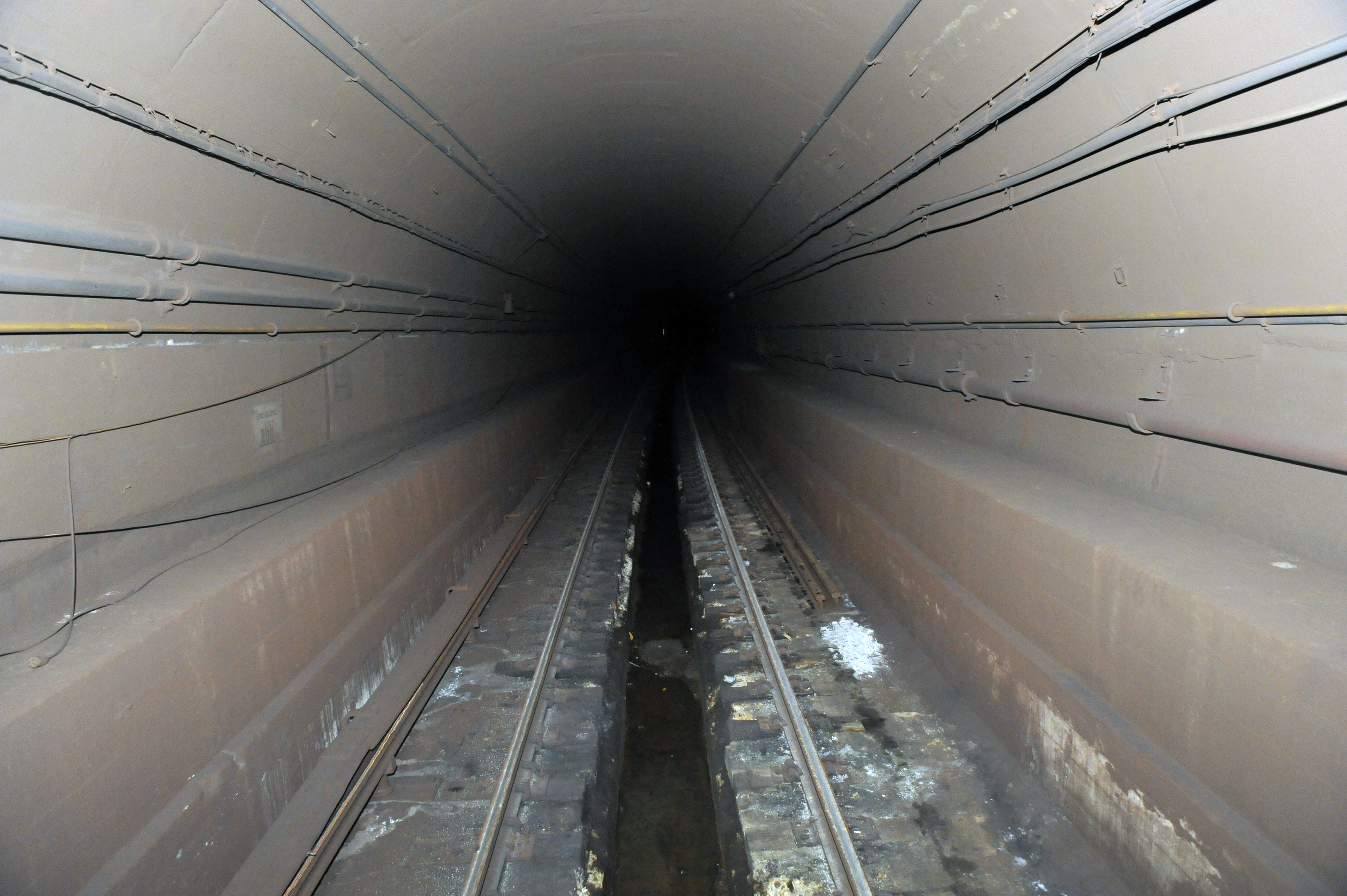
Damaged tunnels after draining

In October 2012, Hurricane Sandy caused severe damage to New York City, and many subway tunnels were inundated with floodwater. The storm flooded nine of the system's 14 underwater tunnels, many subway lines and yards, and completely destroyed a portion of the Rockaway Line (A train) in Queens, as well as much of the South Ferry terminal at Manhattan's southern tip.

The subway opened with limited service two days after the storm and was running at 80 percent capacity within five days; however, some infrastructure needed repairs, which were staggered over several years starting in 2013. A year after the storm, a spokesman for the Metropolitan Transportation Authority (MTA), which operates the New York City Subway, said that Hurricane Sandy "was unprecedented in terms of the amount of damage that we were seeing throughout the system." Reconstruction required many weekend closures on several lines and long-term closures on the Greenpoint Tunnel (G train), Montague Street Tunnel (R train), Rockaway Line, and the South Ferry station. A long-term closure was planned for the 14th Street Tunnel because it was significantly damaged by the storm surge. Moreover, the 14th Street Tunnel dates from 1924; thus its equipment was already 88 years old when Hurricane Sandy occurred.

== Planning ==
=== Closure options ===
In January 2016, the Canarsie Line between the Bedford Avenue station in Brooklyn and the Eighth Avenue station in Manhattan was proposed for either of two shutdown options. One option involved shuttering the entire segment for eighteen months. The other option would allow the MTA to operate two segments of track for three years: a single-track segment between Bedford and Eighth Avenues with a capacity of 5 trains per hour per direction, and regular service between Lorimer Street and Rockaway Parkway. For both options, the Third Avenue station would be closed and new exits and elevators at the First Avenue and Bedford Avenue stations would be added. The renovations would cost between $800 million and $1 billion; as of July 2018, the project budget includes $926 million. During the shutdown, workers would replace damaged communications, power and signal wires, third rails and tracks, duct banks, pump rooms, circuit breaker houses, tunnel lighting, concrete lining, and fire protection systems. Three new electric substations would provide more power to run more trains during rush hours.

The closure would affect the 225,000 subway riders per weekday who travel on the 14th Street Tunnel between Brooklyn and Manhattan. This accounts for about 75% of the 300,000 riders per day who use the L train. Community meetings were held to determine which of the two options would be better. In an internal assessment, the MTA concluded that four out of five L train riders would be less impacted by the full-closure option compared to the partial-closure option. Additionally, the single-track option would result in severe overcrowding at First and Bedford Avenues. A subsequent poll conducted by transit-advocacy group Riders Alliance revealed that 77 percent of L train riders preferred the 18-month closure option. In July 2016, it was announced that the MTA had chosen the 18-month full closure option. Riders reacted with both disappointment over the closure, and relief that the service disruption would be shorter. The New York Post described the closure with the headline, "2019 is the year Williamsburg dies."

Map of service alternatives during the 14th Street Tunnel shutdown.: Colored thick lines represent alternate routes to the L train across the East River and in Manhattan.; Solid black lines represent route segments indirectly affected by the implementation of alternate route patterns.; Thin gray lines represent route segments unaffected by the shutdown.; The segment of the L train that would have remained open is represented by a thick, solid gray line.; The segment of the L train that would have been temporarily closed is represented by a thick, dashed gray line.

The MTA named Judlau Contracting and TC Electric as the project's contractors on April 3, 2017, at which time the duration of the shutdown was shortened to 15 months. It offered the contractors a $188,000-a-day bonus for completing work up to 60 days early. as well as a $15 million bonus for completing the project on time; the MTA also stipulated that the companies would need to pay a fine of $410,000 for each day that work is delayed past the 15-month deadline. The joint venture is also responsible for renovating the First Avenue and Bedford Avenue stations during the shutdown, as well as adding platform screen doors to the Third Avenue station. According to a July 2018 report, construction was supposed to be "substantially completed" by November 2020.

=== Initial mitigation plans ===
The MTA indicated that during the shutdown, the L route would only have a frequency of ten trains per hour between Bedford Avenue and Rockaway Parkway, because of severely constrained terminal capacity at Bedford Avenue. In mid-2016, the MTA devised preliminary mitigation plans, which proposed additional shuttle bus, ferry, and subway service. A ferry route between Williamsburg and the East Village of Manhattan would be instituted; the M14A and M14D buses might be converted to Select Bus Service; and dedicated bus lanes would be placed on crosstown corridors in Manhattan. The MTA would institute two out-of-system subway transfers, free if paid via MetroCard: one between Broadway (G train) and Lorimer Street (J and M trains), and one between Livonia Avenue (L train) and Junius Street (34 train). In addition, the plan included extending G trains from four cars to eight cars, as well as running the M train to Midtown Manhattan daily, instead of on weekdays only. Preliminary documents also proposed that the four toll-free East River bridges between Manhattan and Long Island (the Queensboro, Williamsburg, Manhattan, and Brooklyn Bridges) might gain a high-occupancy vehicle (HOV) restriction of at least three passengers per vehicle during rush hours.

In December 2017, the MTA and the New York City Department of Transportation (NYCDOT) released a more concrete mitigation plan, based on projections that 80% of riders would transfer to other subway services to get to Manhattan, while 15% would use buses. An HOV restriction on the Williamsburg Bridge during rush hours would allow it to accommodate three Select Bus Service (SBS) routes between Brooklyn and Manhattan. Route L1 would stretch from Union Square, Manhattan, to the Grand Street station in Brooklyn; L2 would connect SoHo, Manhattan to the Grand Street station; and L3 would go from SoHo to Bedford Avenue. In addition, 14th Street between Third and Ninth Avenues would be converted into a bus-only corridor during rush hours to accommodate an SBS route across 14th Street, connecting to a ferry route at Stuyvesant Cove Park near 23rd Street. The mitigation plan also entailed improvements to six subway stations, new entrances at two stations, enlarged crosswalks near these subway stations, longer G and C trains, three free out-of-system transfers, (Note: The three free out-of-system transfers would be the aforementioned Broadway/Lorimer Street and Livonia Avenue/Junius Street transfers, as well as a third transfer between 21st Street (G train) and Hunters Point Avenue (7 and <7> trains) in Queens. A fourth out-of-system transfer was later added between Broadway and Hewes Street on the J, M, and Z trains.) increased service on the G, J/Z and M trains, and a weekend extension of the M train to 96th Street and Second Avenue. Finally, the plan included an expansion of New York City's privately operated bike share system, Citi Bike, as well as upgrades to bike lanes on Brooklyn's Grand Street and a pair of crosstown bike lanes on 12th and 13th Streets. Some subway entrances on each of the affected routes would also be reopened.

On December 14, 2017, members of the New York City Council held a hearing in which they asked the MTA head and NYCDOT Commissioner over the shutdown. The central question was whether the MTA could complete repairs by the July 2020 deadline. It was projected that during the shutdown, the 14th Street buses would become the most-used bus corridor in the city, and that 70 buses in each direction would travel across the Williamsburg Bridge every hour. As a result, Lower Manhattan politicians worried that the narrow streets in the area would not be able to accommodate the high-capacity buses.

=== Modified mitigation plans ===
Proposed peak-direction shutdown headways in trains per hour (tph)
Line	Routes	Headway before shutdown (tph)		Headway after shutdown (tph)	
BMT Canarsie Line (Bedford Ave to Rockaway Pkwy)	"L" train	20		10	
BMT Jamaica Line (Marcy Ave to Myrtle Ave)	"j" train "z" train	12	21	10	24
BMT Jamaica Line (Marcy Ave to Myrtle Ave)	"m" train	9	21	14	24
IND Crosstown Line (Court Square to Bedford–Nostrand)	"g" train	9		15	
IND Crosstown Line (Bedford–Nostrand to Bergen St)	"g" train	9		12	
IND Culver Line (Bergen St to Church Ave)	"f" train	14	23	14	26
IND Culver Line (Bergen St to Church Ave)	"g" train	9	23	12	26
IND Queens Boulevard Line local tracks	"m" train	9	19	12 (Note: The change in Queens Boulevard local headways is only effective during rush hours in the peak direction from Queens (southbound in the morning, northbound in the afternoon). Rush-hour R train frequencies in the peak direction from Brooklyn (northbound in the morning, southbound in the afternoon) are unaffected.)	20
IND Queens Boulevard Line local tracks	"r" train	10	19	8	20
IND Sixth Avenue Line local tracks	"f" train	14	23	14	28
IND Sixth Avenue Line local tracks	"m" train	9	23	14	28

In June 2018, as part of a lawsuit settlement, the MTA agreed to install elevators at the Sixth Avenue station and conduct an environmental impact study on the Canarsie Tunnel rehabilitation's effects. The city also considered turning 14th Street into an exclusive busway 17 hours a day during all days of the week, and changed its initial plans for a two-way bike lane on 13th Street to two separate bike lanes on 12th and 13th Streets. When the 14th Street busway was enforced during the shutdown, the only vehicles that would be able to use the busway would be buses, trucks making deliveries on 14th Street, emergency and Access-A-Ride vehicles, and local traffic traveling for no more than one block. According to Winnie Hu, a transit specialist at The New York Times, the plan was inspired by Toronto's successful King Street Pilot Project, where restriction on ordinary vehicles on a section of previously clogged King Street sped up transit times for riders on the 504 King streetcar route, the Toronto Transit Commission's busiest surface route. The Toronto experiment allowed ordinary vehicles to continue to briefly use King Street, provided they turned off at the next stoplight.

Separately, the MTA revised contingency plans so that there would be four SBS routes. They included the already-planned L1 Union Square–Grand Street, L2 SoHo–Grand Street, and L3 SoHo–Bedford Avenue routes, as well as a new route L4 between Union Square and Bedford Avenue. The four routes combined would carry 17% of displaced L train riders, while subways would carry another 70% and other transport methods would make up the remaining 13%. Citi Bike announced plans to add 1,250 bikes and 2,500 bike-share docks during the shutdown. A private company also announced their intention to create a luxury "New L" shuttle van service during the shutdown.

In July 2018, the MTA and NYCDOT announced that the M14 Select Bus Service route would be implemented by January 6, 2019, three months before the tunnel was set to shut down. It would initially run with five stops in each direction between First Avenue/14th Street and 10th Avenue/14th Street. Local service on the M14A and M14D would be retained with minor modifications. One or two weeks before the tunnel closes, the M14 SBS would be extended to Stuyvesant Cove. The M14A/D local and the M14 SBS would be able to serve a combined 84,000 passengers every hour, with a bus every two minutes during rush hours. Sidewalks on nearby streets would be widened, and temporary pedestrian plazas would be designated, to accommodate the new Select Bus Service routes.

The MTA also released additional details about headways on affected transit routes. The peak frequency of the G train would be increased from eight trains per hour (TPH) to 15 TPH between Court Square and Bedford–Nostrand Avenues, and from 8 to 12 TPH south of Bedford–Nostrand Avenues. Some G trains would have been extended to 18th Avenue during rush hours due to capacity constraints at Church Avenue. The M train's peak frequency would be increased from 9 to 14 TPH between Myrtle Avenue and Manhattan, while the frequency of the J/Z and R trains would be decreased to accommodate the additional M service running on the same tracks. Several other subway routes between Manhattan and Brooklyn or Queens would have additional off-peak service. For bus route headways, the combined peak frequency of the M14 variants would be increased from 25 buses per hour to 35, and the B39 bus across the Williamsburg Bridge would be temporarily suspended because it would completely duplicate the temporary L3 route. The L1 through L4 buses would provide a combined 80 buses per hour during peak hours. Headways on local bus routes in Brooklyn that would connect with the L shuttle buses, such as the B6, B32, B48, B57, B60, B62 and B103, would also be increased. The ferry service between Stuyvesant Cove and North 7th Street would run at a frequency of 8 trips per hour in each direction during rush hours. 7 trains would see increased service during rush hours, with fourteen additional 7 train round trips.

In September 2018, the MTA indicated that the New York City Economic Development Corporation (NYCEDC) had been selected to manage the temporary L shuttle ferry's operation, since the corporation had already operated ferry routes in New York City under the NYC Ferry label. In turn, the NYCEDC was to contract the temporary shuttle ferry's operation out to NY Waterway as per the results of a request for proposals. The ferry was to operate for 15 months during the shutdown. The shuttle was to operate every 10 to 15 minutes from 6 a.m. until midnight on weekday nights, and until 2 a.m. on weekend nights. During rush hours, ferries would run every 7½ minutes. Free transfers were to be available between the ferry and two Select Bus Service routes, one on either side of the East River. The same month, it was announced that an additional bus route, L5, was to operate rush hours between Canarsie Pier and Crown Heights, connecting Canarsie residents to the Crown Heights–Utica Avenue station on the 2, 3, 4, and 5 trains. Unlike the other temporary routes, the L5 was not going to be a SBS route, and was only supposed to operate during rush hours every 20 minutes, making limited stops between Canarsie Pier and Utica Avenue.

That October, the MTA clarified its proposed temporary changes to subway service. During weekdays, there would be major increases in the number of G and M train trips; smaller increases in E, F, and J/Z train trips; minor modifications to A and R train trips; and a sharp decrease in L train trips. All of these routes except for the A and R routes would also see modified service frequencies on weekends, and the M would run to 96th Street/Second Avenue during both late nights and weekends. It was also announced that the shutdown would start on April 27, 2019. In the months before the long-term closure began, service would be suspended on some weekends and nights.

==== Temporary L shutdown bus routes ====
The following routes were planned to operate during the shutdown:

Route	Terminals			Streets traveled		Notes and history
Route	Manhattan or western terminal	↔	Brooklyn or eastern terminal	Manhattan	Brooklyn	Notes and history
L1	Select Bus Service					
L1	Gramercy; 1st Avenue and 15th Street	↔	East Williamsburg; Grand Street and Bushwick Avenue at Grand Street ( L train)	1st Avenue (westbound), 2nd Avenue, Houston Street (eastbound), Allen Street, Delancey Street	Borinquen Place, Grand Street	Was to operate during rush hours only.
L2	Select Bus Service					
L2	SoHo; Lafayette and Houston Streets at Broadway–Lafayette Street/Bleecker Street ( 4 6 <6> B D F <F> M trains)	↔	East Williamsburg; Grand Street and Bushwick Avenue at Grand Street ( L train)	Kenmare Street, Lafayette Street (westbound), Houston Street, Bowery (eastbound), Delancey Street	Borinquen Place, Grand Street	Was to operate at all times.
L3	Select Bus Service					
L3	SoHo; Lafayette and Houston Streets at Broadway–Lafayette Street/Bleecker Street ( 4 6 <6> B D F <F> M trains)	↔	Williamsburg; North 5th Street and Bedford Avenue at Bedford Avenue ( L train)	Kenmare Street, Lafayette Street (westbound), Houston Street, Bowery (eastbound), Delancey Street	North 5th Street, Roebling Street (westbound), Broadway, Berry Street (eastbound)	Was to operate at all times except late nights.
L4	Select Bus Service					
L4	Gramercy; 1st Avenue and 15th Street	↔	Williamsburg; North 5th Street and Bedford Avenue at Bedford Avenue ( L train)	1st Avenue (westbound), 2nd Avenue, Houston Street (eastbound), Allen Street, Delancey Street	North 5th Street, Roebling Street (westbound), Broadway, Berry Street (eastbound)	Was to operate at all times except late nights.
L5	Limited-stop service					
L5	Crown Heights; Utica Avenue and Eastern Parkway at Utica Avenue ( 2 3 4 5 trains)	↔	Canarsie; Rockaway Parkway and Belt Parkway	None	Rockaway Parkway, Remsen Avenue	Was to operate during rush hours only.
L14	Select Bus Service					
L14	Meatpacking District; 14th Street and 10th Avenue	↔	Williamsburg; North 5th Street and Bedford Avenue at Bedford Avenue ( L train)	14th Street, Avenue A, Essex Street, Delancey Street	North 5th Street, Roebling Street (westbound), Broadway, Berry Street (eastbound)	Was to operate late nights only, when the M14 SBS is not operating.

==== Criticism of mitigation plans ====
In April and May 2018, writers for the now-defunct Village Voice had published a comprehensive analysis of the possible effects of the L train shutdown on other subway routes. The J/Z and M train would be affected the most because these would be the only direct subway routes from Williamsburg and Bushwick to Manhattan during the shutdown. The G train would also carry displaced L train riders from Williamsburg and Bushwick to other subway routes in Downtown Brooklyn and Queens, resulting in capacity decreases on F and <F> train riders on the IND Culver Line in southern Brooklyn. The A and C trains would carry L train riders transferring at Broadway Junction, which was not originally designed as a transfer station, as well as G riders transferring at Hoyt–Schermerhorn Streets, some of whom had already transferred from the L. G train riders could also transfer to the E, F, and <F> trains or the 7 and <7> trains at Court Square–23rd Street. As the 7 and <7> trains would reach capacity during rush hours, some riders already on that route would probably transfer to the N and W trains at Queensboro Plaza, one stop east of Court Square. The E, F, and <F> trains would also reach capacity during rush hours, bringing cascading effects to E, F, <F>, M, and R riders further east in Queens. One Voice writer concluded that "If you do not take the J, M, Z, A, C, 7, F, G, E, M, or R lines, then I have some good news: You're probably, probably not screwed during the L train shutdown. Except — you had to know there would be exceptions — for those of you who take the 3 and the N/W." In total, fourteen services would be affected by the shutdown.

In October 2018, the mitigation plans were described by a Curbed NY writer as inadequate, because of the lack of nearby subway routes that go directly to Manhattan; the lack of passenger capacity at key transfer stations; and the fact that nearly a quarter-million riders use the L train every day. The Curbed writer stated that one service disruption on the J, M, and Z trains would have a ripple effect on displaced Canarsie Tube riders.

=== Change in shutdown plans ===
In December 2018, four months before the planned closure of the 14th Street Tunnel, New York governor Andrew Cuomo announced that he would personally visit the tunnel with several transportation experts that month. Cuomo said that he wanted to determine if the closure time could be reduced even further. By this point, the mitigation plans were being finalized. Work on painting road markings, including a busway on 14th Street, was underway.

On January 3, 2019, following the tunnel tour, Cuomo announced at a news conference that the tunnels would not completely shut down, contingent on the MTA board approving an alternate plan. Instead, work would occur on weekends and nights, and construction could be finished in 15 to 20 months. This would be accomplished by hanging wires onto the sides of the tunnels and repairing the benchwalls alongside each track, similar to what was used in the subway systems of Hong Kong, London, and Riyadh, rather than completely replacing the benchwalls as was originally planned. A similar plan had been considered in 2014, but rejected due to the extent of silica exposure that this option entailed, and another report in 2015 had concluded that a weekend-only shutdown might be unsafe. The announcement occurred after Cuomo consulted with experts from Columbia University and Cornell University, and he reportedly also contacted Tesla, Inc. The MTA board was not given advance notice of the announcement, and Cuomo only told the MTA to convene an emergency meeting after the announcement had been made.

The announcement was criticized by transit advocates who said that a full closure would allow construction to be completed at once, similar to in the Montague Street Tunnel, as opposed to a piecemeal closure, which could take years. Cuomo was also criticized for taking so long to come up with the partial shutdown plan. Many Brooklyn residents and business owners along the route had already moved as a result of the proposed closure, and some North Brooklyn landlords reportedly regretted having signed leases for lower prices. However, the announcement was praised by the shutdown's opponents, which had previously filed a lawsuit over the proposed shutdown. Landlords and brokers also viewed the change in plans favorably.

Following the conference, New York City Transit Authority head Andy Byford stated that the Williamsburg Bridge's HOV lanes and the shuttle ferry were no longer needed. The contract with Judlau would also have to be renegotiated and put before the board for a vote, as the contractor had already started the process of procuring materials for a full shutdown. However, the MTA's website indicated that many of the mitigation measures, including station improvements, accessibility renovations, and L train frequency enhancements, would continue. After the conference, Cuomo also stated that he wanted to "blow up" the MTA and restructure its entire operating hierarchy because the agency was inefficient. A special board meeting about the shutdown was held on January 15, 2019. At the board meeting, the modified plan was approved, despite objections from some members.

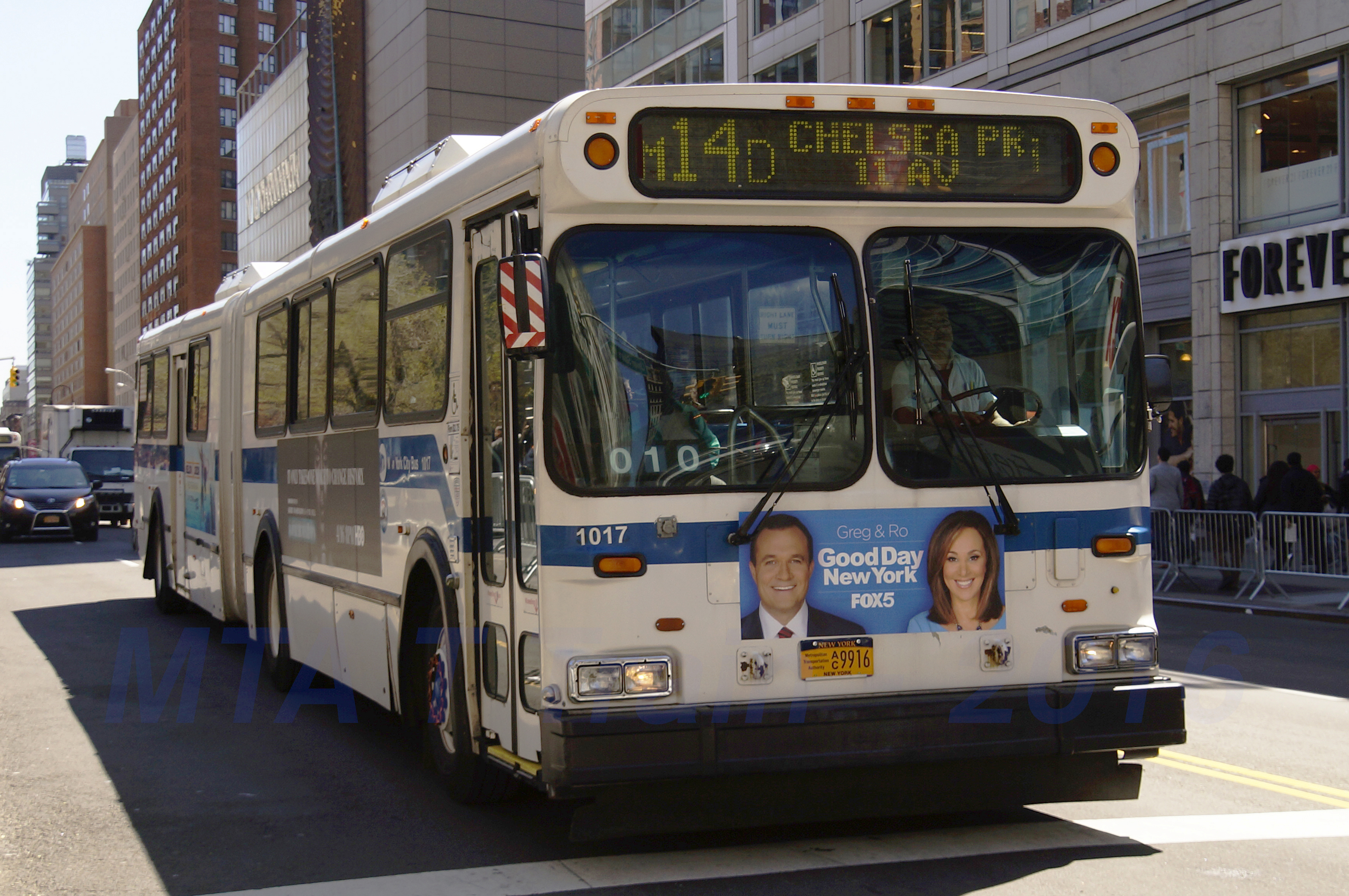
Initial contingency plans for the shutdown called for the M14 bus to be converted to Select Bus Service

The following month, the MTA decided that several of the previously announced mitigation measures would not be needed. For instance, the Williamsburg Bridge HOV restrictions and the 14th Street busway would not be implemented. In addition, the G would not receive full-length trains, though it would still see an increase in train frequencies during nights and weekends. However, the station improvements would still proceed, and the partial shutdown would begin on April 27, 2019, as previously confirmed. Due to crowding concerns the MTA considered making the First and Third Avenues stations exit-only during weekends. Under the new plan, the free out-of-system transfers would be kept, except for between 21st Street and Hunters Point Avenue in Queens, and would only be instituted during weekends and late nights. Instead of running five shuttle bus routes in Manhattan and Brooklyn at all times, two "Williamsburg Link" shuttle buses, B92 clockwise and B91 counterclockwise, would run during weekends and late nights only. M14A bus service in Manhattan would be increased during weekends.

In the months prior to the proposed closure, the MTA suspended L service between Broadway Junction and Eighth Avenue during the weekends in preparation for the partial shutdown. Instead, it operated three shuttle bus routes and expanded M train and M14A bus service. In April 2019, it was announced that the 14th Street busway would be added back to the mitigation plan, though the busway would take effect in June. The busway would have the same vehicle restrictions as originally planned. The M14A/M14D routes would be converted to Select Bus Service, a modification of the temporary Select Bus Service route that had been planned for the full shutdown. The M14A/D were converted to Select Bus Service routes on July 1, 2019. However, the busway did not take effect until October 3, 2019.

== Construction ==
The first construction work related to the 14th Street Tunnel shutdown began in 2017. Workers excavated shafts at the First Avenue and Bedford Avenue stations so equipment could be lowered into the tubes. After the repairs are completed, these shafts are to be converted into additional entrances for those stations. The construction of shafts at the First Avenue station began in July 2017 at the intersection of 14th Street and Avenue A. Shafts were also built at Driggs Avenue and North 5th Street in Brooklyn, at the Bedford Avenue station. The Bedford Avenue station's mezzanine would be expanded to make way for the new entrances. As of July 2018, the projects at First Avenue and at Bedford Avenue were about one-fifth complete. Starting in August 2018, the MTA would close the tunnels for 15 weekends in preparation for the full-time closure the following year.

In the original plan, there were to be three groups of 150 contractors, with each group working 8-hour shifts. The demolition and replacement of the tunnels' wire duct banks, or benchwalls, were to take up much the project's duration. A dust collection machine, which was custom-ordered for the 14th Street Tunnel project, was to include ventilation and dust filtration systems that allow dust to be contained within the tunnels. The dust was to be taken out of the tunnels via flatbed cars that travel to the shafts at Avenue A in Manhattan and Driggs Avenue in Brooklyn. The demolition was to be completed within three months, after which work on the new station entrances and replacement duct banks would commence. The tracks within the tunnels were also to be replaced. These repairs would be able to last up to eighty years.

Following the January 2019 announcement that the shutdown would instead be a partial closure, Cuomo and the MTA board unveiled some new details about the project. Rather than completely replacing the benchwall, workers would install new cable ducts on the sides of the existing tunnel walls, and the existing ducts would be abandoned. The technique of racking the cables on the wall differed from previous proposals, in that a rack, rather than the cables themselves, would be bolted onto the wall. The benchwalls would be repaired with epoxy and fiberglass as necessary, then converted into emergency egress walkways. By using this approach, less silica would need to be extracted from the tunnels because the benchwalls would not be entirely demolished. Fiber-optic and lidar sensors would be installed to allow MTA workers to more easily track imminent failures in the benchwalls. Station and track improvements would continue under the revised proposal. The repairs could last for up to forty years, and work might be elongated due to the need to maintain weekday service.

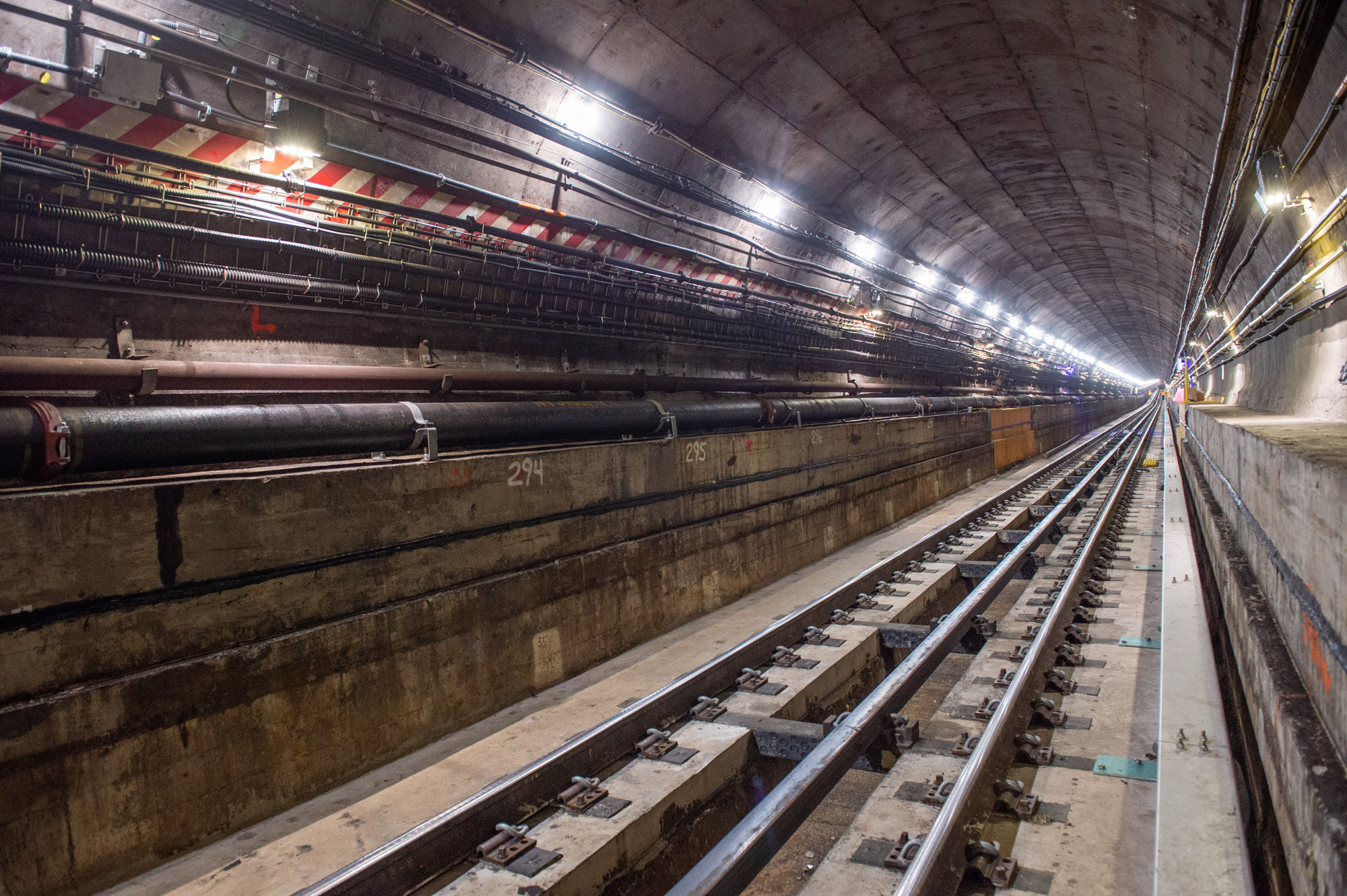
The 14th Street Tunnel after rehabilitation

The new plan meant that only 1% of the benchwall would have to be removed, namely the concrete surrounding 96 manholes. By the original closure date for the Canarsie tubes in April 2019, nearly half of that work had been completed. According to the New York Daily News, the extent of the work being done could result in a shortened service suspension. However, the change in plans led to delays in the rehabilitation of the Canarsie Line's five stations within Manhattan. As of August 2019 the improvements were not set to start until 2020, whereas under the previous plan, the stations would have been renovated while the tunnel was closed. This could potentially increase the cost budgeted for these renovations, from $43.8 to $77.8 million. By September 2019, Cuomo announced that the shutdown work was progressing ahead of schedule and was set to be completed in April 2020. At that point, the Manhattan-bound tube's repairs had been finished, and work was starting on the Brooklyn-bound tube.

On April 26, 2020, Cuomo announced the completion of the project, months ahead of schedule. The expedited completion date was affected by the COVID-19 pandemic in New York City, which sharply reduced ridership in the final weeks of the project. Work on the Bedford and First Avenues stations was also progressing. However, regular service was not restored after the project's completion; the lack of ridership during the pandemic had reduced the frequency of trains as well, under the MTA's essential service plan. After the project was completed, the MTA had to consistently monitor the tunnels for signs of further degradation. There was comparatively little discussion on the cable racks' effectiveness until 2025, when the MTA suggested that a similar system of racks be installed in the East River railroad tunnels, a suggestion that the tunnels' owner Amtrak rejected.

== Effects ==
After the shutdown was announced in 2016, some Williamsburg residents let their leases expire in 2018. As a result, housing prices began to decrease. The rate of housing vacancies in August 2018 was 25% more than the rate twelve months prior. After the plans were changed to a partial shutdown, a report published in early 2020 showed that median housing rents in Williamsburg increased significantly compared to late 2018.

An independently made documentary, being produced by Ian Mayer and Emmett Adler and titled End of the Line, is being made about the effects of the 14th Street Tunnel shutdown. A board game, released in January 2019, also satirizes the shutdown.

== See also ==
- 2017 New York City transit crisis, a state of emergency declared on the New York City Subway
