= Mary E. Larimer =

American psychologist and academic

- Education: University of Washington (B.S; M.S; Ph.D)

Mary E. Larimer is an American psychologist and academic. Larimer is a professor of psychiatry and Behavioral sciences, Professor or Psychology, and the Director of the Center for the Study of Health & Risk Behaviors at University of Washington (UW). Additionally, she serves as a psychologist at the Psychiatry Clinic at UW Medical Center-Roosevelt.

== Early life and education ==
Dr. Larimer earned her B.S. in psychology in 1987, M.S. in clinical psychology in 1990 and a Ph.D. in clinical psychology in 1992 all from UW. She was appointed to the department faculty at UW in 1995.

== Career and Research ==
Dr. Larimer's research include prevention and treatment of alcohol and drug problems among adolescents and young adults, prediction of initiation of drinking and adulthood substance use, and comorbidity of substance use with depression, suicide, trauma, PTSD, disordered eating, and gambling problems. Her research also evaluates housing and treatment programs for chronically homeless and incarcerated individuals and disseminates evidence-based prevention and treatment approaches into various, relevant settings. Dr. Larimer is currently funded by the National Institutes of Health (NIH) National Institute on Alcohol Abuse and Addiction (NIAAA). The grants include research on social norms & skills training on college campuses and the development of brief interventions for alcohol, marijuana, and sleep problems in young adults.

== Publications ==
Dr. Larimer has over 150 publications and has been cited over 24,000 times.

1. Marlatt, G Alan, Baer, John S, Kivlahan, Daniel R, Dimeff, Linda A, Larimer, Mary E, Quigley, Lori A, . . . Williams, Ellen. (1998). Screening and brief intervention for high-risk college student drinkers: Results from a 2-year follow-up assessment. Journal of Consulting and Clinical Psychology., 66(4), 604–615.
2. LARIMER, M. E., PALMER, R. S., & MARLATT, G. A. (1999, Spring). Relapse Prevention An Overview of Marlatt's Cognitive-Behavioral Model. Alcohol Research & Health, 23(2), 151.
3. Larimer, M. E., Turner, A. P., Mallett, K. A., & Geisner, I. M. (2004). Predicting drinking behavior and alcohol-related problems among fraternity and sorority members: Examining the role of descriptive and injunctive norms. Psychology of Addictive Behaviors, 18(3), 203–212.
4. Bowen, S., Witkiewitz, K., Dillworth, T. M., Chawla, N., Simpson, T. L., Ostafin, B. D., . . . Marlatt, G. A. (2006). Mindfulness meditation and substance use in an incarcerated population. Psychology of Addictive Behaviors, 20(3), 343–347.
5. Bowen S, Witkiewitz K, Clifasefi SL, et al. Relative Efficacy of Mindfulness-Based Relapse Prevention, Standard Relapse Prevention, and Treatment as Usual for Substance Use Disorders: A Randomized Clinical Trial. JAMA Psychiatry. 2014;71(5):547–556. doi:10.1001/jamapsychiatry.2013.4546
6. Parker M, Duran B, Rhew I, Magarati M, Larimer M, Donovan D. Risk and Protective Factors Associated with Moderate and Acute Suicidal Ideation among a National Sample of Tribal College and University Students 2015-2016 [published online ahead of print, 2020 Sep 7]. J Rural Health. 2020;10.
7. Grazioli VS, Studer J, Larimer ME, et al. Protective behavioral strategies and alcohol outcomes: Impact of mood and personality disorders [published online ahead of print, 2020 Aug 18]. Addict Behav. 2020;112:106615.
