= Red Hook Star-Revue =

Newspaper published in Brooklyn

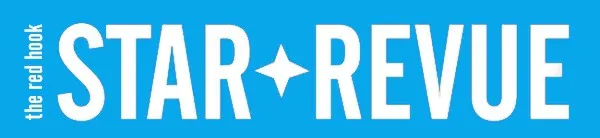
- Masthead
- Type: Local news
- Format: Monthly broadsheet
- Owner: George Fiala
- Founder: George Fiala
- Staff writers: Brett Yates, Dario Pio Muccilli (Overseas)
- Founded: June 2010; 15 years ago
- Headquarters: 481 Van Brunt Street Suite 11AR
- City: Brooklyn
- Country: United States
- Sister newspapers: Amagansett Star-Revue
- Website: www.star-revue.com

The Red Hook Star-Revue is a local newspaper servicing Red Hook, Carroll Gardens, and the Columbia Waterfront neighborhoods of Brooklyn. The Red Hook Star-Revue publishes monthly editions and was established by George Fiala.

== History ==
The Red Hook Star-Revue was founded in June 2010 by George Fiala. Fiala, a graduate of Franklin & Marshall College class of 1954, initially sought employment as a radio journalist, however, with the decline of radio as a medium for television, Fiala instead signed on as the general manager of The Villager, and its sister Brooklyn newspaper The Phoenix. In 1988 he left the world of journalism to establish a mailing service, saving up money until he could establish his own newspaper in 2010. Fiala established the newspaper in Red Hook, stating that the neighborhood was full of interesting stories, yet had no local newspaper, and sought to fill this niche. Fiala decided to name the newspaper the Star-Revue since he operated out of the Star Theater building, and as a homage to his original radio news employer, WRHY, a Starview-based station, with Starview being a neighborhood of York, Pennsylvania. The Red Hook Star-Revue is distributed for free, mostly in restaurants, bars, and supermarkets, operating with revenue from ads in the paper. The Red Hook Star-Revue is a member of the New York State Press Association, and won the IPPIE award from the Craig Newmark Graduate School of Journalism at the City University of New York in 2023 and 2022.

Despite the ads, the Red Hook Star-Revue still does not make a profit, and Fiala has to largely subsidize the newspaper from revenue from his mail service. Additionally, the paper opened at the same time as a massive downsizing of local news, with more than 100 local newspapers shutting down from 2009 to 2010. Fiala, and the Red Hook Star-Revue, focus their efforts on attracting millennials. The newspaper only has one full time journalist, Brett Yates, and has an overall Democratic leaning, albeit "subversive" with Yates and the newspaper publishing an op-ed against Andrew Cuomo advancing his political career in 2018 titled Do Not Let Andrew Cuomo Become President.

In 2020, the Red Hook Star Revue covered the outbreak of the COVID-19 pandemic in Italy, as well as its societal, artistic and political impact with a series of articles written by Dario Pio Muccilli, who currently works as the newspaper's foreign correspondent in Europe. In this capacity, Muccilli has covered news such as the Russian invasion of Ukraine, the use of social media by the Uffizi Museum in Florence, as well as several electoral rounds including Italy, France, Germany, and the European Union.

The Red Hook Star-Revue would be sued by one Helayne Seidman, claiming copyright infringement on July 1, 2021, but by August 17 Seidman voluntarily dismissed the case.

The Red Hook Star-Revue would gain notability in local media publishing stories following the dumping of pollutants into the Buttermilk Channel by cruise ships, as well as the local discontent with cruise ships and their passengers, resulting in overcrowding of the neighborhood and a drop in revenue. Additionally, their report on American Stevedoring being removed from the Red Hook Container Terminal was also circulated in local media. As well as their report on gas outages at the Red Hook Houses.

The Red Hook Star-Revue also runs local political debates, namely for the 38th district of the New York City Council.

In 2023 the newspaper opened a sister publication, the Amagansett Star-Revue, operating out of Amagansett, New York, after Fiala inherited a summer home there. Then in 2024 Fiala returned to his newspaper roots by founding the Village Star-Revue, covering Greenwich Village (the East Village and West Village) and SoHo/Tribeca. Among the Village Star Revue's current contributors are cartoonist Stan Mack, novelist Michele Herman, poet Jeffrey Cyphers Wright, biographer Victor Bockris, and art journalists Stephen DiLauro and Lee Klein.
