= Atlantic Basin (disambiguation) =

The Atlantic Basin is the Atlantic Ocean.

Atlantic Basin may also refer to:

- Atlantic Basin Iron Works, an ironworks that operated in Brooklyn, New York, in the early to mid-20th century
- Atlantic Basin, an earlier name of the Brooklyn Cruise Terminal
