= Mr. Beller's Neighborhood =

Literary website founded by Thomas Beller

- Website type: Creative nonfiction, vignette, literature
- Available in: English
- Headquarters: New York City, {{{location_country}}}
- Owner: Thomas Beller
- Creator: Thomas Beller
- Editor: Jacob Margolies
- Key people: Thomas Beller, Bryan Charles, Marisa Bowe, Phillip Lopate, Sabin Streeter, Jonathan Ames, Said Sayrafiezadeh, Joanna Yas.
- Website: mrbellersneighborhood.com
- Launched: 2000

Mr. Beller's Neighborhood is a literary website focused on true stories set in New York City that was founded in 2000 by author Thomas Beller. It publishes original, previously unpublished non-fiction essays and vignettes.

== History ==
It was one of the first websites to use a map as a way of organizing stories, initially using a satellite photo. In 2005 it switched to Google Maps.

After the 9/11 attacks, the site became "the locus for a growing collaborative history," and in 2002, it was nominated for a Webby Award in the Print and Zine category.

It has published over a thousand original pieces of writing including work by authors: Michael Cunningham, Nick Tosches, Jonathan Ames, Sam Lipsyte, Rachel Sherman, Alexander Chancellor, Bryan Charles, Thomas Beller, Meghan Daum, Lucy Sante, Alicia Erian, Rachel Cline, Vince Passaro, Jeanette Winterson, Peter Nolan Smith, Debbie Nathan, Anne Meara, and Madison Smartt Bell.

It has published two anthologies of original work first published on the site: "Before and After: Stories From New York", and "Lost and Found: Stories From New York".
