= Stan Mack =

American cartoonist

Stanley Mack
- Born: May 13, 1936 (age 90) Brooklyn, New York, United States
- Area: Cartoonist
- Notable works: Stan Mack's Real Life Funnies
- Spouses: Gail Kredenser (m. 1966) Janet Bode (m. 1981; died 1999) Susan Champlin (m. 2010)
- Children: 2 sons

Stan Mack (born 13 May 1936) is an American cartoonist, illustrator, and author best known for his observational comic strip Stan Mack's Real Life Funnies, which ran in The Village Voice for more than 20 years. He was an early pioneer of documentary cartooning and graphic journalism.

Mack is the author of numerous graphic nonfiction books addressing a wide range of social and historical topics.

His work has appeared in publications including Esquire, New York magazine, Modern Maturity, Print, and Natural History among others.

== Early life and education ==
Mack was born in Brooklyn but grew up in Providence, Rhode Island. He graduated from the Rhode Island School of Design in 1958 with a degree in illustration.

He served in the United States Army, stationed at the United States Military Academy at West Point, in the Department of Social Sciences. In 1960, his work won first place in an all-Army art contest in the Drawings and Cartoons category.

== Art director ==
In the early 1960s, Mack moved to New York and found work as an art director. His first job was at a pulp publication called Climax. He was later hired to be art director of the New York Herald Tribune’s Book Week, until the publication closed in 1968.

In 1966, Mack joined The New York Times as the art director of the New York Times office of Educational Activities where he oversaw The New York Times School Weekly. From 1968 to 1969, Mack was the art director for the New York Times Book Review and later The New York Times Sunday Magazine from 1972 to 1974. During this period, his artistic influences included designers and art directors Peter Palazzo, Henry Wolf, Herb Lubalin, Milton Glaser, Saul Bass, and George Lois; and journalists Jimmy Breslin and Dennis Duggan.

Mack ultimately resigned from The New York Times to explore his interest in drawing real people.

== Illustrator and cartoonist ==
Beginning in the early 1960s, and during his time working as an art director, Mack also worked as a freelance illustrator. Working with other writers, he illustrated five children's books from 1996 to 1973; he wrote and illustrated four more children's books from 1974 to 1983.

In the early 1970s, while still the art director of the New York Times Magazine, Mack started experimenting with the comic strip format. In 1972 he created Mule's Diner for the National Lampoon. Set against the familiar backdrop of a diner, the strip combined meticulous cross-hatching with dreamlike narratives, blending the ordinary and the uncanny. Though less known than Mack’s later reportage work, it has been praised for its originality and lasting, indelible imagery.

Around this time, he began contributing nonfiction comic strips to The New York Times for the travel and lifestyle sections of the paper. In 1973, he accompanied reporter Georgia Dullea on a feature story assignment, creating sketches to complement Dullea’s article. But when he started jotting down overheard dialogue, Dullea discovered that Mack’s quotes were better than hers.

=== The Village Voice: Stan Mack’s Real Life Funnies ===
In 1974, Mack met with graphic designer Milton Glaser, who was then redesigning The Village Voice. Mack proposed that he wander the city, sketching and writing down overheard conversations, and create a one-time piece for the paper. Glaser agreed but asked him to do it as a weekly comic strip.

The resulting Stan Mack’s Real Life Funnies was notable for its semi-documentary feel, with dialogue drawn from Mack's own observations. When it appeared in the paper, a line above the comic strip read, "Guarantee: All Dialogue Reported Verbatim." The guarantee changed in the 1980s to "All Dialogue Overheard" and then to "All Dialogue in People's Own Words."

The earliest strips were comic snapshots. Mack would hang out in public places, bars mostly, and eavesdrop on conversations. Over the years, he addressed more complex topics—including AIDS, gentrification, racism, and homelessness — and the strips lengthened into short stories while maintaining much of the ironic bite of the early work.

Mack said of the strip, "This job gave me an excuse to accost people, to be pushy and aggressive.... I learned to take notes on my shirt cuffs and walk backward into crowds. But most of all, I learned to listen to what ordinary people have to say."

A musical revue based on dialogue appearing in the comic strip was staged by the Manhattan Theatre Club in 1981. The production, called Real Life Funnies, was written by Howard Ashman with songs by Alan Menken and featured performances by Janie Sell, Pamela Blair and Dale Soules.

Stan Mack's Real Life Funnies ran in the Village Voice from 1974 until 1995, when the paper's editor dropped the strip along with several other features, despite protest from Voice staffers.

A collection of his work for The Village Voice was published in 2024 by Fantagraphics.

=== AdWeek: Out Takes ===
Starting in 1981, Mack's Adweek comic strip, Stan Mack’s Outtakes, covered the New York media scene for more than a decade. The strip focused on the nuances, idiosyncrasies, and humor of the advertising business. To create the strip, Mack visited commercial shoots, creative meetings, new business pitches, and strategy sessions at agencies around New York City. If requested, Mack would disguise the identity of the agencies, executives, or products mentioned in the meetings.

=== Janet & Me ===
Mack created a monthly comic strip series called Dispatches for The New York Times Suburban Sections. One strip in 2000 caused controversy when he chronicled the last days of the life of his partner, Janet Bode, who died of breast cancer on December 30, 1999. Following Bode’s death at the age of 56, Mack wrote and drew Janet & Me: An Illustrated Story of Love and Loss as a memoir of their life as a couple, his time as her caregiver, and her experience fighting the disease. The book highlighted the lack of transparency between patients and doctors, and the torment of dealing with insurance companies.

While promoting the memoir about Bode, Mack became an outspoken voice for caregiving and participated in panel discussions about coping with cancer.

=== Other publications ===
In 1995, as part of a redesign, Mack created a comic strip for Modern Maturity magazine called Stan Mack’s True Tales. This was followed in 1997 by a series of docu-comics for Natural History magazine.

Mack continued to profile the media and advertising business with a strip called Stan Mack’s Real Mad: True Tales from Inside the Ad Biz which began publication in MediaPost in 2014.

Stan Mack’s Real Lives ran on whowhatwhy.org from 2021–2022.

A collection of Mack’s original children’s book illustrations, proofs, and books is archived at the Elmer L. Anderson Library at the University of Minnesota.

Since 2025, Mack has been a regular contributor to the Village Star-Review/Red Hook Star-Review.

== Personal life ==
Mack met his first wife, Gail Kredenser, when the two worked at the New York Herald Tribune. The couple were married in 1966 and had two sons.

Mack had an 18-year relationship with the writer Janet Bode.

Mack married writer-editor Susan Champlin in 2010. The couple have collaborated on two historical graphic novels for young people: The Pickpocket, the Spy, and the Lobsterbacks (original title Road to Revolution!) and Our Fight, Our Time, (original title Fight for Freedom).

Mack lived in New York’s Greenwich Village neighborhood for more than 30 years.

== Honors and awards ==
- 2026 National Newspaper Association’s Better Newspaper Contest, first place Best Original Editorial Cartoon for his work with Red Hook Star-Review.
- 2025 The New York City Book Awards (winner for Stan Mack's Real Life Funnies: The Collected Conceits, Delusions, and Hijinks of New Yorkers from 1974 to 1995).
- 2025 (nomination) Eisner Award for Best Archival Collection/Project—Strips (for Stan Mack's Real Life Funnies: The Collected Conceits, Delusions, and Hijinks of New Yorkers from 1974 to 1995).

== Bibliography ==
=== Children’s books ===
- (as illustrator, with writer Gail Kredenser) The ABC of Bumptious Beasts. Harlin Quist. 1966.
- (as illustrator, with writer Ennis Rees) Potato Talk. Pantheon Books. 1969. ISBN 978-0-394-82800-8.
- (as illustrator, with writer Gail Kredenser) 1, One Dancing Drum: A Counting Book for Children (and Parents) who are Tired of Puppies and Chickens and Horses. S. G. Phillips. 1971. ISBN 978-0-87599-178-8. — winner of The New York Times Best Illustrated Children’s Book of the Year 1971)
- (as illustrator, with writer George Keenen)The Preposterous Week. Dial Press. 1971. ISBN 978-0-8037-7071-3.
- (as illustrator, with writer Paula Scher) The Brownstone. Pantheon Books. 1973. ISBN 978-0-394-82487-1.
- 10 Bears in My Bed: A Goodnight Countdown. Pantheon Books. 1974. ISBN 978-0-394-92902-6.
- Where's My Cheese?. Pantheon Books. 1977. ISBN 978-0-394-93452-5.
- Runaway Road. Dutton. 1980. ISBN 978-0-525-31017-4.
- Belmont the Bat Catcher: And Other Nutty Number Tales. Scholastic. 1983. ISBN 978-0-590-31874-7.

=== Non-fiction ===
- (as illustrator, with writer Janet Bode) Heartbreak and Roses: Real Life Stories of Troubled Love. Delacorte Press. 1994. ISBN 978-0-385-32068-9.
- (as illustrator, with writer Janet Bode) Hard Time: A Real Life Look at Juvenile Crime and Violence. Bantam Doubleday Dell Books for Young Readers. 1996. ISBN 978-0-440-21953-8. — selected as an American Bookseller Pick of the Lists
- (as illustrator, with writer Janet Bode) For Better, for Worse: A Guide to Surviving Divorce for Preteens and Their Families. Simon & Schuster Books for Young Readers. 2001. ISBN 978-0-689-81945-2.

=== Graphic novels ===
- The Story of the Jews: A 4,000-year Adventure. Villard. 1998. ISBN 978-0-375-50130-2.
- Janet & Me: An Illustrated Story of Love and Loss. Simon and Schuster. 2004. ISBN 978-0-684-87278-0.
- (with writer Susan Champlin) The Pickpocket, the Spy, and the Lobsterbacks: a Graphic Novel of the American Revolution. About Comics. 2024. ISBN 978-1949996623.; formerly Road to Revolution!. The Cartoon Chronicles of America. Scholastic. 2009. ISBN 978-0-545-32815-9. — Junior Library Guild Selection 2010; NCSS Notable Social Studies Trade Books for Young People 2010
- Revolting Rebels: a History in Comics of the American Revolution. About Comics. 2023. ISBN 978-1949996647.; formerly Taxes, the Tea Party, and Those Revolting Rebels: A History in Comics of the American Revolution. NBM Publishing. 2012. ISBN 978-1561636976.
- (with writer Susan Champlin) Our Fight, Our Time: a Graphic Novel of the Civil War. About Comics. 2024. ISBN 978-1949996630.; formerly Fight for Freedom. Bloomsbury Publishing USA. 2012. ISBN 978-1-59990-014-8.

=== Collections ===
- Stan Mack's Outtakes. Overlook Press. 1984. ISBN 978-0-87951-997-1.
- Stan Mack's Real Life Funnies: The Collected Conceits, Delusions, and Hijinks of New Yorkers from 1974 to 1995. Fantagraphics. 2024. ISBN 978-1683969167.
