= Buttermilk Channel =

Strait in New York City, United States

Coordinates: 40°41′06″N 74°00′54″W

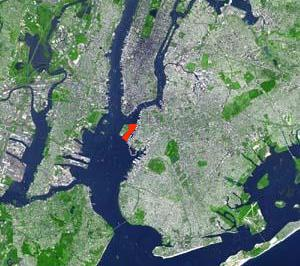
The Buttermilk Channel, shown in red, in Upper New York Bay

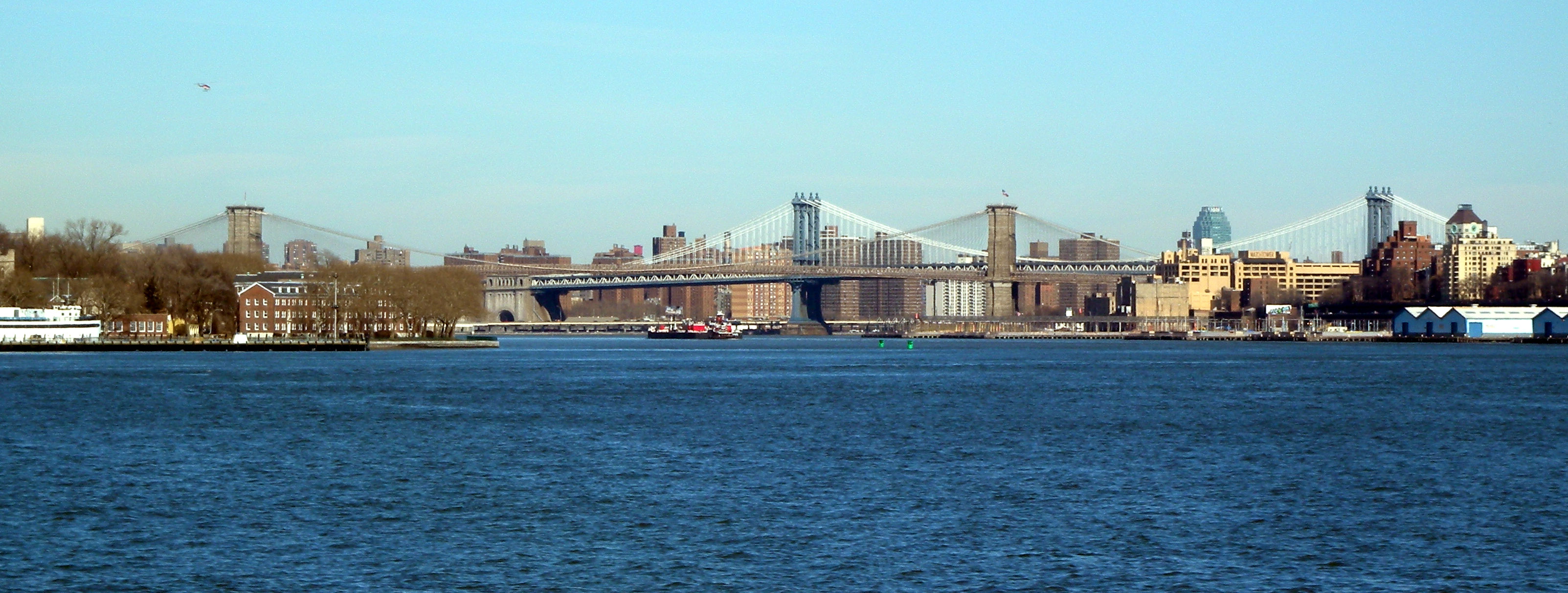
Looking north through the channel

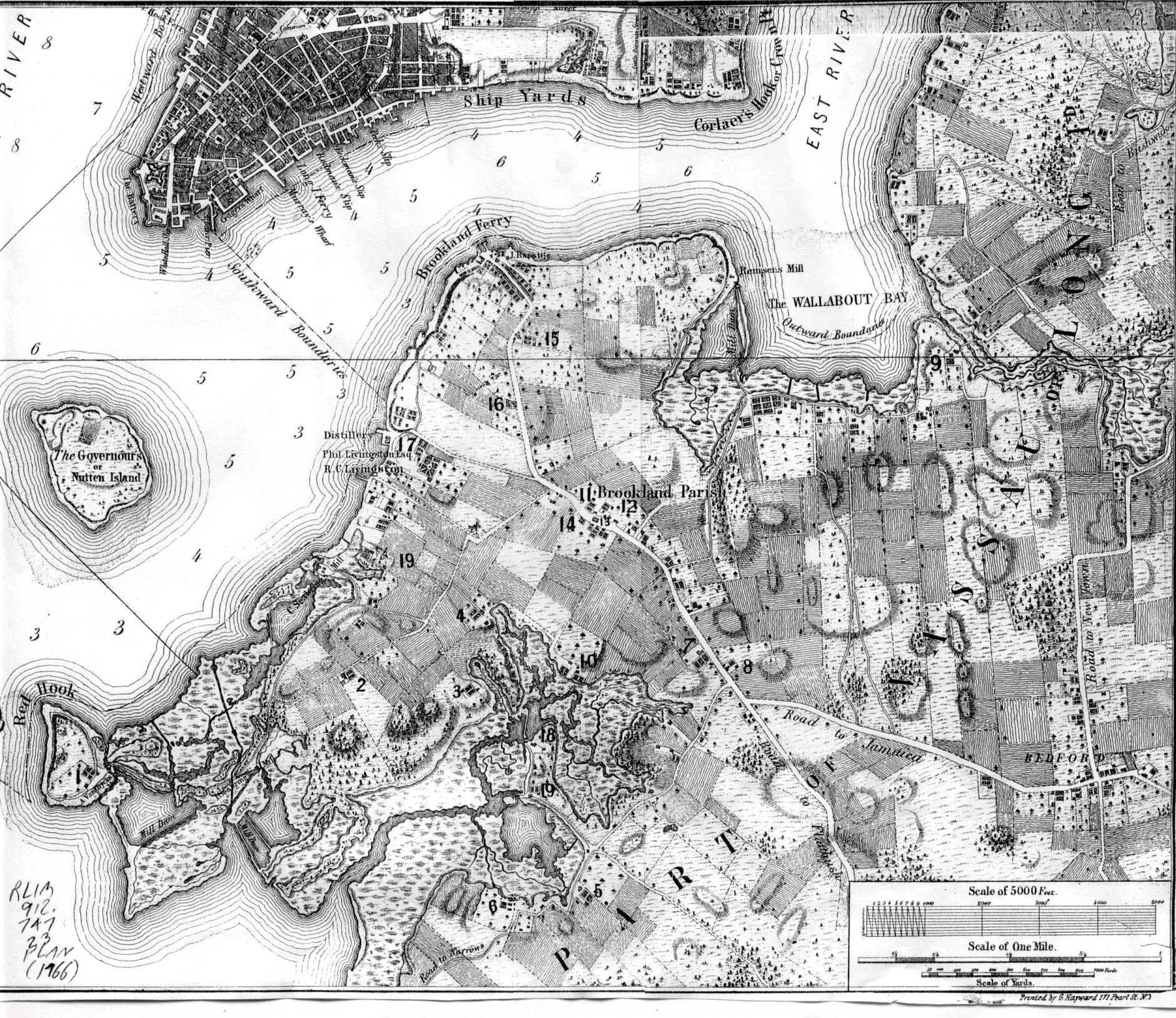
1766 map indicating 4-fathom (24 ft; 7.3 m) depth of channel and width half a mile (800m)

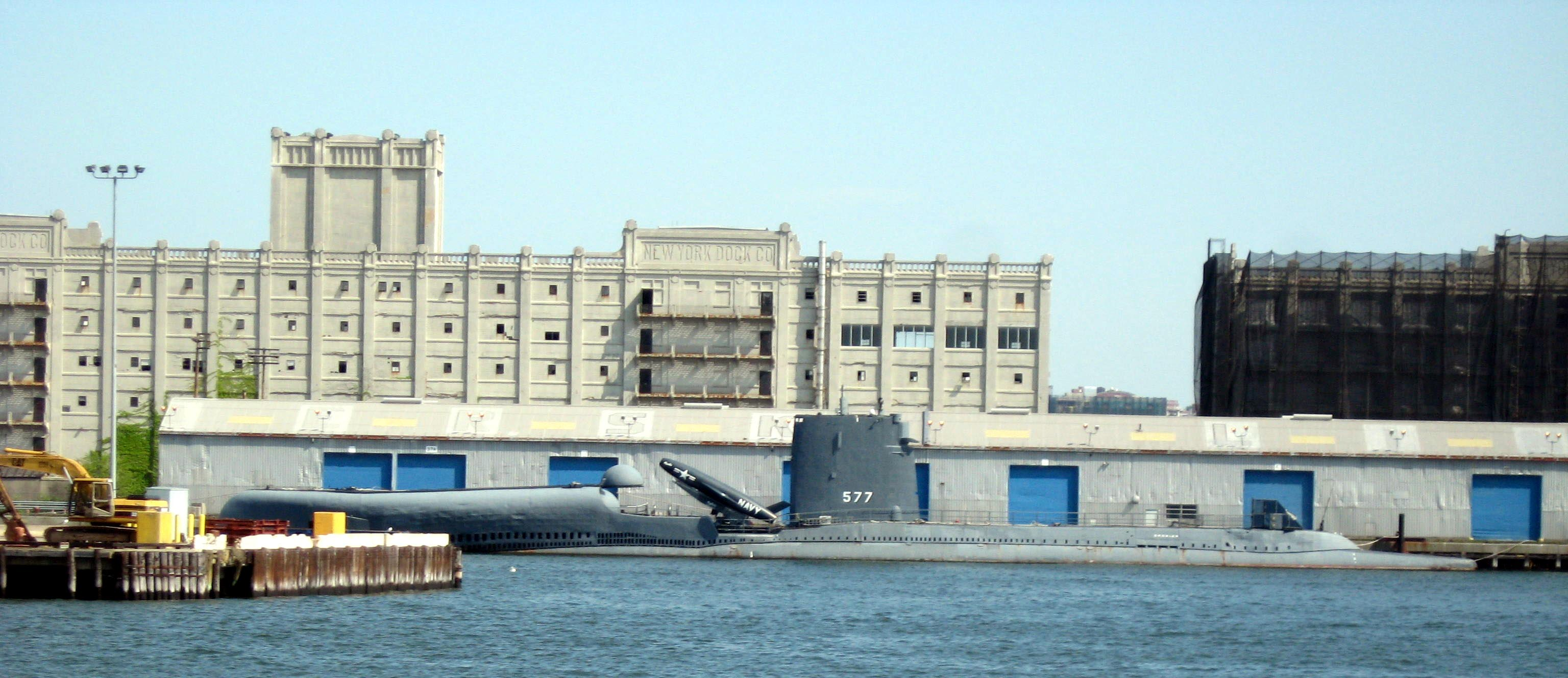
The Atlantic Basin in Red Hook, Brooklyn

Buttermilk Channel is a small tidal strait in Upper New York Bay in New York City, approximately 1 mile (1.6 km) long and 0.25 miles (0.40 km) wide, separating Governors Island from Brooklyn. The channel is marked by a number of navigation aids (green cans no. 5 and 7 at the northeast entrance, and green gong no. 1, marking low water off the tip of Governors Island). Tidal currents on the channel are rather strong.

== History ==
Origins of the name are uncertain but it is alleged to be a reference to the dairy farmers who used to cross this channel by boat to sell their milk in Manhattan markets. Some people believe that the channel got its name because crossing it was so rough that the farmers' milk was churned into butter by the time they reached Manhattan. According to another legend, before the channel was dredged to accommodate cargo ships, cows were walked across it at low tide to graze on Governors Island. In his newspaper articles about Brooklyn history, Walt Whitman wrote of a time "as late as the Revolutionary War (when) cattle were driven across from Brooklyn, over what is now Buttermilk Channel, to Governor's Island." In the bitter volcanic winter of 1817—the volcanic winter following the "Year Without a Summer"—when the thermometer dropped to −26 °F (−32 °C), the waters of the Upper Bay froze so hard that horse-drawn sleighs were driven across Buttermilk Channel to Governors Island.

On the Brooklyn side, modern development started in the 1840s, when the Atlantic Basin and docks, and the "Erie Basin" were started. The former is now the Red Hook Container Port, the Brooklyn Cruise Terminal, and the Red Hook stop of the NYC Ferry SB route while the latter is now the site of the Brooklyn IKEA.

In 1902, the channel was dredged extensively by the U.S. Army Corps of Engineers. Subsequent modifications were made in 1913, 1935 and 1962. With current charted depths of 35 to 40 feet (11 to 12 m), Buttermilk Channel is still a busy shipping lane offering the most convenient access to the Brooklyn waterfront. Until the late 20th century the primary user of the channel was the U.S. Coast Guard, which had a local headquarters on Governors Island.

In April 2015, the Army Corps of Engineers issued a Request for Proposals for additional maintenance dredging of Buttermilk Channel. The channel was fully dredged in fiscal year 2016.

== See also ==
- Geography of New York–New Jersey Harbor Estuary
