= Rachel Cline =

American writer

- Born: 1957 (age 68–69); Brooklyn, New York, U.S.
- Education: Oberlin College; Columbia University
- Occupations: Novelist; Essayist
- Writing career
- Language: English
- Notable works: The Question Authority; My Liar; What to Keep
- Website: www.rachelcline.com

Rachel Cline (born 1957) is an American novelist and essayist based in Brooklyn, New York. She has authored three novels, The Question Authority (2019), My Liar (2008) and What to Keep (2004). She has also written essays and reviews for various publications including the Los Angeles Review of Books and The New York Times. Cline’s writing often explores themes of memory, relationships and cultural identity.

== Early life ==
Cline was born in 1957 and grew up in Brooklyn, New York. She earned a Bachelor of Arts degree from Oberlin College and later obtained a Master of Fine Arts in creative writing from Columbia University School of the Arts. Her academic training and upbringing in Brooklyn played an important role in her development as a writer, influencing her storytelling techniques and thematic choices in her literary works.

== Career ==
Cline’s first novel, What to Keep, was published in 2004, followed by My Liar in 2008. These early works focused on themes of identity, memory, and personal relationships.

In 2019, Cline released her third novel, The Question Authority which explored themes of justice, abuse, and memory within the context of the #MeToo movement.

In addition to her novels, Cline has contributed essays and reviews to publications such as the Los Angeles Review of Books, More (magazine) and The New York Times. Cline has also taught creative writing at the New York University, Sarah Lawrence College and Eugene Lang College. She has participated in artist residencies, including Yaddo and Sewanee: The University of the South and has mentored aspiring writers through programs such as Girls Write Now.

== Works ==
=== What to Keep (2004) ===
Cline’s debut novel, What to Keep, tells the story of a woman reflecting on her past, dealing with themes of loss, identity, and the complexities of familial relationships. The novel centers around the protagonist's relationship with her mother, and it explores the difficult choices she faces when faced with the inheritance of a family home. What to Keep received positive reviews for its exploration of family dynamics and emotional depth.

=== My Liar (2008) ===
Cline’s second novel, My Liar, shifts focus to a different set of themes. The story centers around a young woman dealing with the repercussions of a dishonest relationship and the emotional turbulence that follows. It examines the fragile nature of trust and the emotional consequences of deception. The novel was well-received for its psychological insight and its ability to create a vivid portrait of a woman confronting the tangled web of her past.

Kirkus Reviews praised My Liar for its portrayal of betrayal and self-deception, while Chicago Tribune highlighted Cline’s skill in capturing the fragility of relationships.

=== The Question Authority (2019) ===
Cline’s third novel, The Question Authority, published in 2019, tackles the themes of memory, abuse and justice in the context of the #MeToo Movement. The novel follows Nora Buchbinder, a woman who reunites with her childhood best friend and confronts a complicated history with a teacher who may have abused her friend. The novel explores questions of power, memory and justice, examining how perceptions of past events change over time and the long-lasting impact of unresolved trauma.

The Question Authority was widely praised for its timely exploration of #MeToo and its depiction of the psychological aftermath of abuse. Reviewers from major publications, such as Kirkus Reviews, described the novel as a “gripping, provocative” story that offers depth and complexity to the conversation around sexual misconduct. A review in The Red Hook Star-Revue noted the book's compelling portrayal of the characters and its ability to evoke empathy for their experiences. Cline’s writing in this book was noted for its sensitivity and emotional power, making it an important contribution to contemporary discussions about abuse and justice.
