= Thomas Beller =

American author and editor

- Born: New York City, U.S.
- Education: Saint Ann's School; Vassar College; Columbia University
- Occupations: Author, editor

Thomas Beller is an American author and editor.

== Early life ==
Born and raised in New York City, Beller has remained a resident of his native city, which often features in his stories. He is a first generation American, the son of documentary filmmaker Hava Kohav Beller, who was born in Berlin and raised in an Israeli Kibbutz. After attending Saint Ann's School in Brooklyn, New York, he received his AB from Vassar College, and his MFA from Columbia University Writing Program.

== Career ==
While still studying for his MFA, The New Yorker published Beller's short story "A Different Kind of Imperfection", which was chosen for the Best American Short Stories volume of 1992. Since, his work has appeared in such publications as The New York Times, ELLE, Spin, Vogue, Slate, and The Village Voice. He spent a year as a staff writer at The New Yorker, and later worked for The Cambodia Daily newspaper, where he remains a contributing editor. He is a contributing editor to Travel+Leisure Magazine.

Beller has penned four volumes. The first, Seduction Theory, a collection of short stories, was published in 1995. The Sleep-Over Artist, Beller's first novel, was a Los Angeles Times Best Book of 2000, and a New York Times Notable Book. His third book, How to Be a Man: Scenes from a Protracted Boyhood, is a series of autobiographical essays. His fourth book is a biography, J.D. Salinger: The Escape Artist.

He co-founded the tri-annual literary magazine Open City in 1990, which added a book division in 1999. Today, Beller and Joanna Yas are the editors of the magazine and press, which publishes many new and young writers. He has also edited three anthologies: With Love and Squalor: 14 Writers Respond to the Work of J.D. Salinger, Before and After: Stories From New York, and Personals: Dreams and Nightmares From the Lives of Twenty Young Writers.

Thomas Beller is also the creator of the literary website Mr. Beller's Neighborhood, a collection of essays, reportage, and vignettes by various authors, including Beller himself. All of the pieces are set in or about Beller's native New York City; the collection has been growing since 2000. The location of each story is marked on a map. In 2002, the site was nominated for a Webby Award in the Print and Zine category and published a book: Before and After: Stories from New York, which pivots around the September 11 attacks.

In 2009, Beller edited a second Mr. Beller's Neighborhood anthology, Lost and Found: Stories from New York.

Beller teaches at Tulane University.

== Personal life ==
Beller lives with his wife and child in New York City and New Orleans, Louisiana. Beller is Jewish.

== Bibliography ==
- Seduction Theory (1995)
- The Sleep-Over Artist (2000)
- How to be a Man: Scenes from a Protracted Boyhood (2005)
- J.D. Salinger: The Escape Artist (2014)
- Lost In The Game: A Book About Basketball (2022)
