= Red Hook, Brooklyn =

Neighborhood in New York City

Red Hook
- Neighborhood of Brooklyn
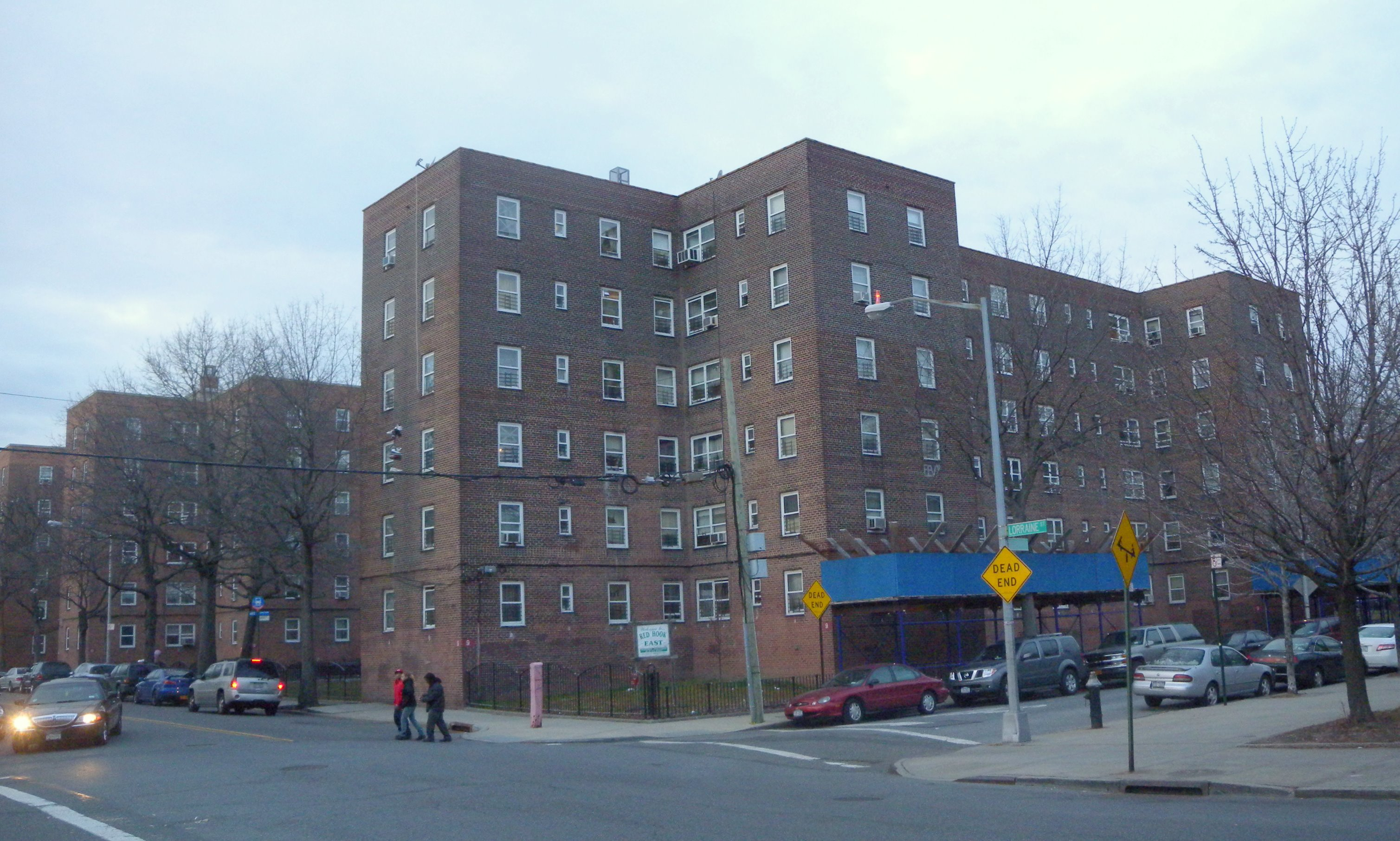
- NYCHA Red Hook Houses
- Location in New York City
- Coordinates: 40.677°N 74.011°W
- Country: United States
- State: New York
- City: New York City
- Borough: Brooklyn
- Community District: Brooklyn 6
- Settled: 1636
- Founder: The Lenape
- Named for: red clay on the point of a nearby island in the Upper New York Bay
- Time zone: UTC−5 (Eastern)
  - Summer (DST): UTC−4 (EDT)
- ZIP Code: 11231
- Area codes: 718, 347, 929, and 917

Red Hook is a neighborhood in western Brooklyn, New York City, United States, within the area once known as South Brooklyn. It is located on a peninsula projecting into the Upper New York Bay and is bounded by the Gowanus Expressway and the Carroll Gardens neighborhood on the northeast, Gowanus Canal on the east, and the Upper New York Bay on the west and south. A prosperous shipping and port area in the early 20th century, the area declined in the latter part of the century. Today, it is home to the Red Hook Houses, the largest housing project in Brooklyn.

Red Hook is part of Brooklyn Community District 6, and its primary ZIP Code is 11231. It is patrolled by the 76th Precinct of the New York City Police Department. Politically, Red Hook is represented by the New York City Council's 38th District.

== History ==
=== Colonization ===
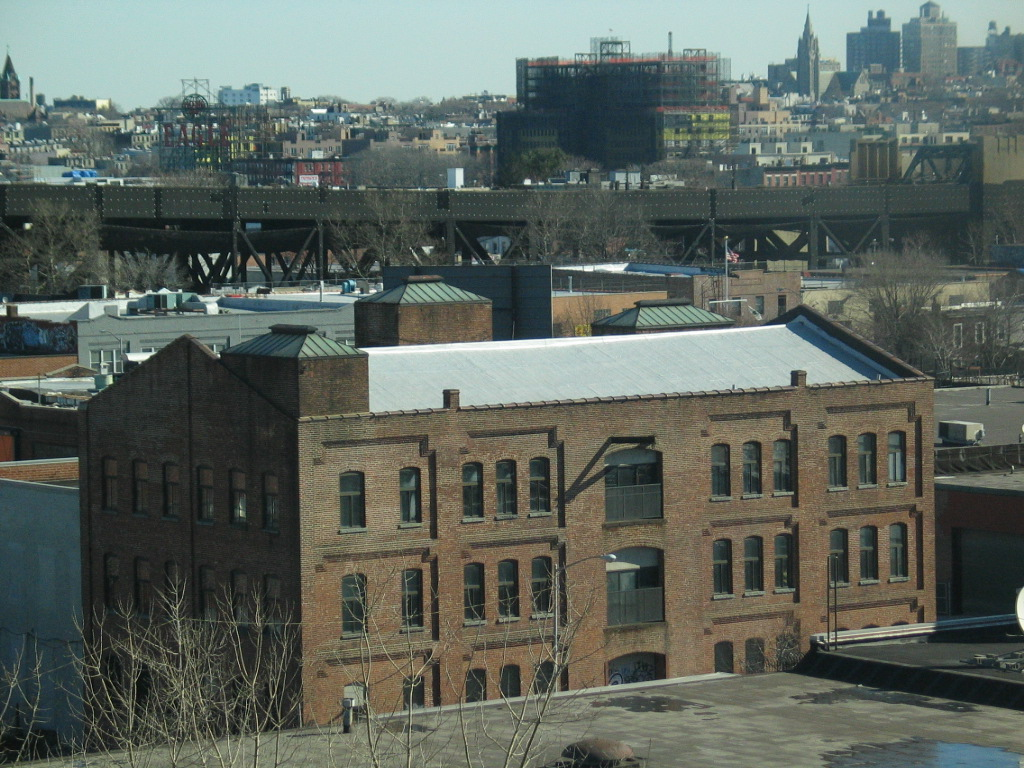
Holland-style factory building in Red Hook

The native Lenape referred to the region as Ihepetonga, meaning a high point of sandy soil. The village was settled by Dutch colonists of New Amsterdam in 1636, and named Roode Hoek, after the red clay soil and the point of land projecting into the Upper New York Bay. In Dutch, Hoek means "point" or "corner", and not the English hook (i.e., something curved or bent). The actual hoek of Red Hook was a point on an island that stuck out into Upper New York Bay at today's Dikeman Street west of Ferris Street. In 1657, Roode Hoek became part of the Town of Brooklyn.

Rapelye Street in Red Hook commemorates the beginnings of one of New Netherland's early settler families, the Rapelje clan, descended from the first European child born in the new Dutch settlement in the New World, Sarah Rapelje. She was born near Wallabout Bay, which later became the site of the New York (Brooklyn) Naval Shipyard. A couple of decades after the birth of his daughter Sarah, Joris Jansen Rapelje removed to Brooklyn, where he was one of the Council of twelve men, and where he was soon joined by son-in-law Hans Hansen Bergen. Rapelye Street in Red Hook is named for Rapelje and his descendants, who lived in Brooklyn for centuries.

=== American Revolution ===
During the Battle of Brooklyn (also known as the Battle of Long Island), Fort Defiance was constructed on the hoek. It is shown on a map called "a Map of the Environs of Brooklyn" drawn in 1780 by Loyalist engineer George S. Sproule. The Sproule map shows that the Fort Defiance complex consisted of three redoubts on a small island connected by trenches, with an earthwork on the island's south side to defend against a landing. The entire earthwork was about 1,600 feet (490 m) long and covered the entire island. The three redoubts covered an area about 400 feet (120 m) by 800 feet (240 m). The two principal earthworks were about 150 feet (46 m) by 175 feet (53 m), and the tertiary one was about 75 feet (23 m) by 100 feet (30 m). Maps from Sproule and Bernard Ratzer show that Red Hook was a low-lying area full of tidal mill ponds created by the Dutch.

General Israel Putnam came to New York on April 4, 1776, to assess the state of its defenses and strengthen them. Among the works initiated were forts on Governor's Island and Red Hook, facing the bay. On April 10, one thousand Continentals took possession of both points and began constructing Fort Defiance which mounted one three pounder cannon and four eighteen pounders. The cannons were to be fired over the tops of the fort's walls. In May, George Washington described it as "small but exceedingly strong". On July 5, General Nathanael Greene called it "a post of vast importance" and, three days later, Col. Varnum's regiment joined its garrison. On July 12, the British frigates Rose and Phoenix and the schooner Tyrol ran the gauntlet past Defiance and the stronger Governor's Island works without firing a shot, and got all the way to Tappan Zee. They stayed there for over a month, beating off harassing attacks, and finally returned to Staten Island on August 18. It appeared that gunfire from Fort Defiance did damage to the British ships.

Samuel Shaw wrote to his parents on July 15:

General Howe has arrived with the army from Halifax, which is encamped on Staten Island. On Friday, two ships and three tenders, taking advantage of a brisk gale and strong current, ran by our batteries, up the North River where they at present remain. By deserters we learn that they sustained considerable damage, being hulled in many places, and very much hurt in their rigging. So great was their hurry, that they would not stay to return our salute, though it was given with much cordiality and warmth; which they seemed very sensible of, notwithstanding their distance, which was nearly two miles.

Almost the entire New York metropolitan area was under British military occupation from the end of 1776 until November 23, 1783, when they evacuated the city.

=== Industrial era ===
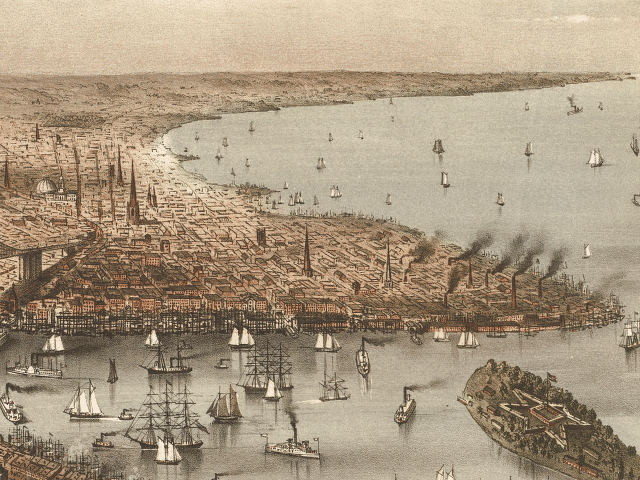
Brooklyn Heights and Red Hook circa 1875

In the 1840s, entrepreneurs began to build ports as the "offloading end" of the Erie Canal. These included the Atlantic Basin, dredged in 1850, and the Erie Basin, dredged in 1864. Simultaneously, in 1849, the New York Legislature granted permission to dredge the nearby Gowanus Creek so it could be used as a 1.5-mile (2.4 km) commercial waterway connected to Upper New York Bay. The creek's dredging was completed in 1860. Another act of the Legislature in 1867 allowed the canal to be deepened further. With the completion of the creek's dredging, Red Hook became an industrial hub, seeing up to 26,000 ships per year.

Dockworkers of various ethnicities began settling in Red Hook. African-American dockworkers began to move to Red Hook in the 1890s, while Italians had settled around Columbia Street. Many dockworkers lived in boarding houses, some of which had been speculatively built rowhouses. The industrial development also gave way to haphazard shanty towns. By the mid-1880s, a "Slab City" of 2,000 squatters and several hundred livestock had developed around Hamilton Avenue.

By the early 20th century, Red Hook had gained a reputation of decay, with organized crime having started to develop in the area. From the 1920s on, many poor and unemployed Norwegians, mostly former sailors, were living in the area in what they called Ørkenen Sur ("The Bitter Desert") around places like Hamilton Avenue and Gospel Hill. In 2015, NRK made a documentary about it in Norwegian. There is also an old documentary film about this.

=== Investment and decline ===
In the 1930s, the area was poor, and the site of the current Red Hook Houses was the site of a shack city for the homeless called a "Hooverville". Officials began looking to revitalize Red Hook at that time. The Red Hook Play Center and Red Hook Recreational Area opened in 1936 and 1940, respectively. The Red Hook Houses were completed in 1939.

In the 1990s, Life magazine named Red Hook as one of the "worst" neighborhoods in the United States and as "the crack capital of America". Patrick Daly, the principal of P.S. 15 in Red Hook, was killed in 1992 in the crossfire of a drug-related shooting while looking for a pupil who had left his school. The school was later renamed the Patrick Daly School after him, as he was beloved within the school.

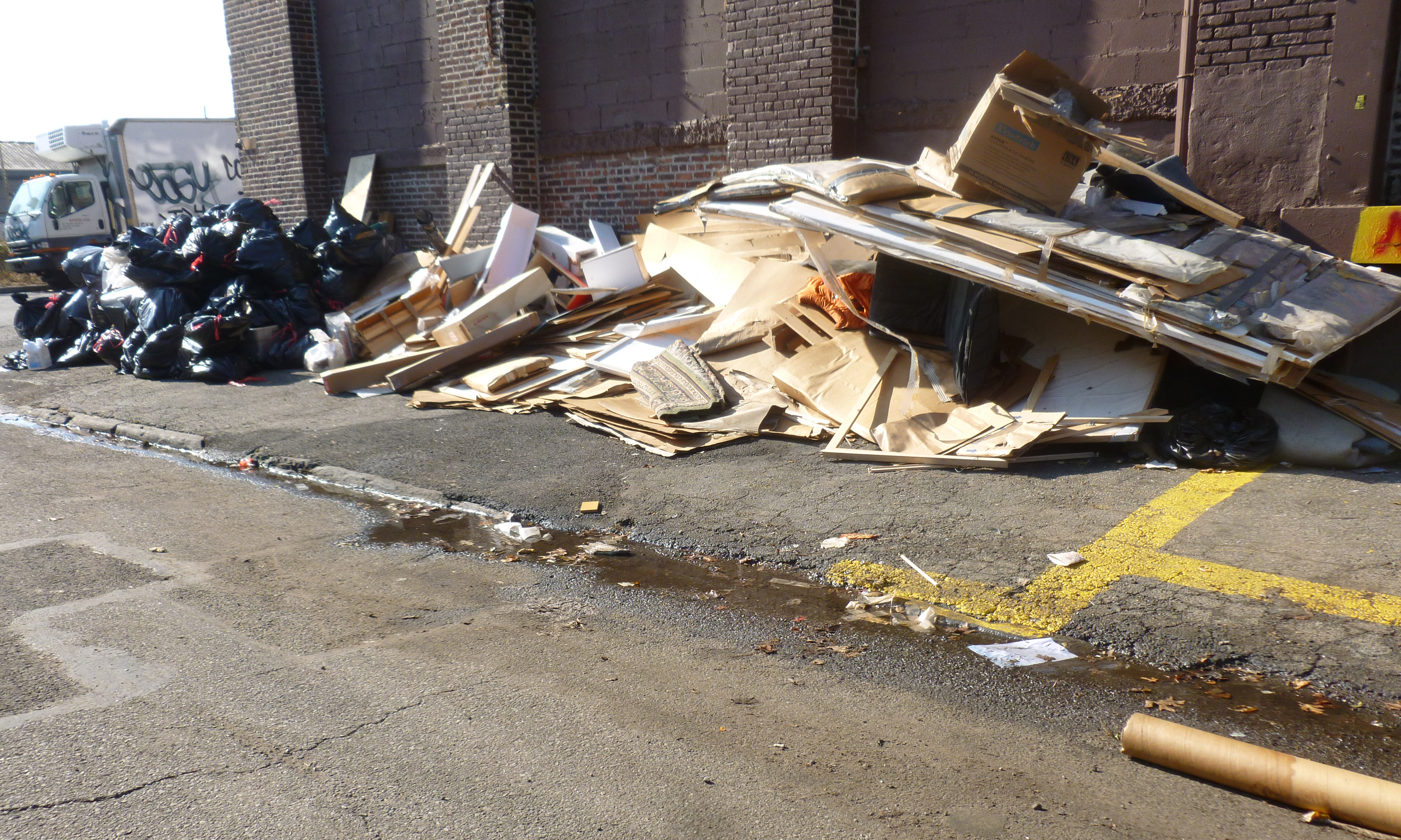
Hurricane Sandy effects seen at 610 Smith Street

In 2010, Red Hook's first community newspaper, The Red Hook Star-Revue, began publication. Red Hook was heavily damaged by Hurricane Sandy in 2012, two years later. In 2024, the New York City government took over about 120 acres (49 ha) of land on Red Hook's waterfront, with plans to redevelop it. In September 2025, a community task force voted 17–8 to approve the $3.5 billion Brooklyn Marine Terminal Vision Plan, which calls for up to 6,000 apartments (40 percent permanently affordable), a modernized 60-acre all-electric port terminal, approximately 28 acres (11 ha) of public open space, and a $200 million investment in the nearby Red Hook Houses. The plan was approved through a general project plan process rather than the standard Uniform Land Use Review Procedure, which drew opposition from some community members and local organizations.

The Mary A. Whalen and Lehigh Valley Railroad Barge No. 79 are listed on the National Register of Historic Places.

== Location ==
View of the Statue of Liberty from Louis Valentino Jr Park and Pier in Red Hook

Red Hook is a peninsula between Buttermilk Channel, Gowanus Bay, and Gowanus Canal at the southern edge of Downtown Brooklyn. Red Hook is in the area known as South Brooklyn, which, contrary to its name, is actually in western Brooklyn. This name is derived from the original City of Brooklyn which ended at Atlantic Street, now Atlantic Avenue. By the 1950s, anything south of Atlantic Avenue was considered South Brooklyn; thus, the names "Red Hook" and "South Brooklyn" were applied also to today's Carroll Gardens, Cobble Hill, Columbia Heights, and Gowanus neighborhoods. Portions of Carroll Gardens and Cobble Hill were granted landmark status in the 1970s and were carved out of Red Hook.

Red Hook has a fully frontal view of the Statue of Liberty, which was oriented to face towards the southeast, welcoming ships coming into New York Harbor.

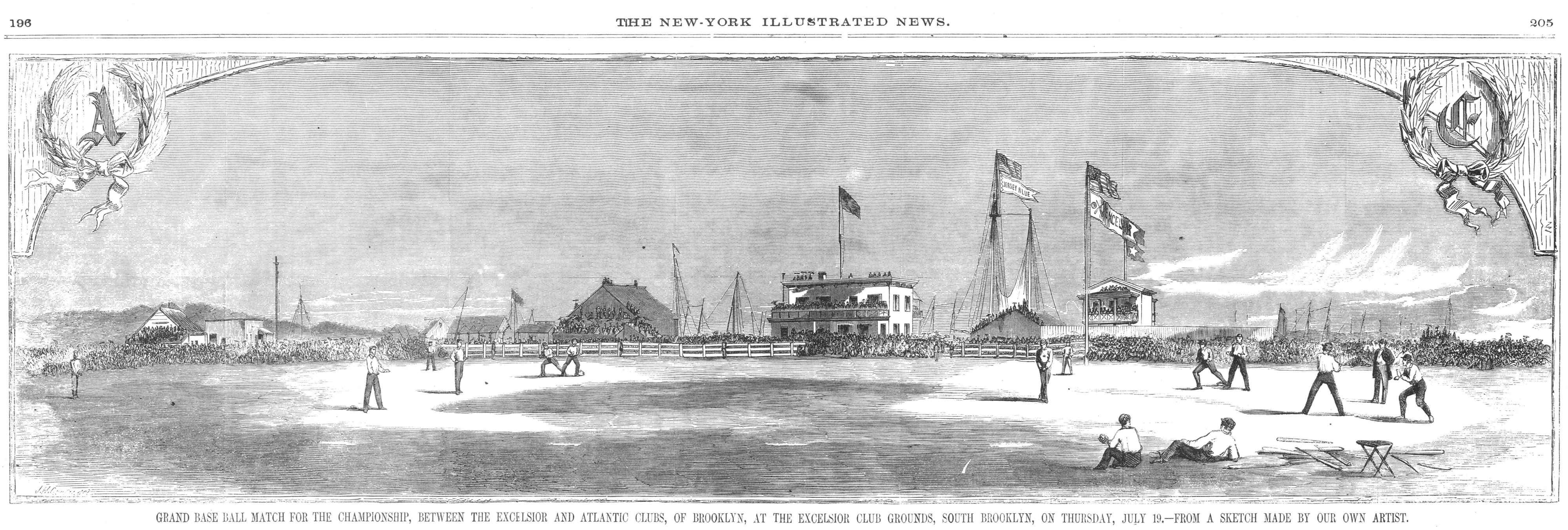
Excelsior game in 1860

Red Hook is the site of the NYCHA Red Hook Houses, the largest public housing development in Brooklyn, which accommodates about 6,000 people. Red Hook also contains several parks, including Red Hook Park. The park is in the vicinity, if not the exact location, of where the celebrated Civil War era baseball team Excelsior of Brooklyn played many of their home games. The neighborhood contains a heritage trail recalling its portion of the Battle of Brooklyn in the revolutionary war.

=== IKEA controversy ===
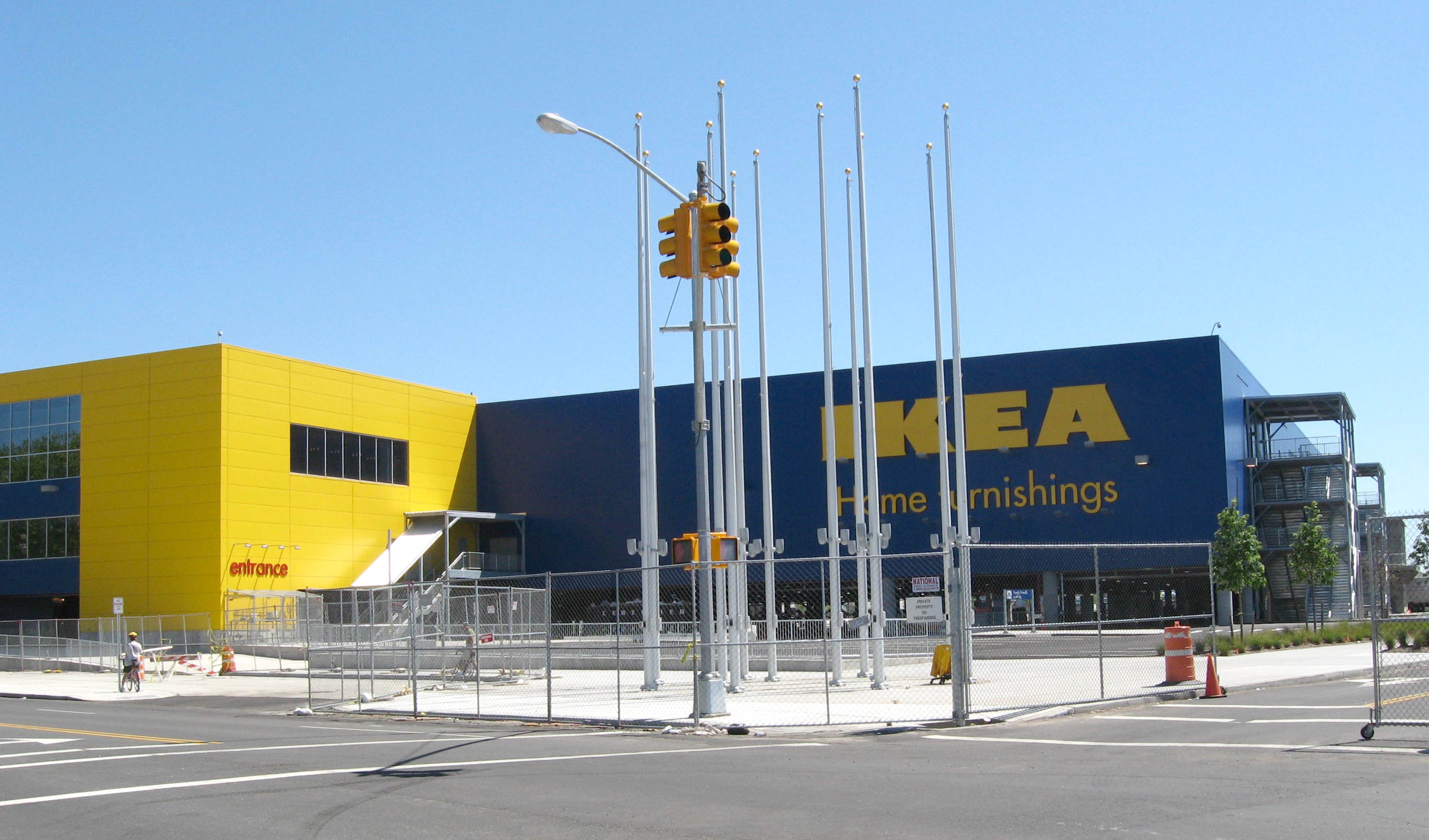
North side of the IKEA store before opening

Red Hook has a large IKEA store (346,000 square feet (32,100 m^{2})) that opened on June 18, 2008, near the Gowanus Expressway. The building of IKEA was controversial. Opponents cited concerns including traffic congestion, a decrease in property values and destruction of this transit-oriented neighborhood and historically significant buildings in the area. Brooklyn artist Greg Lindquist exhibited a group of paintings in February 2008 in New York City that depicted the IKEA site in process, juxtaposing the maritime decay with the new construction.

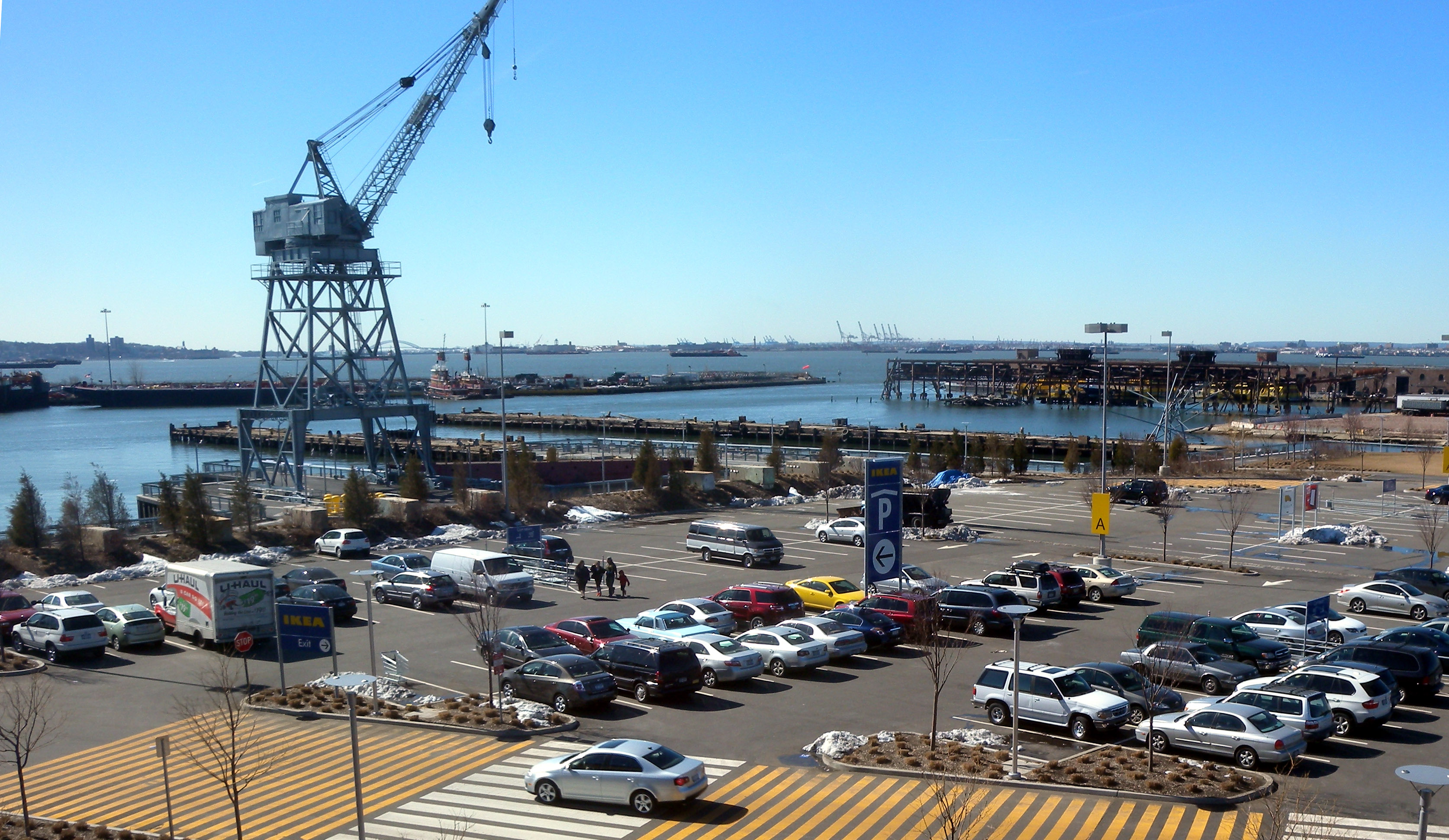
Former location of Todd Shipyard in Erie Basin. Ikea bought the property and paved over the Red Hook graving dock to make a parking lot.

As part of the IKEA development, a number of Civil War era buildings were demolished and the Red Hook graving dock, a 19th-century dry dock still in use, was filled in and leveled for use as a parking lot. A Maritime Support Services Location Study by the New York City Economic Development Corporation found that New York City needed eight more dry docks. According to the report, it would cost $1 billion to replace the one sold to IKEA, although no schedule for replacement was announced. In addition, IKEA's contractor was found to be in "violation for not having filed asbestos work, failing to monitor the air, not posting warnings, failure to construct decontamination protections before disturbing the asbestos-containing materials, and doing nothing to protect and decontaminate the material, as well as the workers and building waste."

== Demographics ==
Based on data from the 2010 United States census, the population of the Carroll Gardens/Columbia Street/Red Hook neighborhood tabulation area was 38,353, a change of 26 (0.1%) from the 38,327 counted in 2000. Covering an area of 1,040.71 acres (421.16 ha), the neighborhood had a population density of 36.9 inhabitants per acre (23,600/sq mi; 9,100/km^{2}).

The racial makeup of the Carroll Gardens/Columbia Street/Red Hook neighborhood tabulation area was 60.9% (23,342) White, 11.9% (4,573) African American, 0.2% (61) Native American, 4.5% (1,728) Asian, 0% (13) Pacific Islander, 0.4% (143) from other races, and 2.4% (912) from two or more races, and Hispanic or Latino of any race were 19.8% (7,581) of the population.

The majority of residents identified as either Black, Hispanic, or Latino during the late 20th century. As late as 2000, 43% of the neighborhood's population was Black, and nearly half identified as Hispanic of Latino. Between 2000 and 2016, the ratio of White residents increased by 320%. According to a 2016 U.S. Census estimate, Red Hook's population was 31% White and 35% Black; in addition, 44% of residents identified as Hispanic or Latino of any race.

== Police and crime ==
Red Hook is patrolled by the 76th Precinct of the NYPD, located at 191 Union Street. The 76th Precinct ranked 37th safest out of 69 patrol areas for per-capita crime in 2010. The 76th Precinct has a lower crime rate than in the 1990s, with crimes across all categories having decreased by 83.1% between 1990 and 2018. The precinct reported 4 murders, 9 rapes, 53 robberies, 91 felony assaults, 65 burglaries, 210 grand larcenies, and 28 grand larcenies auto in 2018.

== Fire safety ==
The New York City Fire Department (FDNY) operates two fire stations serving Red Hook:

- Engine Company 202/Ladder Company 101 – 31 Richards Street
- Engine Company 279/Ladder Company 131 – 252 Lorraine Street

== Education ==
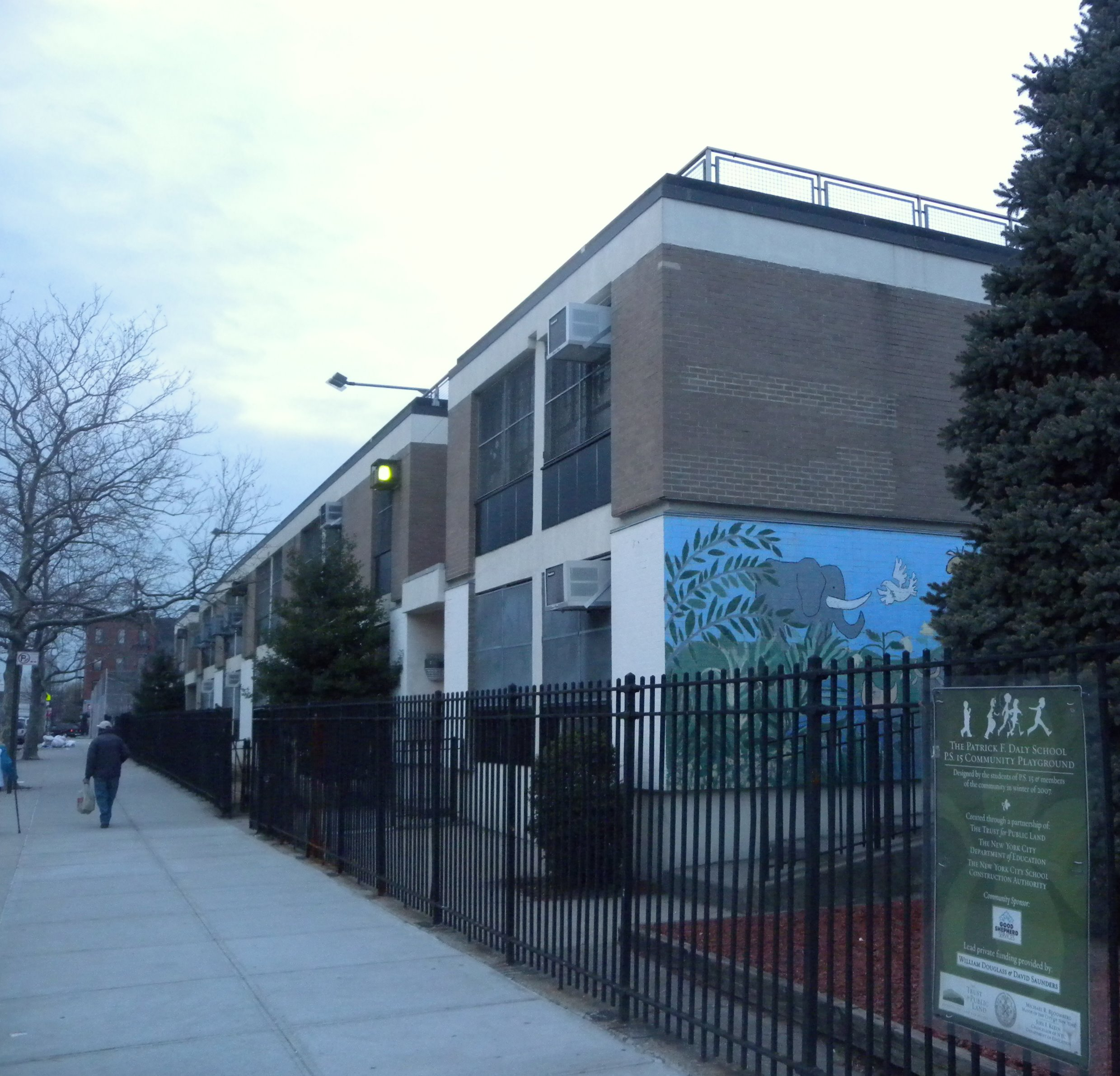
PS 15

=== Schools ===
Schools in Red Hook include:

- Pave Academy Charter School – Grades K–8
- P.S.15 Patrick F. Daly – Grades PK–5
- Summit Academy Charter School – Grades 6–12
- South Brooklyn Community High School – Grades 9–12
- Red Hook Neighborhood School – Grades PK–5
- Basis Independent Brooklyn – Grade K–12

=== Library ===
The Brooklyn Public Library's Red Hook branch is located at 7 Wolcott Street, near Dwight Street. The branch was originally housed in a Carnegie library structure, which was built in 1915 but burned down in a 1946 fire.

== Transportation ==
=== Water ===
Red Hook has been served by NYC Ferry's South Brooklyn route since 2017. NY Waterway operates a free ferry service between the IKEA store, Wall St/Pier 11, and Midtown/Pier 79 on weekends; the route was previously operated by New York Water Taxi and began operation in 2008 in conjunction with the store's opening.

The transatlantic liner RMS Queen Mary 2 docks in Red Hook. In spring 2006, a new Carnival Cruise Lines terminal, the Brooklyn Cruise Terminal, opened at Pier 12 at Pioneer Street, bringing additional tourists.

The Red Hook Container Terminal is one of four such facilities in the Port of New York and New Jersey and is the only maritime facility in Brooklyn to handle container ships.

Red Hook's commercial waterfront shapes the region's history
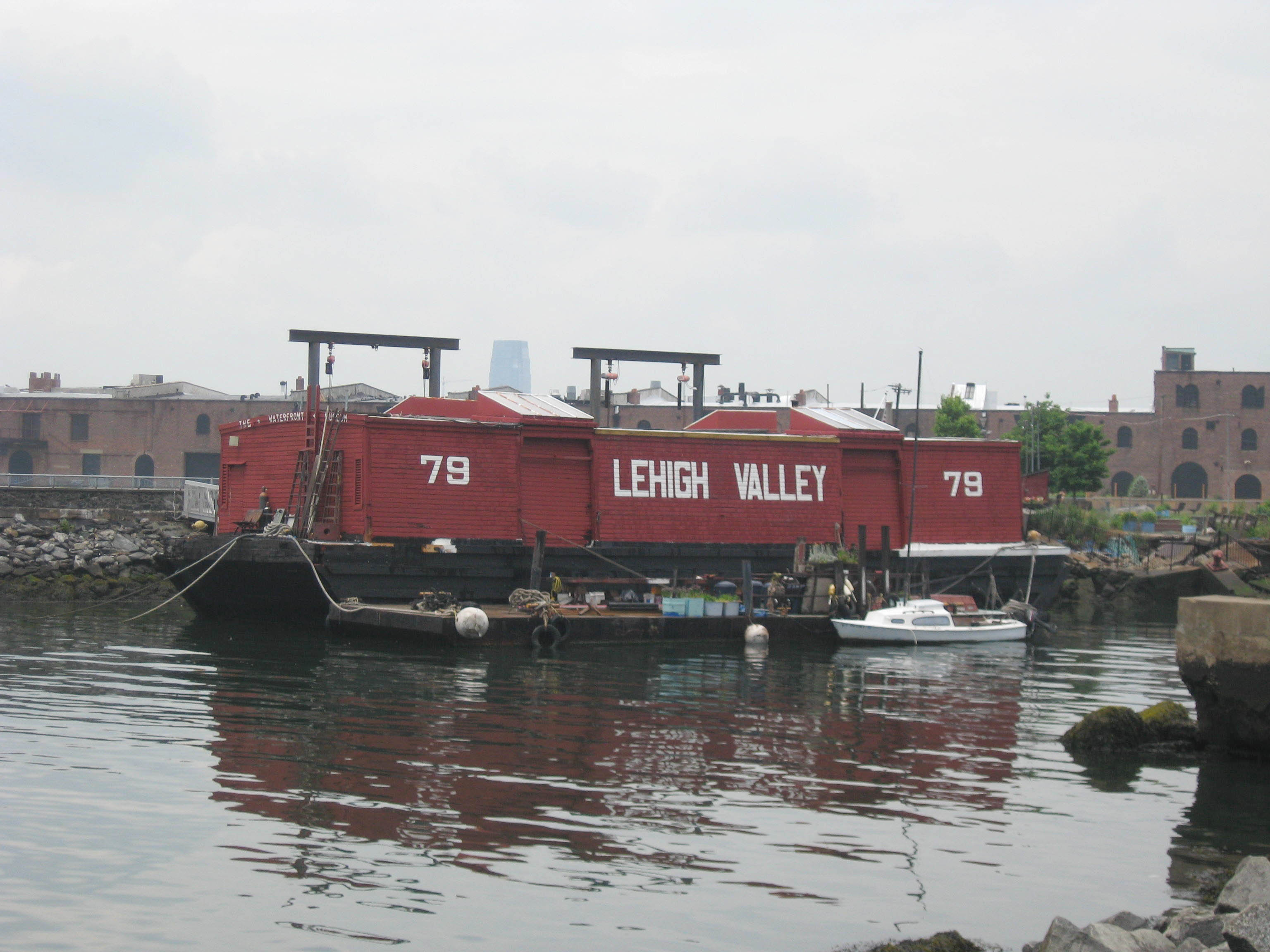
Lehigh Valley Railroad Barge Number 79 Waterfront Museum

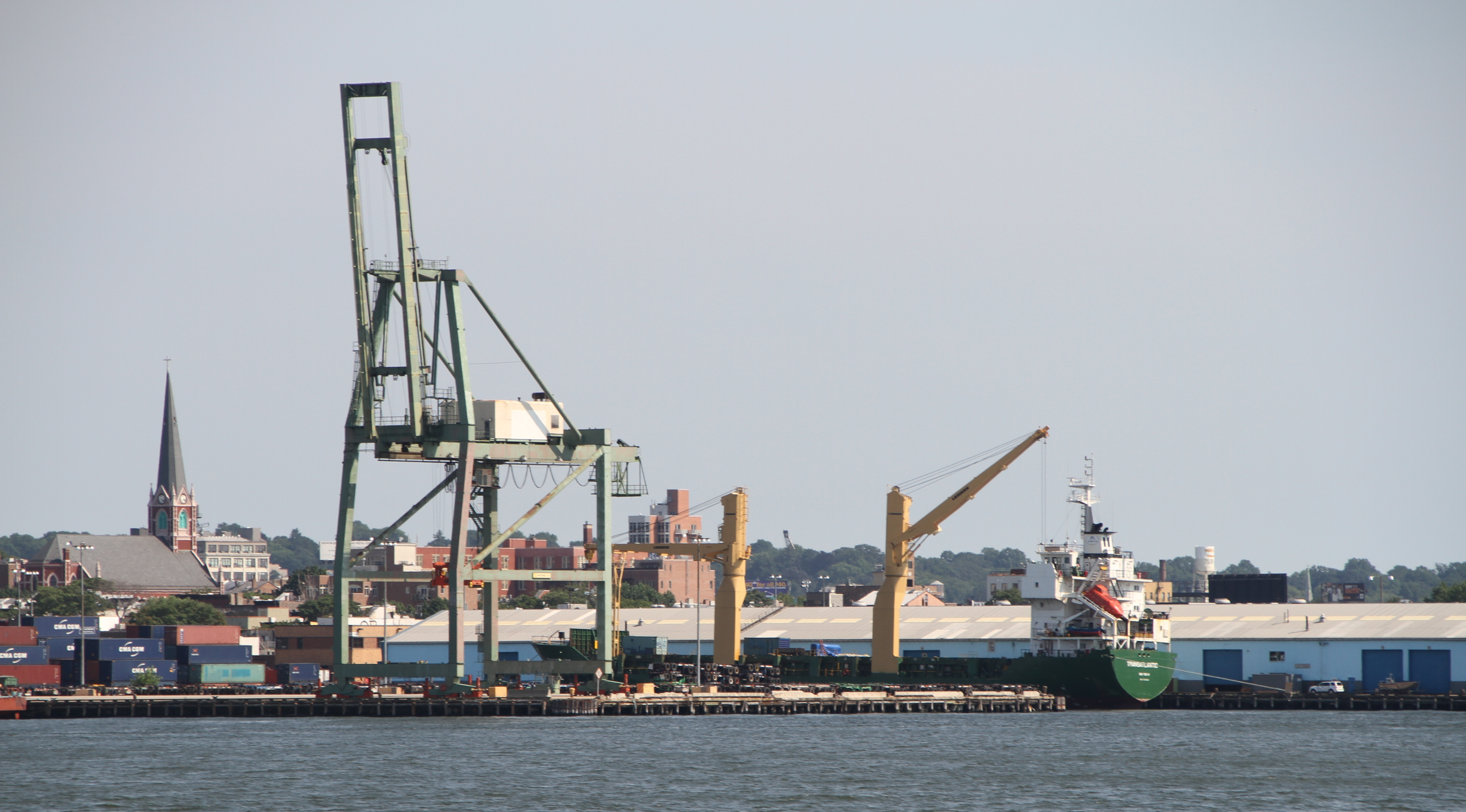
Red Hook Container Terminal

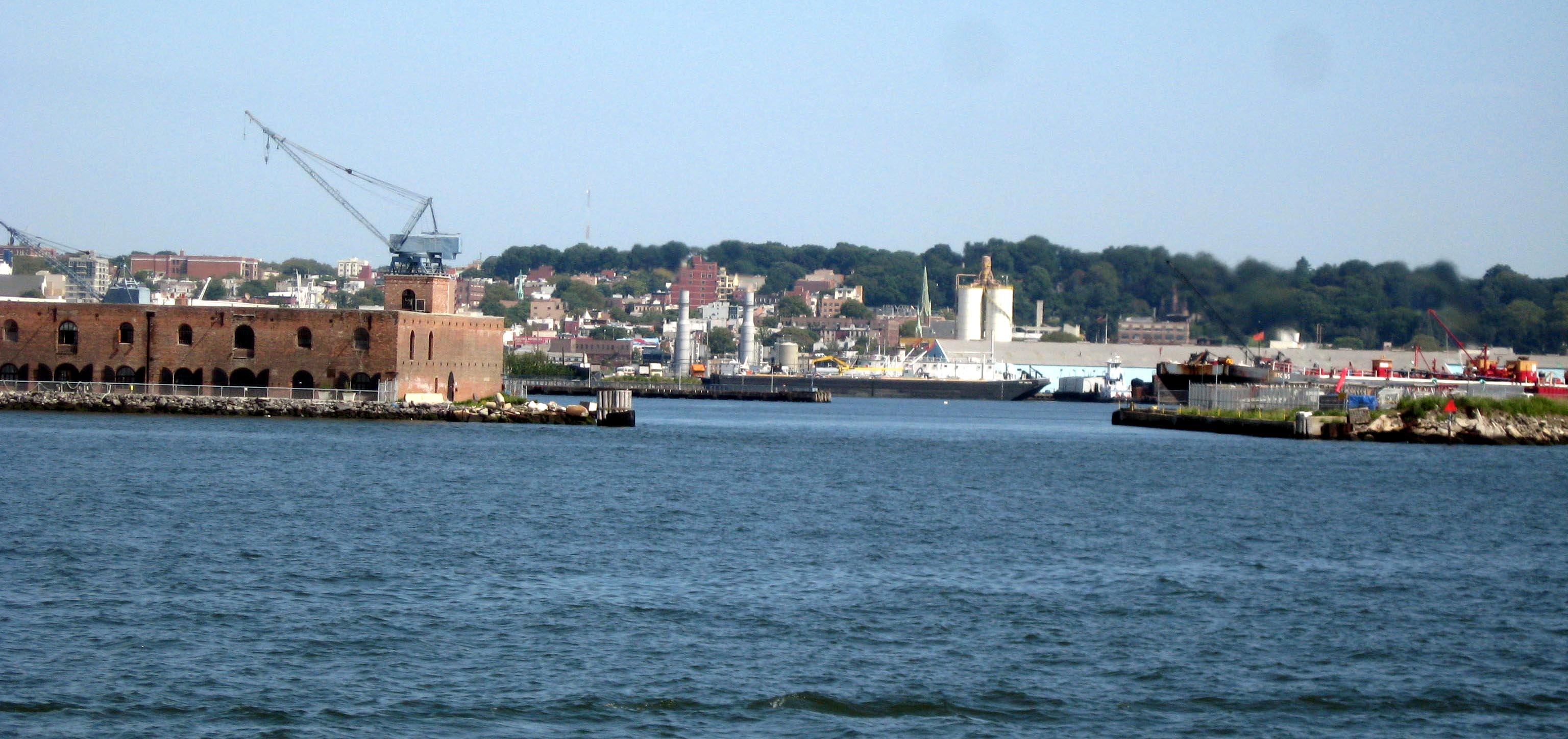
Erie Basin harbor constructed in the 1850s.

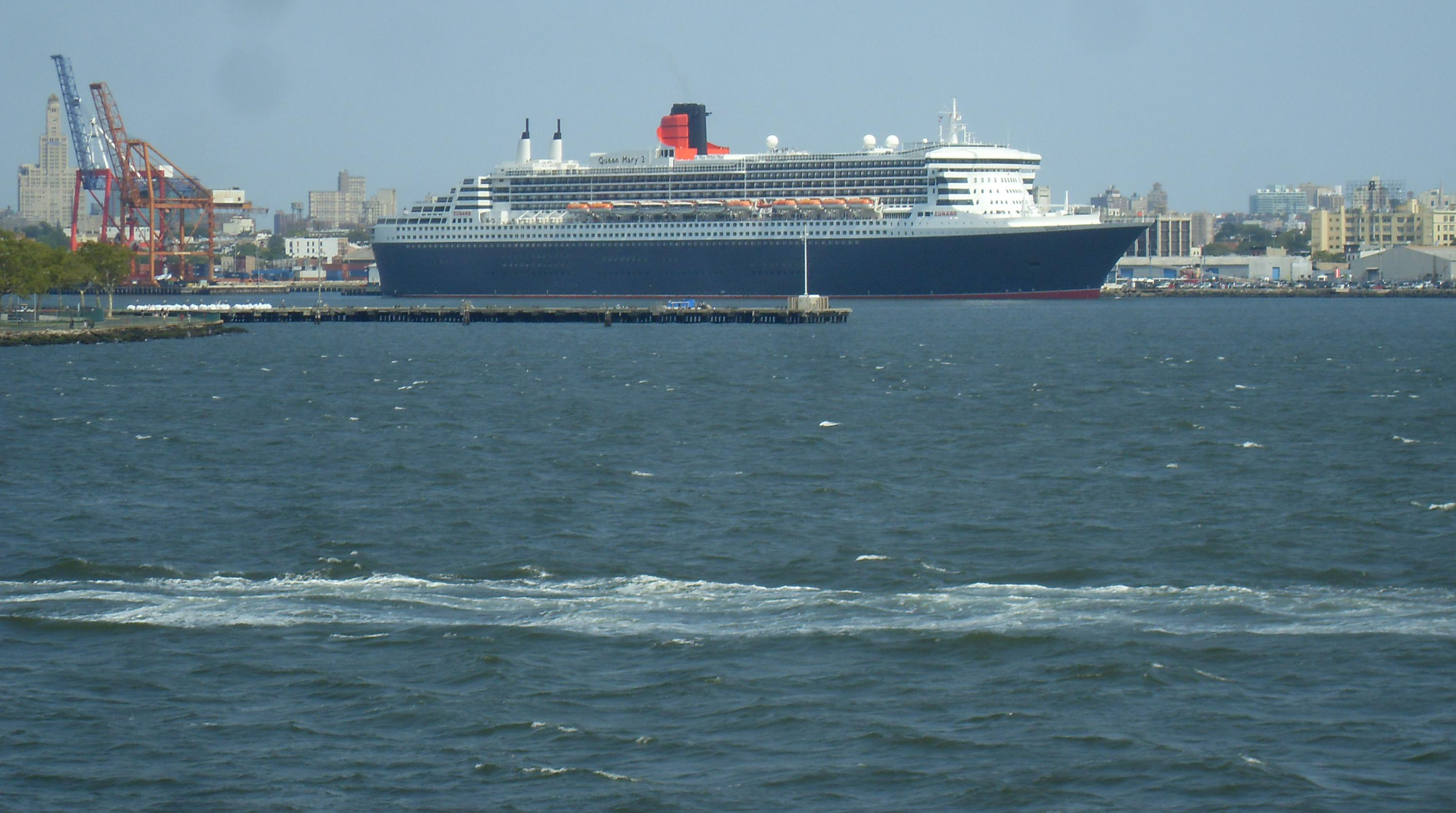
Queen Mary 2 docked at the Brooklyn Cruise Terminal

=== Public transport ===
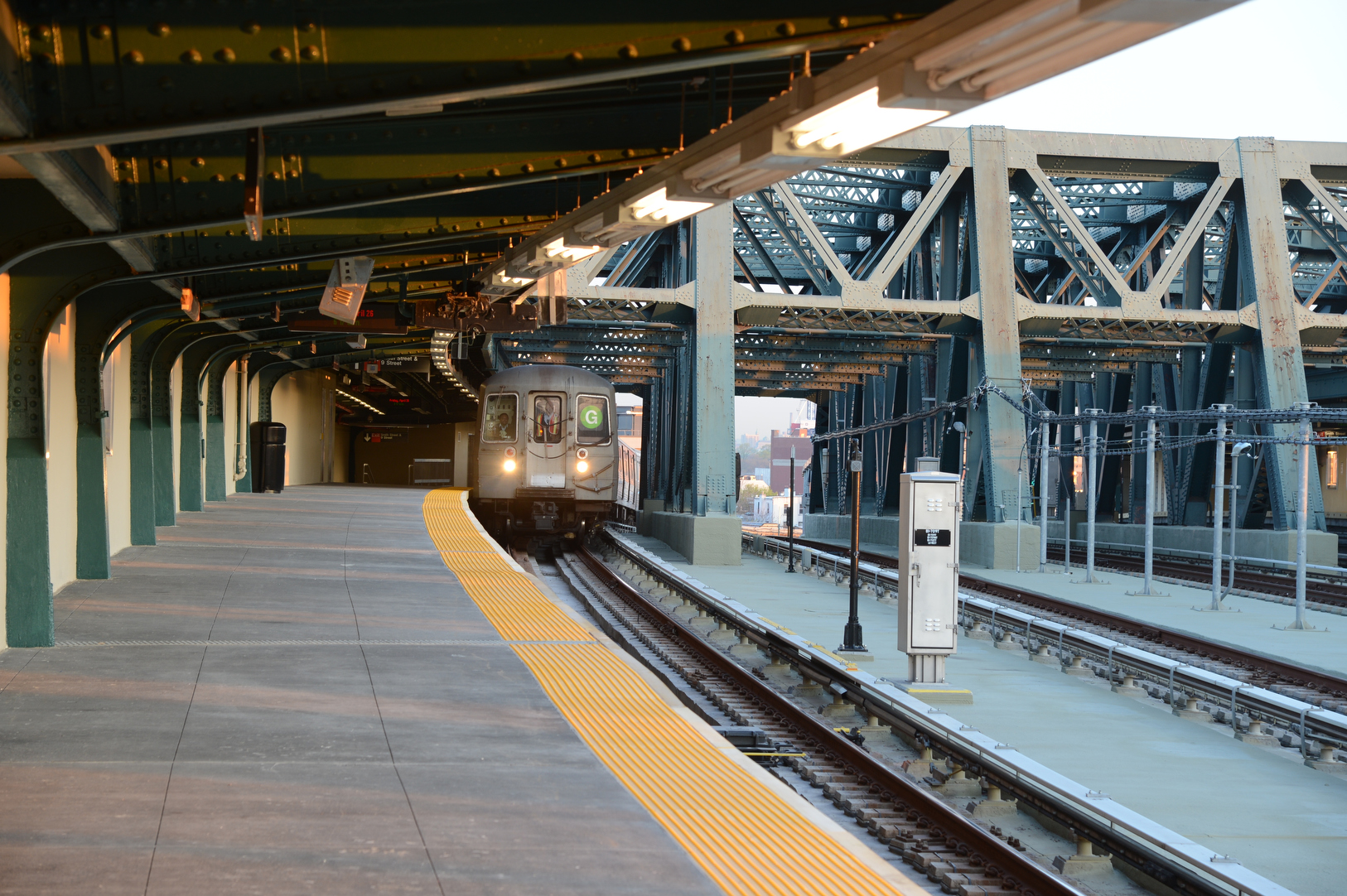
Smith–Ninth Streets station platform.

Subway service in the area is sparse. The closest subway stops are along the IND Culver Line (F and G trains), at either Carroll Street or Smith–Ninth Streets stations.

New York City Bus service is also sparse, but popular. The B61 bus route provides service from Hamilton Avenue, through Erie Basin/IKEA Plaza, to Van Brunt Street and then northward, through the Columbia Street Waterfront District and terminates in Downtown Brooklyn. It also connects with the Culver Line's Smith–Ninth Streets station. The B57 bus connects Red Hook with Downtown Brooklyn and Maspeth, Queens.

New York Water Taxi began operating a ferry route to the IKEA store in Red Hook when the store opened in 2008; the free service was implemented as a measure to improve transportation access to the new store but was not limited to use by store customers. The overall demand for the ferry by shoppers and non-shoppers was so high that the following year a $5 fare was charged for the service on weekdays, except for passengers that spent more than $10 in the store. Ferry service on weekends remained free of charge. The ferry service was taken over by NY Waterway in 2021 and remains free, but now only operates on weekends.

==== Streetcar project ====
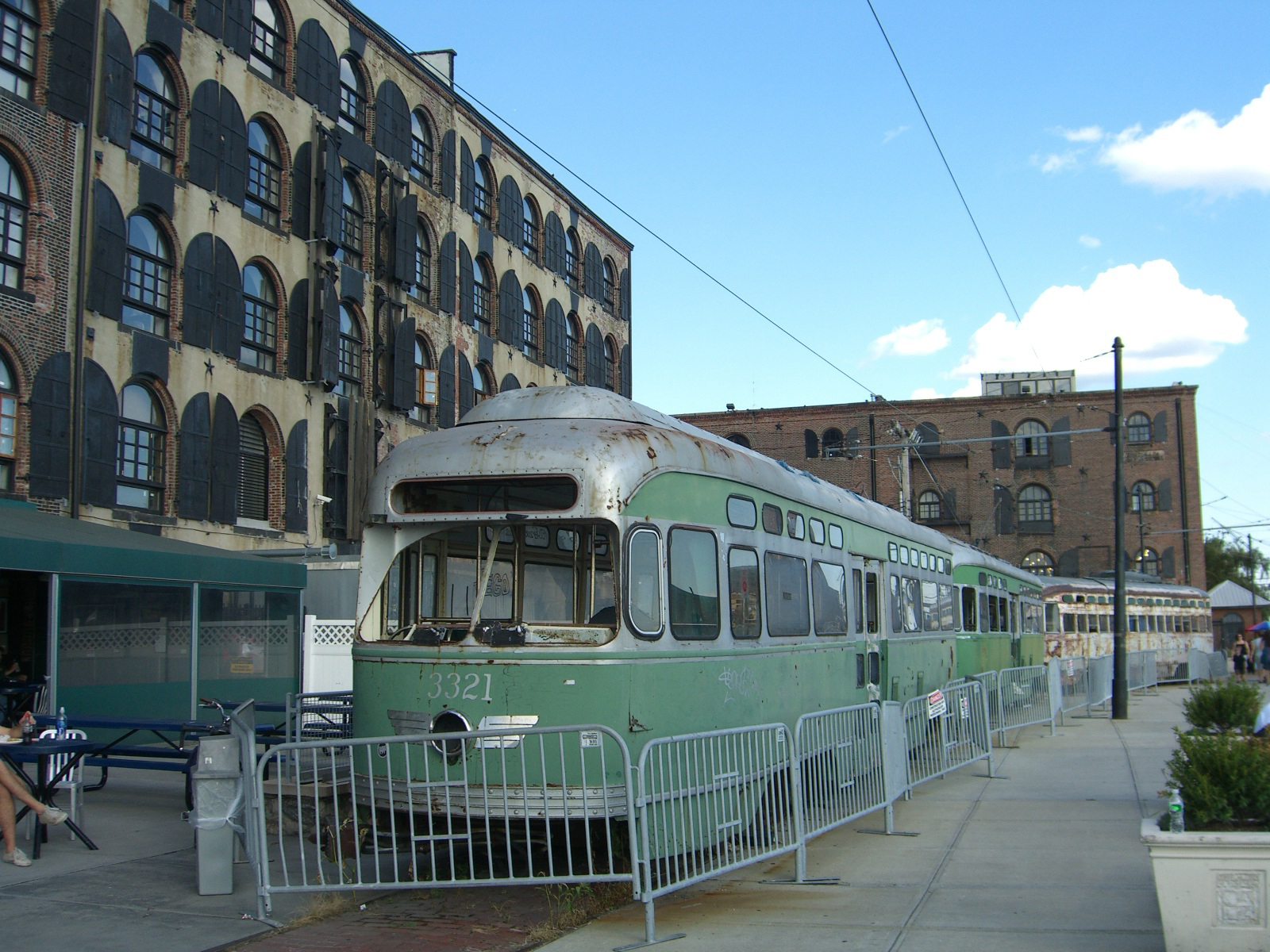
Old, out-of-service streetcars behind a Fairway Market (later become Food Bazaar) in Red Hook.

Although electric trolleys have not run in Brooklyn since 1956, activists led by the Brooklyn Historic Railway Association (BHRA) have been trying to revive streetcars in Red Hook since 1989. With permission from New York City's government to develop a streetcar line running from Beard Street to Borough Hall, in the 1990s BHRA president Robert Diamond collected disused PCC streetcars that had been used in Boston and Buffalo for potential use on the new line. By 1999, Diamond had begun laying new track for the project, but in 2003 transportation officials elected to revoke Diamond's rights to the route's right of way, instead intending to sell them to the highest bidder in the event that the project ever moved forward. Diamond's efforts to secure independent funding were not successful.

In 2005, Rep. Nydia Velázquez helped obtain a $300,000 federal grant for a six-month streetcar study. Although BHRA had estimated $10–$15 million would be required to complete the project, the New York City Department of Transportation (NYCDOT) streetcar feasibility study (completed in April 2011) concluded that the 6.8 miles (10.9 km) line would cost $176 million in capital funding, plus an additional $6.2 to $7.2 million in annual operating funds. A significant portion of the capital cost would be required to make modifications to Red Hook's narrow streets in order to allow streetcars to make right turns. The study ultimately found that the streetcar was not feasible because of high costs, potentially low ridership, and physical constraints like narrow streets.

In January 2016, a new proposal for a streetcar line in Red Hook, called the Brooklyn–Queens Connector, was made public by a non-profit group named Friends of the Brooklyn Queens Connector. The study proposed a 17-mile (27 km) route between the neighborhoods of Astoria in Queens and Sunset Park in Brooklyn, passing through several neighborhoods on the way, including Red Hook. The private results of the study estimated that the streetcar's construction would cost $1.7 billion and would serve 15.8 million annual riders by 2035. In February 2016, the office of Mayor Bill de Blasio announced that the city would begin planning work for the streetcar line. However, although a list of possible routings for the streetcar was released in November 2016, there was insufficient funding to start construction. By August 2018, the southern terminal of the proposed streetcar had been truncated to Red Hook and the proposed cost rose to $2.73 billion, with projected completion postponed to 2029.

=== Vehicular ===
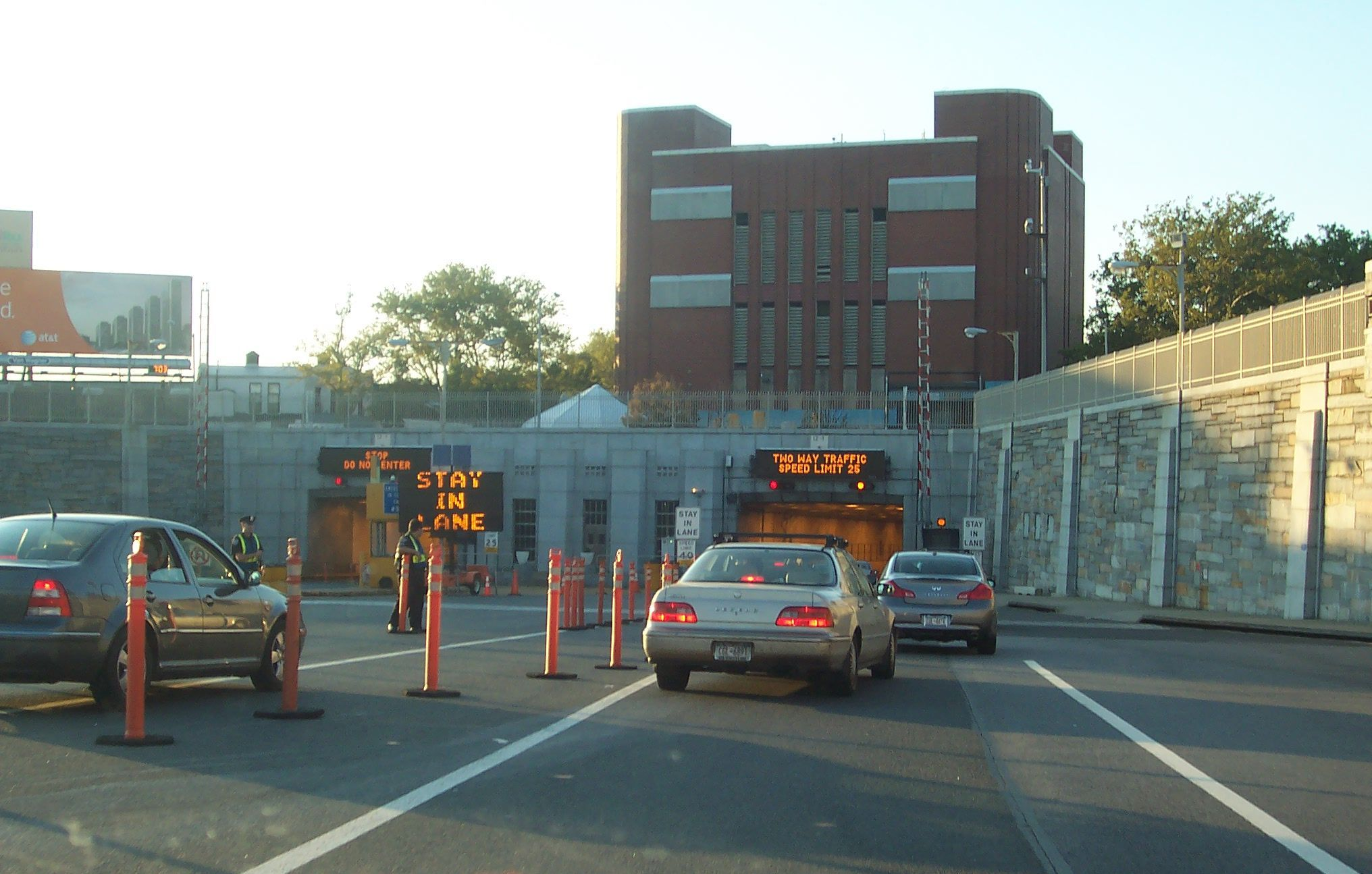
The Red Hook portal of the Brooklyn–Battery Tunnel

Red Hook is connected to Manhattan by the Brooklyn–Battery Tunnel, whose approaches separate it from Carroll Gardens and Columbia Street to the north. The tunnel's toll plaza was formerly located in Red Hook but was removed in 2017, replaced by electronic toll collection gantries on the Manhattan side of the tunnel.

The Gowanus Expressway (Interstate 278) also runs through the neighborhood.

== Events ==
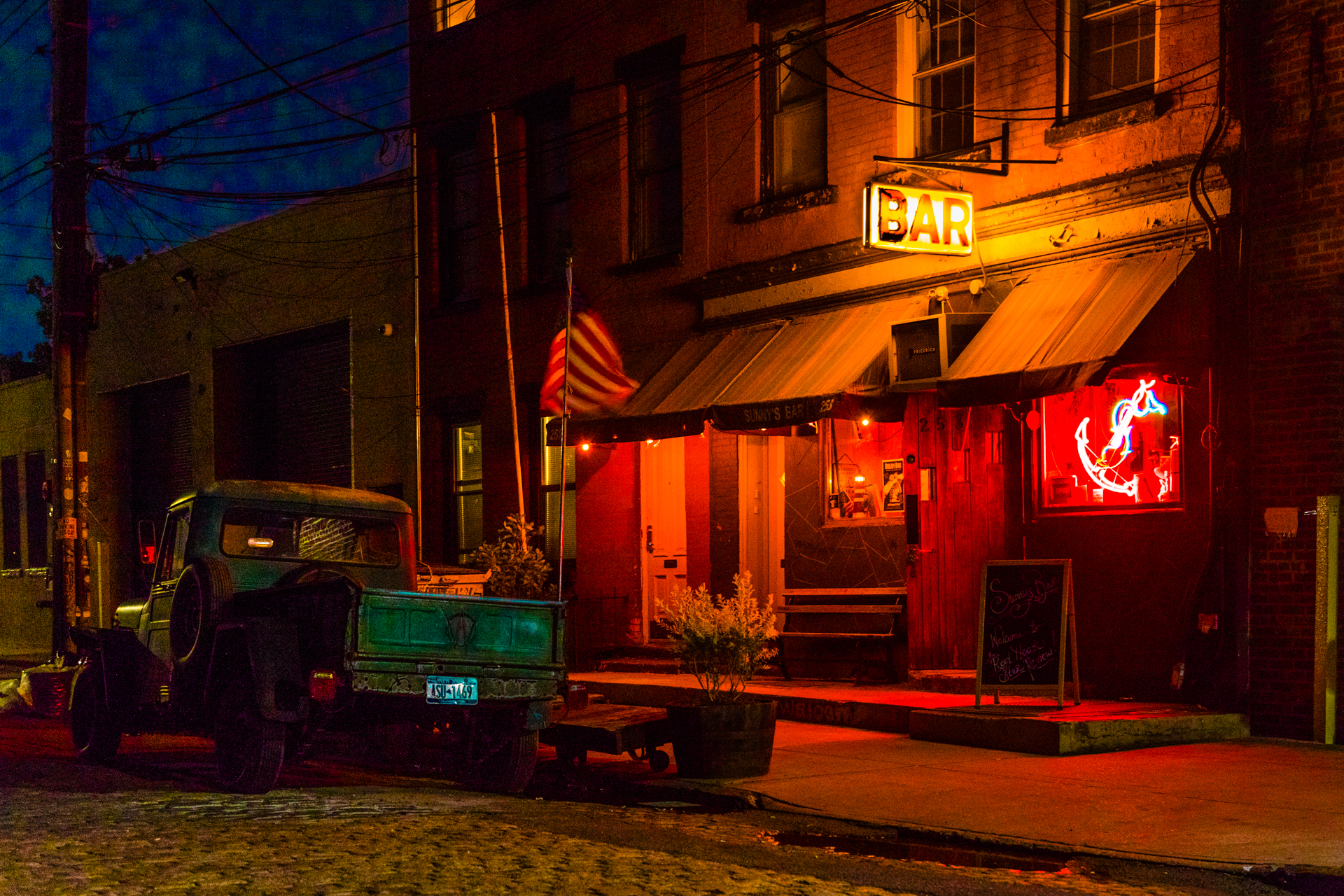
Sunny's Bar

The Red Hook Waterfront Arts Festival is an annual summer kick-off held in Louis J. Valentino Jr. Park & Pier featuring dance, music, and spoken-word poetry. Dance Theatre Etcetera, the producers of the event, concentrate local resources for residents and bring in community partners with activities for the whole family.

Sundays at Sunny's is a reading series held the first Sunday of every month, co-sponsored by Sunny's Bar and the independent bookstore BookCourt, and co-ordinated by writer Gabriel Cohen.

Red Hook Crit is an annual, unsanctioned bicycle race held on a springtime night on track bikes. It began as an underground event but has grown to become "what is possibly the country's coolest bike race."

The Brooklyn Street Circuit is located in Red Hook and hosts the annual New York City ePrix.

== Notable residents ==
- Carmelo Anthony (born 1984), former NBA player
- Jaimie Branch (1983–2022), jazz trumpeter
- Al Capone (1899–1947), gangster
- Joe Gallo (1929–1972), who was commemorated in Bob Dylan's song "Joey" from the album Desire.
- Albert Gallo, mobster and brother of Joe Gallo
- Stephen Kunken (born c. 1971), actor
- Michael Lerner (1941–2023), actor
- James McBride, writer
- Christian Moore (born 2002), baseball player
- Greg O'Connell (1942–2025), property developer
- Sarah Rapelje, for whose family Brooklyn's Rapelye Street is named
- Hell Razah, rapper, member of hip-hop group Sunz of Man
- Matty Rich, director of movies Straight Out of Brooklyn and The Inkwell
- Shabazz the Disciple, rapper, member of hip-hop group Sunz of Man
- Michael Shannon (born 1974), actor
- Peter Steele (1962–2010), member of Type O Negative
- Taz (born 1967 as Peter Senerchia), former professional wrestler and color commentator
- Eli Wallach (1915–2014), actor
- Michelle Williams (born 1980), actress
- Dustin Yellin (born 1975), artist

== In popular culture ==
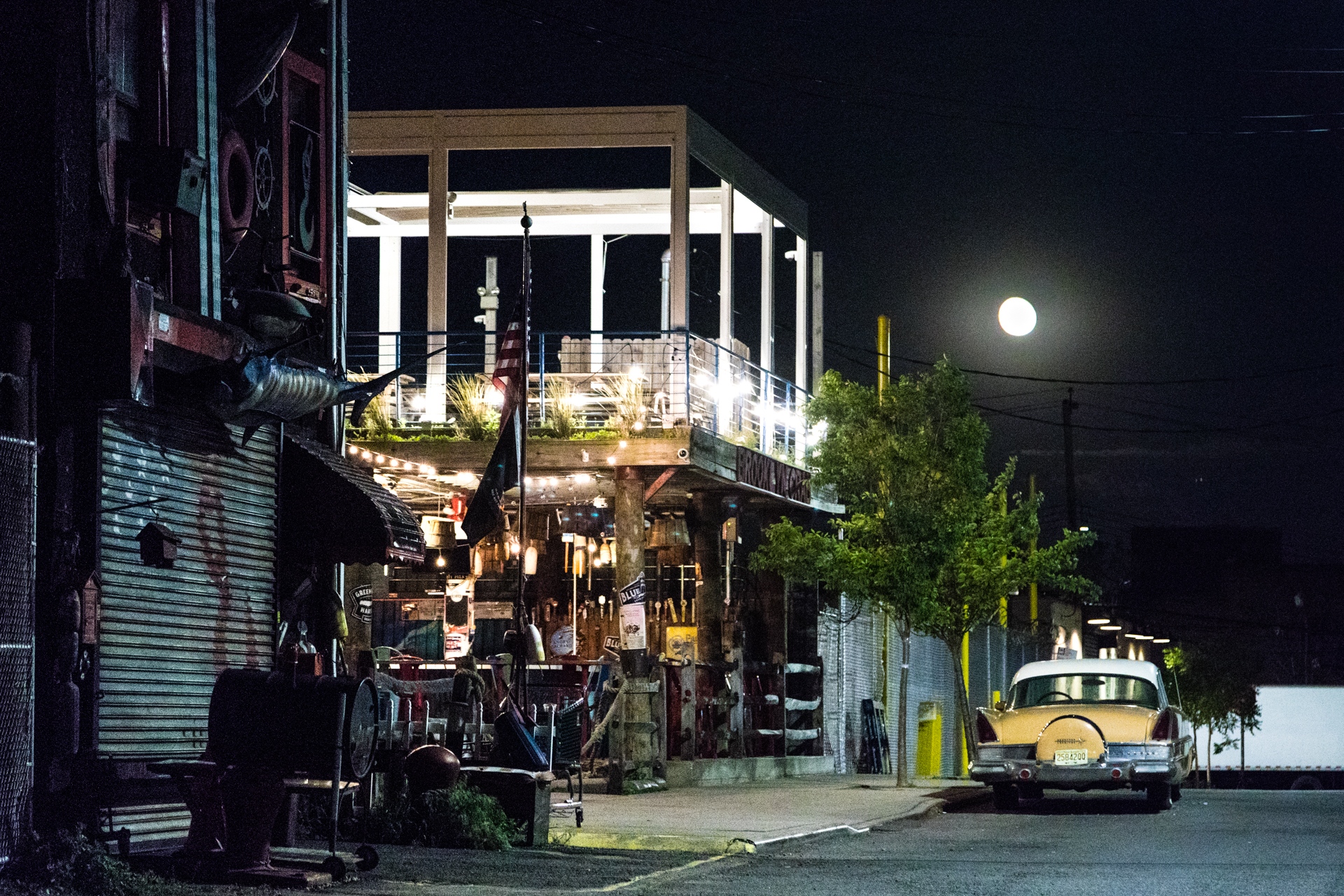
Brooklyn Crab on a spring night

- Red Hook was the setting for the H. P. Lovecraft 1927 story "The Horror at Red Hook".
- The area was used as the setting for Arthur Miller's 1955 play A View from the Bridge, and subsequently for the opera of the same name by William Bolcom.
- In the 1988 film Spike of Bensonhurst, the protagonist moves from Bensonhurst to Red Hook after being chased out of his old neighborhood by the Mafia.
- Red Hook was the setting for the 1964 novel Last Exit to Brooklyn by Hubert Selby Jr. and the 1989 film of the same name.
- Pier 41 at 204 Van Dyke Street was used as the setting of a bar scene in the 2005 Will Smith film Hitch.
- The cast of The Real World: Brooklyn, part of MTV's reality television series The Real World, resided at Pier 41 in 2009.
- "The Red Hook" is the name of a cocktail created at Milk & Honey.
