= Sunny's Bar =

Historic bar in Red Hook, Brooklyn

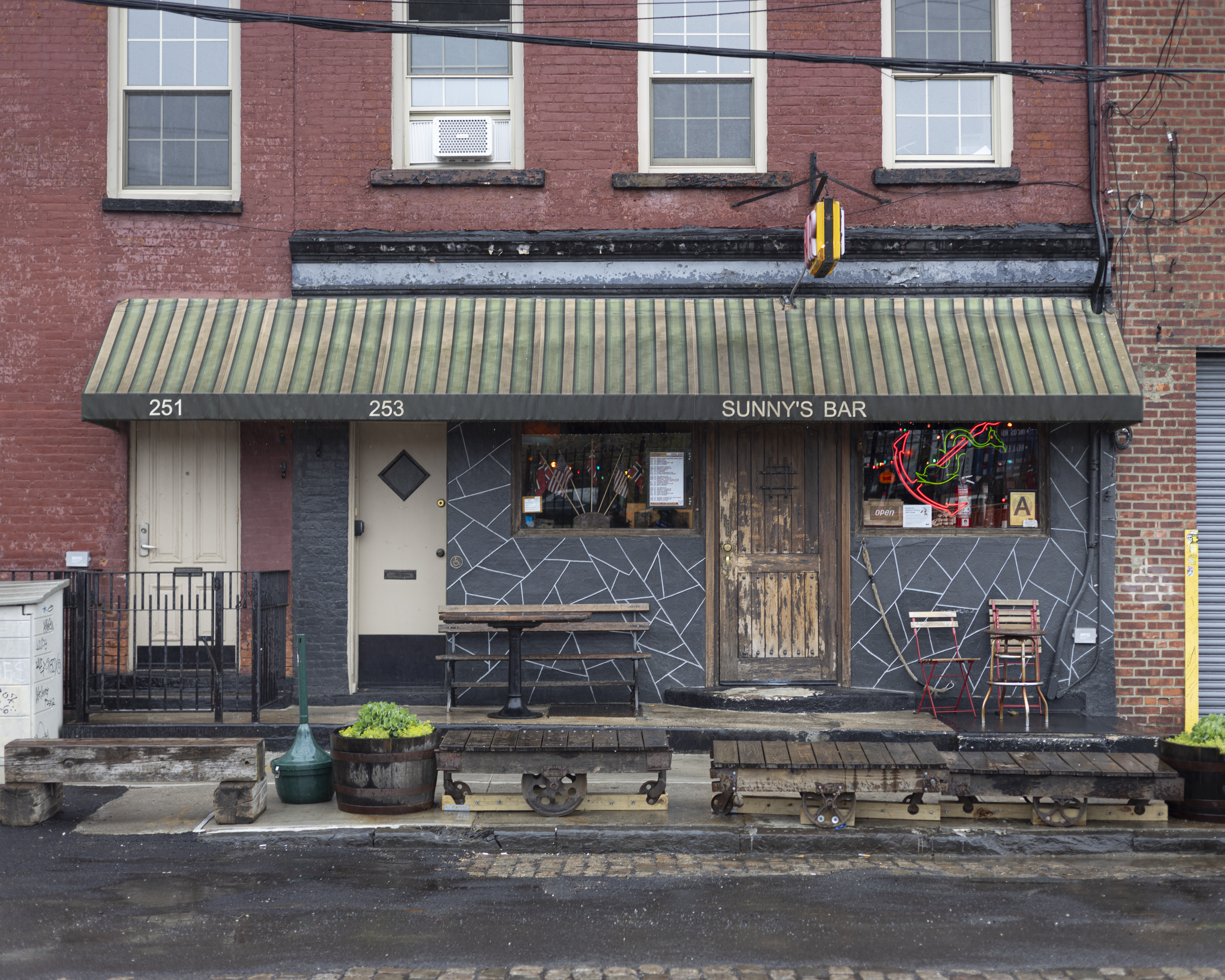
- Interactive map of Sunny's Bar

Restaurant information
- Established: 1890
- Owner: Tone Balzano Johansen
- Location: 253 Conover St, New York City, Brooklyn, New York, United States
- Coordinates: 40°40′33″N 74°01′01″W
- Website: www.sunnysredhook.com

Sunny's Bar (often referred to as "Sunny's") is a historic bar in the Red Hook neighborhood of Brooklyn, New York City. Founded in 1890, it became a cultural hub under owner Antonio "Sunny" Balzano in the 1990s, and is known for live music and community gatherings. After closing due to damage from Hurricane Sandy in 2012, the bar reopened in 2013 and currently operates under Balzano's widow, Tone Balzano Johansen.

== History ==
The business dates to 1890, when it opened in Red Hook as John’s Bar and Restaurant, serving sailors, stevedores, and other waterfront workers. It remained in the Balzano family for decades; Antonio “Sunny” Balzano was born and raised in the adjacent upstairs apartment.

As cargo operations left Red Hook in the late 20th century, the daytime bar drew fewer longshoremen and a growing number of artists and other newcomers; by the 1980s and early 1990s, it had become a meeting place for both long-time residents and recent arrivals.

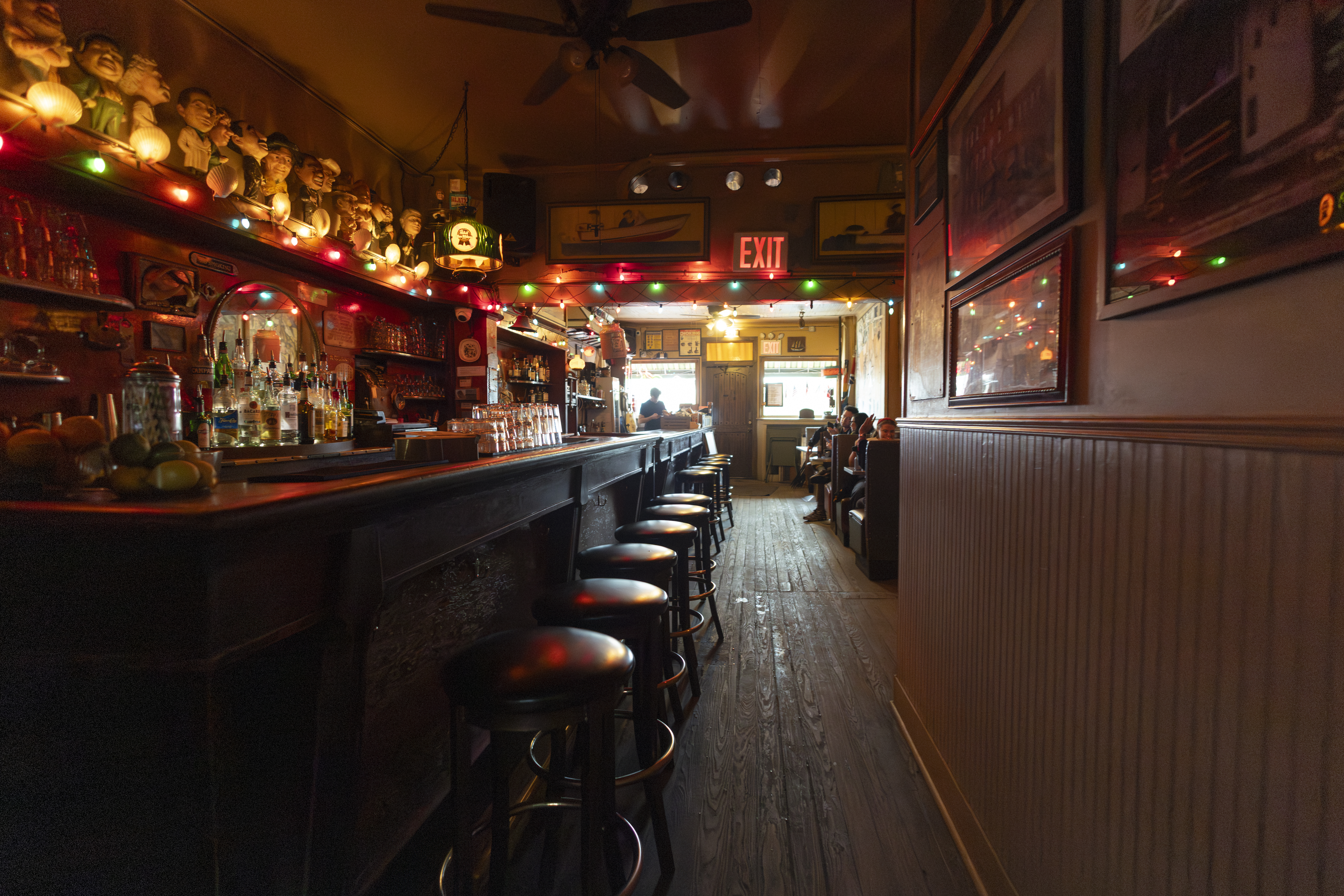
Interior of Sunny’s Bar

After the death of his uncle in 1994, Balzano assumed control and limited hours to occasional nights, encouraging performances and informal gatherings. In the later 1990s the bar operated as the "Red Hook Yacht and Kayak Club," in which patrons marked their own tabs and paid roughly $3 per drink as a "donation". In 2001 authorities required the business to close over licensing issues; it obtained a new liquor license and formally reopened in 2002.

The bar sustained extensive flooding and structural damage during Hurricane Sandy in October 2012, leading to a lengthy closure and fundraising to repair the building. It reopened in September 2013.

Balzano died in 2016 at age 81. Following a legal and community fundraising effort to keep the property from being sold, his widow, Tone Balzano Johansen, secured control of the building in 2017, and the bar remained open.

== Operations and features ==
Sunny's hosts frequent live music in its back room, including bluegrass, folk, and jazz sessions. The bar has been noted for a weekly bluegrass jam associated with owner Tone Balzano Johansen and for its role as a gathering place for artists and neighbors.

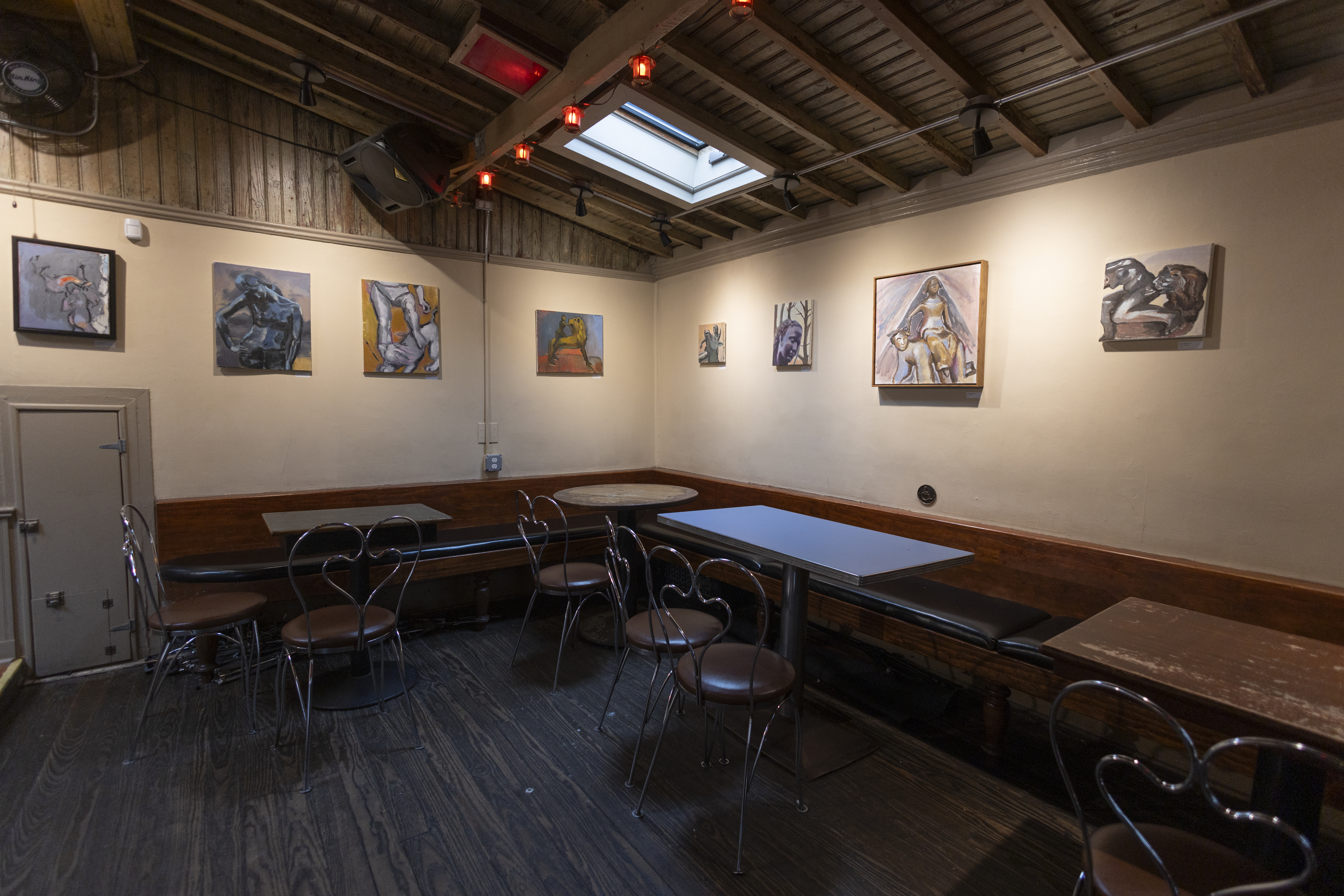
The back room of Sunny's Bar

Food and drinks are limited and unelaborate, with coverage emphasizing the bar's memorabilia-filled interior, cash-only service, and informal atmosphere.

== Reception ==
New York Magazine includes Sunny's in its citywide bar guide, describing it as a "century-old" Red Hook mainstay and assigning it a high editors' score. Condé Nast Traveler lists Sunny's among the best Brooklyn venues for live music.

== In popular culture ==
Writer Tim Sultan's memoir Sunny's Nights: Lost and Found at a Bar on the Edge of the World portrays the bar and its community.

In 2023, media reported a documentary project about the bar by filmmaker Nick Fitzhugh.

In 2024, The New Yorker covered "The Wind and the Rain," a play set at Sunny's during Hurricane Sandy, staged on a nearby barge.
