= Brooklyn Cruise Terminal =

Cruise terminal in New York, United States

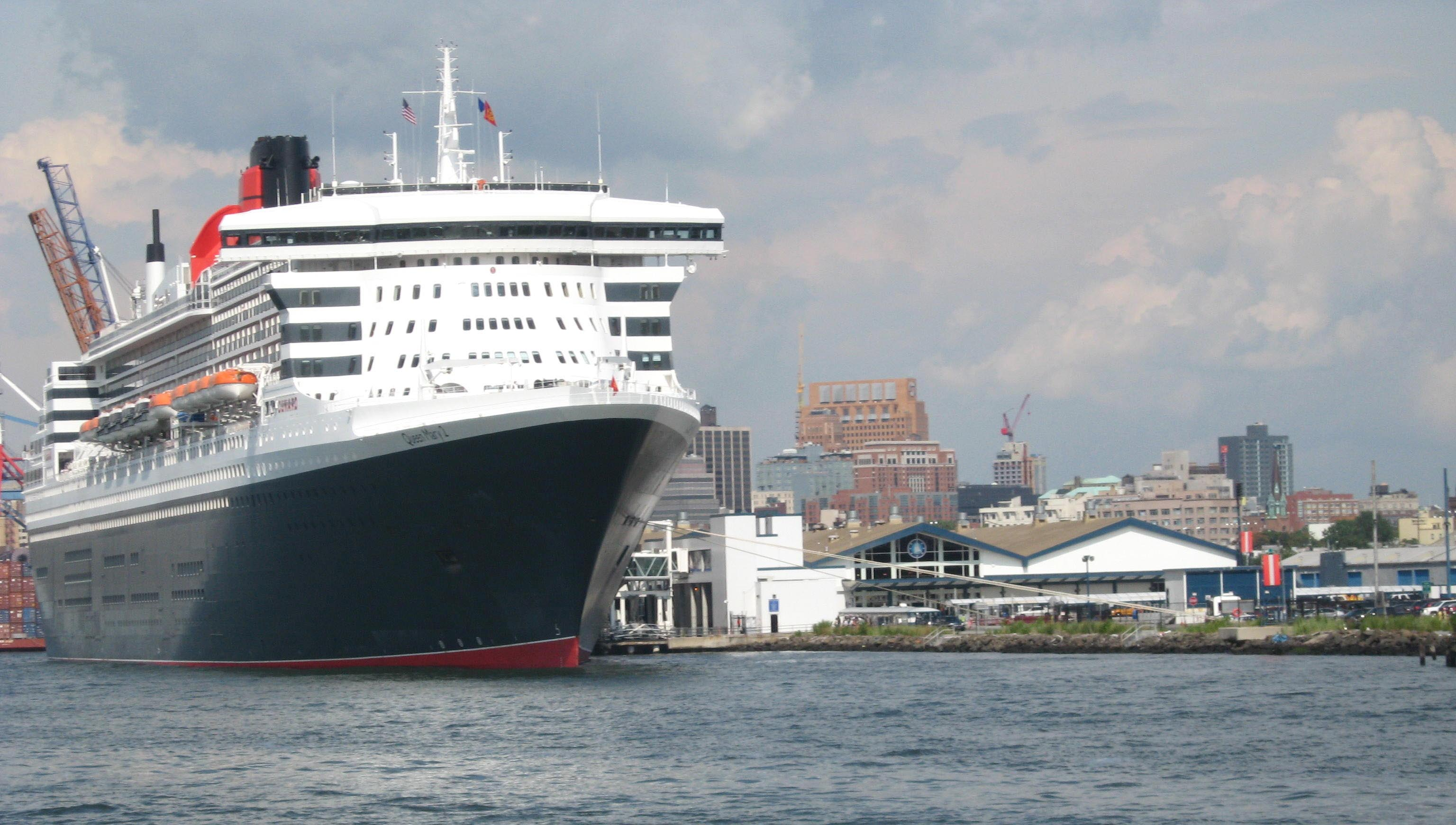
- The Queen Mary 2 at the terminal

General information
- Location: Pier 12; 210 Clinton Wharf; Brooklyn, NY; United States
- Coordinates: 40°40.92′0″N 74°0.86′0″W
- Owner: City of New York
- Operator: Ports America
- Connections: NYC Ferry: South Brooklyn Route; MTA New York City Bus: B61

Construction
- Structure type: Pier
- Parking: Yes
- Accessible: Yes

Other information
- Website: cruise.nyc/brooklyn-terminal

History
- Opened: April 2006
Location

The Brooklyn Cruise Terminal is a cruise terminal in the Red Hook neighborhood of Brooklyn, New York City. The terminal is 180,000 square feet (17,000 m^{2}) and sits on Buttermilk Channel, a tidal strait separating Brooklyn from Governors Island. It is owned by the City of New York and operated by Ports America. The terminal is one of three terminals for ocean-going cruise ships in the New York metropolitan area. Ships from Carnival Corporation (which owns the Cunard and Princess Cruises) call the terminal their home port.

The Brooklyn Cruise Terminal is located at Red Hook Pier 12, on the south side of the Atlantic Basin at Pioneer and Imlay Streets. Vehicular access is through the main gate near the intersection of Bowne and Imlay Streets.

The cruise terminal also features an events center which opened along with the terminal which has been used for trade shows, concerts, and conventions.

The terminal was converted from a 1954 freight terminal and was earlier the site of the Atlantic Basin Iron Works. The Brooklyn Cruise Terminal opened on April 15, 2006, following a $52 million investment by NYCEDC, with the arrival of the RMS Queen Mary 2. On July 15 and 16, 2017, the Brooklyn Street Circuit in the port and supporting roads hosted the Formula E electric car racing series' ninth and tenth round in the 2016–17 Formula E season.

From 2023 to 2026, Brooklyn Cruise Terminal was the home port of the MSC Meraviglia.

== See also ==
- Port of New York and New Jersey
- Manhattan Cruise Terminal
- Cape Liberty Cruise Port
