= Atlantic Basin Iron Works =

Former ship facility in Brooklyn

Coordinates: 40.68263°N 74.01186°W

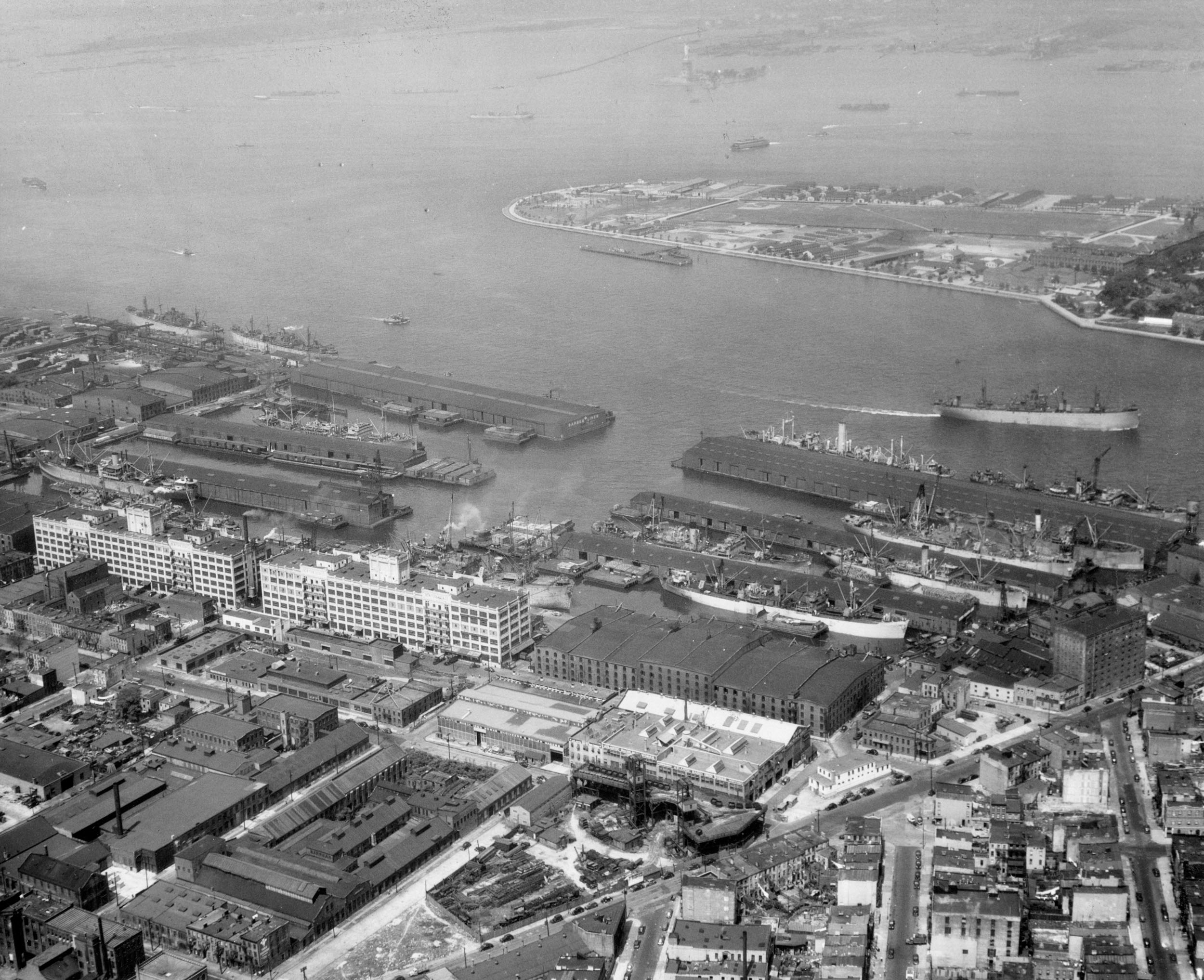
Aerial view of the yard in 1945, Governors Island in the background

The Atlantic Basin Iron Works was a ship repair and conversion facility that operated in Brooklyn, New York, from the late 19th to the mid-20th century. It converted numerous ships to military use in World War II.

Founded before 1910, the yard had its headquarters at 18–20 Summit Street. By 1920, the yard was known for its construction and repair of oil-fired boilers, diesel engines, and refrigeration units.

In World War II the company specialized in ship conversion and repair, and like most US shipyards at the time, it was heavily contracted for work by the United States Army, United States Navy and United States Maritime Commission.

In 1941–42 the company converted the 9,300-ton passenger and cargo steamship Rio Parana into the British Royal Navy escort carrier HMS Biter.

The company's owner, Bernard A. Moran, was strongly anti-union and had defied attempts by the CIO's Marine and Shipbuilding Workers Union to secure a contract with the company since November 1938. His approach became problematic in the war after President Franklin D. Roosevelt's War Labor Board ordered Moran under its broad war powers to sign a union security (maintenance-of-membership) contract. In spite of warnings that he might lose all his government contracts or have his company seized, Moran remained intransigent, and after three months of legal wrangling, the government made good on its threat and seized the company in September 1943, taking direct control of its management.

In 1947–48 the shipyard converted the 20,614-gross register ton (GRT) troopship USAT Brazil back into the Moore-McCormack Lines ocean liner SS Brazil. It was the largest peacetime conversion the yard had yet undertaken, and cost $9 million.

The western part of the site was used later for the Brooklyn Cruise Terminal, which opened in April 2006.
