= Red Hook Houses =

Public housing development in Brooklyn, New York

- NYCHA property
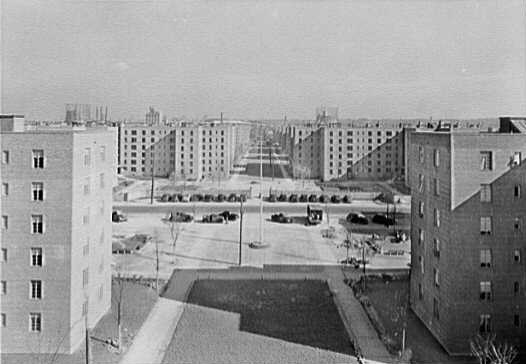
- Red Hook Houses in 1939
- Location within New York City
- Coordinates: 40.675838°N 74.004608°W
- Country: United States
- State: New York
- City: New York City
- Borough: Brooklyn
- Construction finished: 1939
- ZIP codes: 11231
- Area codes: 718, 347, 929, and 917

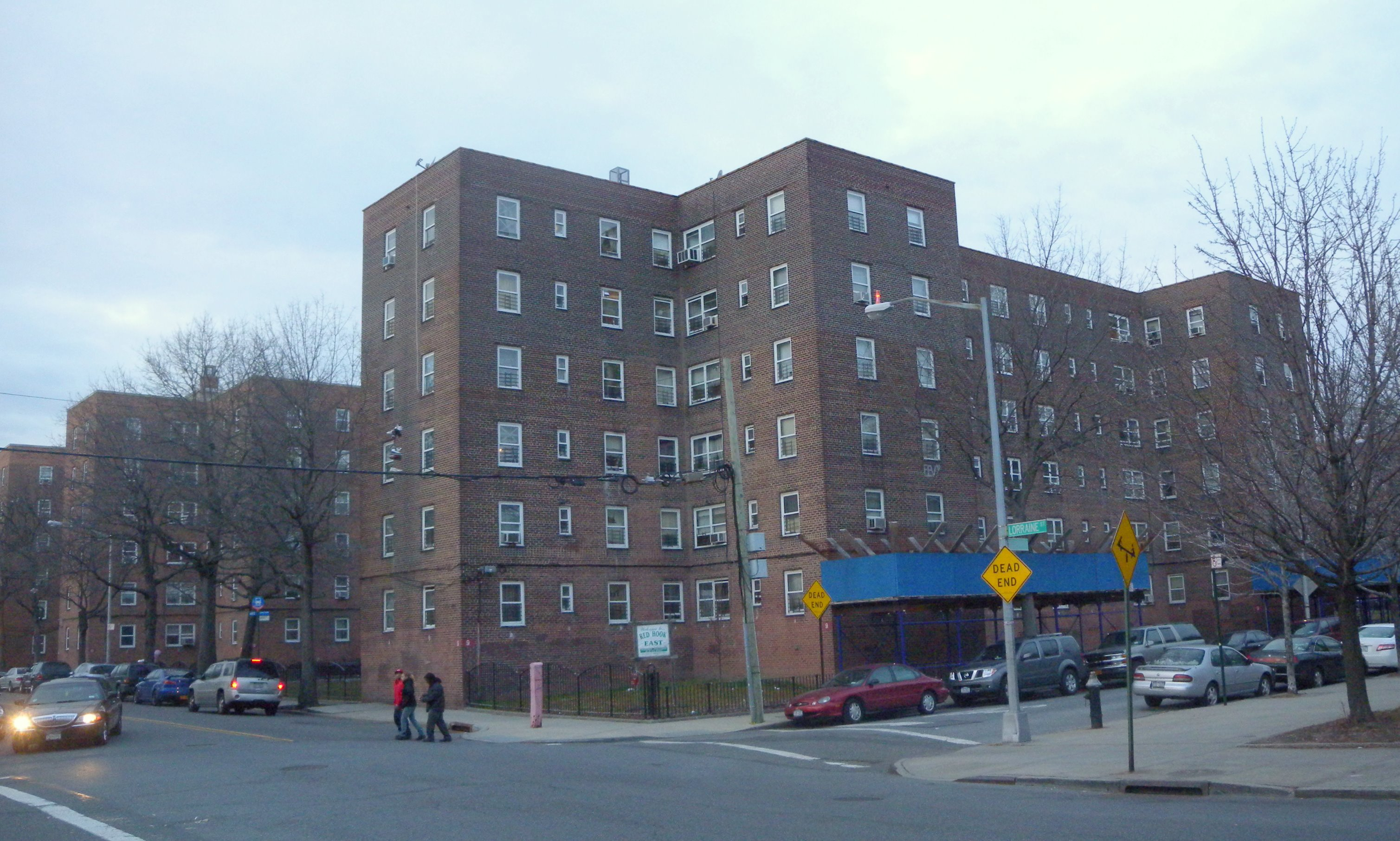
Looking northwest across Lorraine and Henry Streets at Red Hook Houses

The Red Hook Houses are two connected public housing complexes located in Red Hook, Brooklyn, New York City. Managed by the New York City Housing Authority (NYCHA), they comprise the largest housing development in Brooklyn.

The Red Hook Houses comprise Red Hook East and Red Hook West. Red Hook East is composed of 16 residential buildings and three non-residential buildings with 1,411 total units and roughly 3,000 residents. Red Hook West is composed of 14 residential buildings and one non-residential building with 1,480 total units and roughly 3,300 residents. The buildings are two and six stories tall.

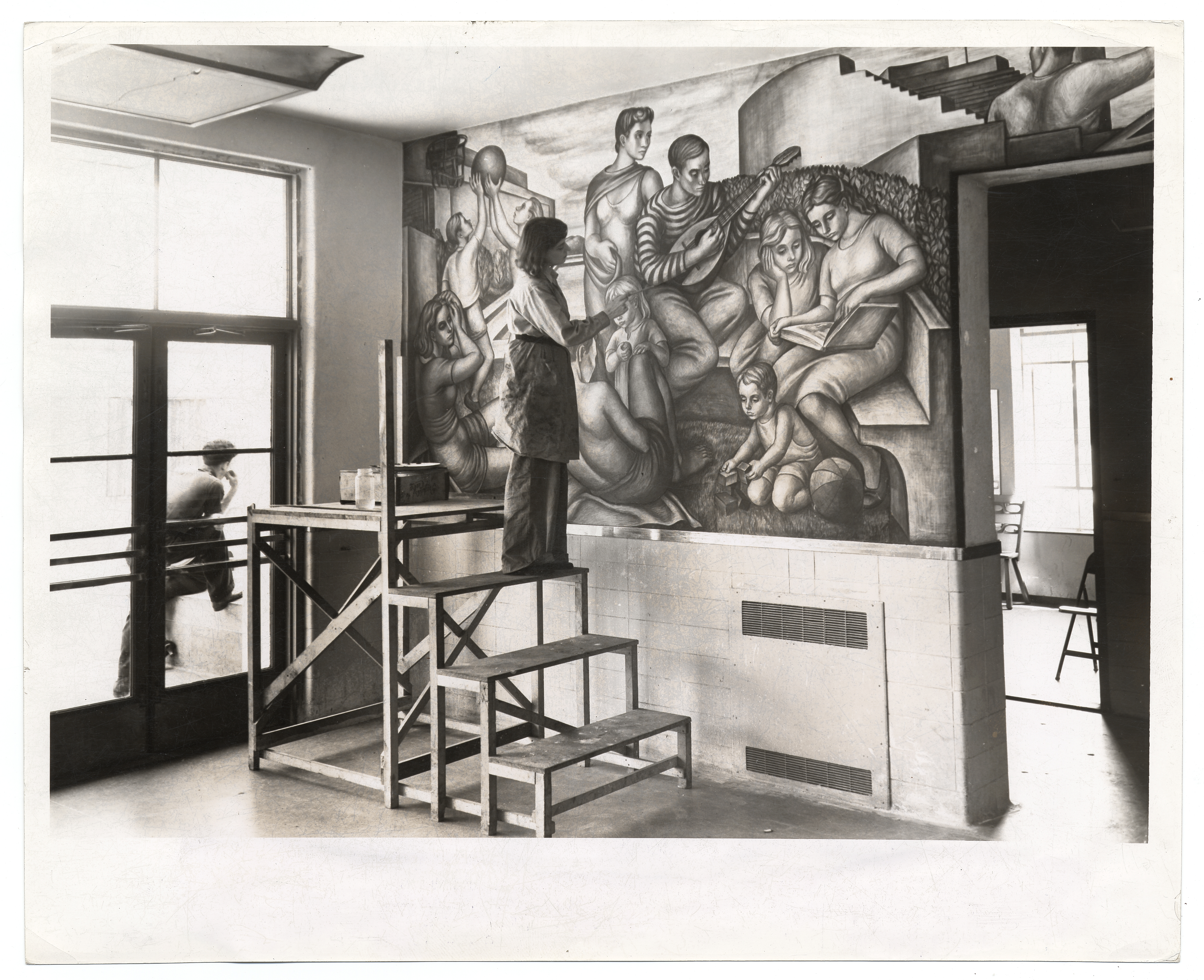
Marion Greenwood working on a fresco mural titled, "Planned Community Life" for the Red Hook Houses, 1940.

== History ==
=== Development ===
Land for the Red Hook Houses was acquired by condemnation starting in May 1938. The Red Hook Houses were designed by architect Alfred Easton Poor with landscaping by Charles N. Lowrie. Construction was completed on the 40-acre, $13 million project on November 20, 1939. Upon completion, the development was heralded as a modern living residence with fireproofing; modern kitchen, bathroom, and laundry facilities; vermin-proof; and open to light.

In 1940, Marion Greenwood was commissioned by the Federal Art Project to paint frescoes for the Red Hook Houses. The 325-square-foot (30.2 m^{2}) piece, located in the lobby, was titled Blueprint for Living and was intended to express optimism for a more harmonious future for residents. Eleanor Roosevelt toured the development, seeing Greenwood at work, and gave a speech entitled “Restoring Community Life Through Planned Housing Development.”

=== 20th century ===
On December 17, 1992, P.S. 15 principal Patrick Daly was killed when he walked into the crossfire looking for a student who left the school after a fight at the Red Hook Houses. The residents of the houses and school were shocked by the principal's death, and a 17-year-old suspect was later arrested and charged with killing Daly. After the death, undercover police officers began patrolling the development to remove drugs and violence from the area.

In 1998, the New York City Police Department led a five-month investigation of drug sales at the Red Hook Houses which ended in the arrest of 400 suspects, with 95 percent being residents of the houses.

=== 21st century ===
Between January 1, 2013, and March 30, 2015, NYCHA tested 113 apartments for lead. Of these, 105 had positive lead tests, the highest positive-test rate of any property in the city.

==== Hurricane Sandy ====
The city classifies Red Hook Houses as being in flood zone 1, indicating high flood risk. Before Hurricane Sandy in 2012, various city reports had outlined the need for increased flood protection, projecting floods as high as 5 feet during storm surges. NYCHA officials responded that they did not anticipate storm surges that strong.

When Hurricane Sandy struck, the development was inundated with 6 feet (1.8 m) of flood water through sewer overflow and high tides. The storm left residents without power and fresh water for months. This caused leaks, resulting in mold that hurt many residents' health.

After the storm, the Federal Emergency Management Agency (FEMA) promised the Red Hook Houses the $560 million, largest single portion of a $3.2 billion grant to NYCHA developments affected by the storm. In 2017, NYCHA began a $63 million project to replace the roofs of all buildings. Other planned improvements include new electrical rooms above the Design Flood Elevation (DFE), a new building for boiler equipment above DFE, the installation of standby generators, flood-proofing above DFE, restoration of mechanical, electrical and plumbing systems. Damaged playgrounds and the senior center were also to be repaired. The heat and electricity equipment was to be housed in 14 “utility pods” that would also be used as gathering place for public programs. The flood barrier is designed as a "lily pad" with raised earth in the middle of internal courtyards with an active flood wall and passive barriers. The buildings were designed by Kohn Pedersen Fox (KPF), which received merits in the 2017 AIANY Design Awards. Completion was anticipated in 2022. Many residents were skeptical of these plans, citing NYCHA dysfunction and the lack of plans to address other quality-of-life concerns such as the elevators and lead paint.

In 2018, residents faced winter heat outages due to inadequate temporary boilers that were installed after Sandy.

==== RAD PACT Conversion Plan For Red Hook Houses West ====
As of April 2026, there is a pending plan to convert Red Hook Houses West into the RAD PACT Section 8 Management where it will be managed by a private company with NYCHA remaining as the owner of the development and still implementing required federal housing policies. However, while some residents are in support of this in order to bring in needed increased government funding as well as private money from the private companies to fund needed repairs, upgrades, and maintenance and putting their trust that NYCHA will continue to deliver the same tenant protections as promised, there are also oppositions from other residents with concerns of tenant protections promised by NYCHA may not be well enforced or monitored appropriately. At this time, Red Hook Houses East is not part of the portfolio plan to convert to the RAD PACT Section 8 Management.

== Red Hook Initiative ==
In 2002, the non-profit Red Hook Initiative (RHI) was founded to tackle health and social problems affecting public housing residents. It is dedicated to youth empowerment, social justice, and sustainability.

=== Local Leaders ===
In 2013, as a response to Hurricane Sandy, RHI launched Local Leaders, a program to train public housing residents about emergency preparedness and community organizing. By 2019, 250 residents had completed the 10-week course.

=== Red Hook Farms ===
Founded in 2013 and managed by RHI, Red Hook Farms is part of NYCHA's Building Healthy Communities (BHC) initiative. The farm was built and is maintained by residents of Red Hook Houses who are between 18 and 24 and who are members of AmeriCorps' Green City Force.

=== Red Hook WiFi ===
Red Hook WiFi was in the works before Hurricane Sandy, but was accelerated after the storm cut the neighborhood off from telecommunications. The network uses wireless mesh. RHI trains young housing residents to become “digital stewards" who are paid to work 20 hours a week in a year-long program to teach mesh networking, video production, and web design, with an internship at the end of the training.

== Notable people ==
- Carmelo Anthony (born 1984), athlete
- James McBride (born 1957), writer
- Matty Rich (born 1971), film director
- Shabazz the Disciple (born 1973), rapper

== See also ==
- New York City Housing Authority
