= Carroll Gardens, Brooklyn =

Neighborhood in New York City

Carroll Gardens
- Neighborhood of Brooklyn
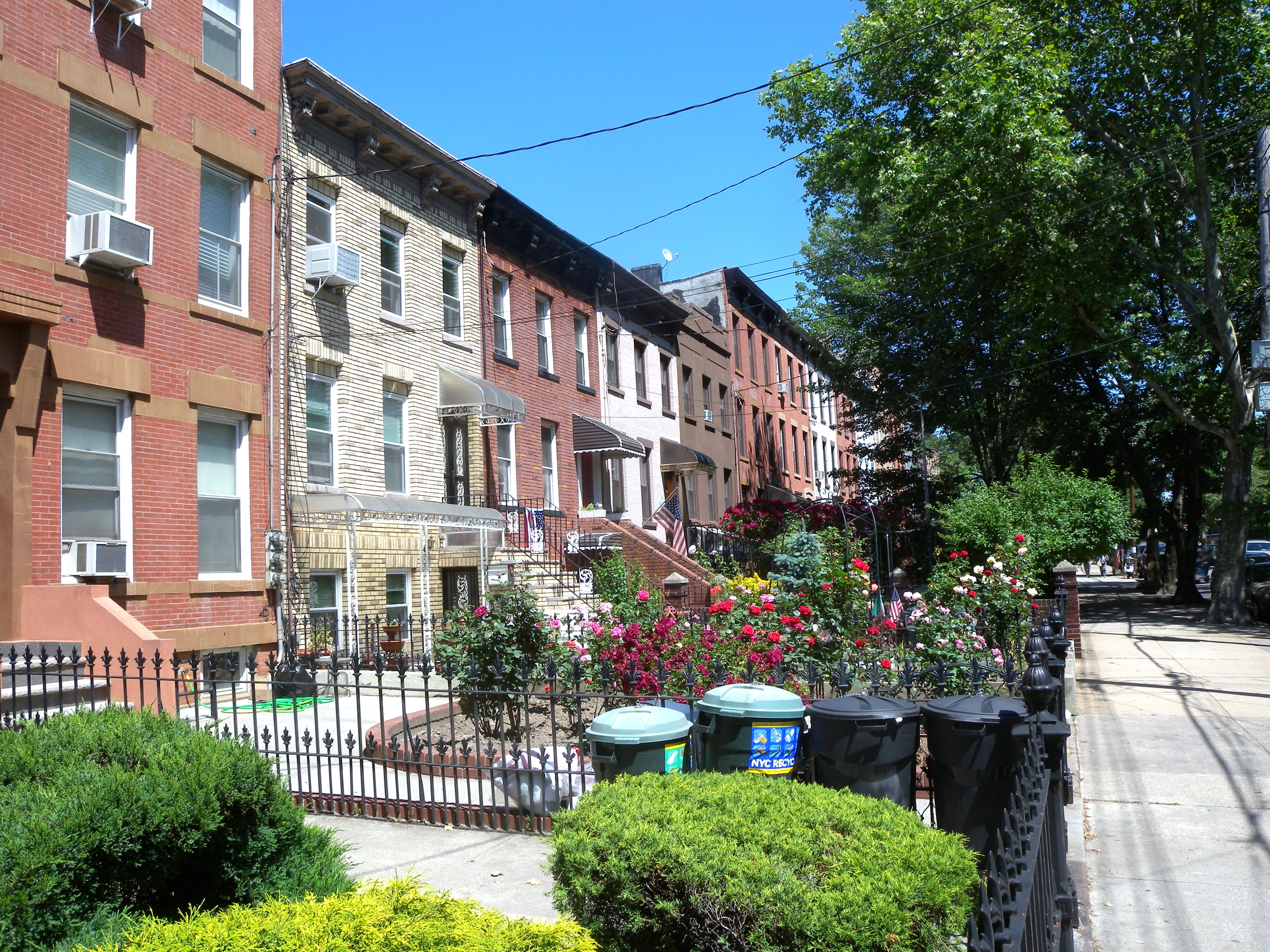
- The "Gardens" in Carroll Gardens comes from the large front gardens in the Historic District and elsewhere in the neighborhood
- Interactive map of Carroll Gardens
- Coordinates: 40.681°N 73.998°W
- Country: United States
- State: New York
- City: New York City
- Borough: Brooklyn
- Community District: Brooklyn 6

Area
  - Total: 0.247 sq mi (0.64 km^{2})

Population (2016)
  - Total: 12,853
  - Density: 52,000/sq mi (20,100/km^{2})

Ethnicity
  - White: 90.1%
  - Black: 2.9%
  - Hispanic: 12.3%
  - Asian: 1.2%

Economics
  - Median income: $125,260
- Time zone: UTC−5 (Eastern)
  - Summer (DST): UTC−4 (EDT)
- ZIP Code: 11231
- Area codes: 718, 347, 929, and 917

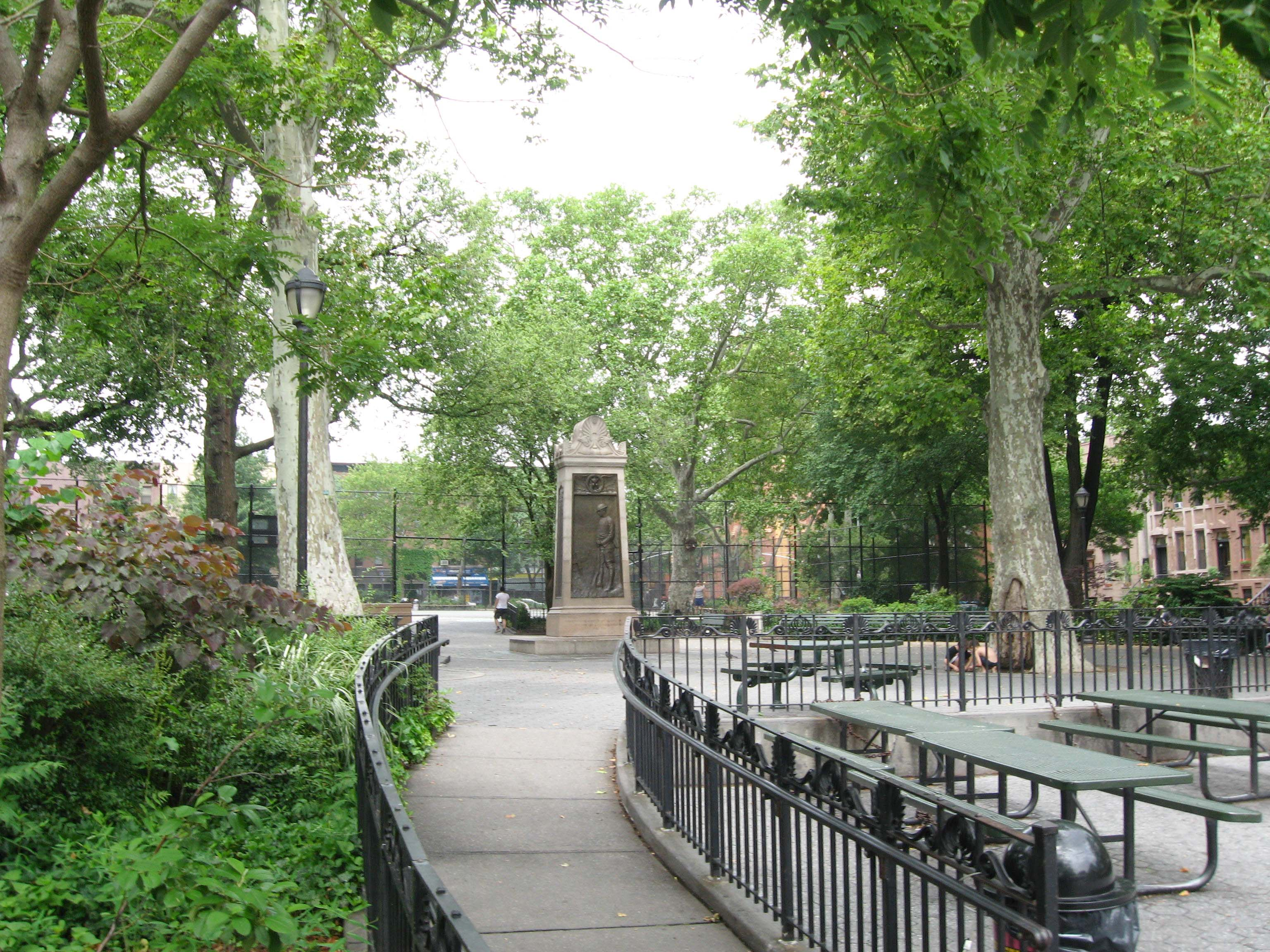
The "Carroll" in Carroll Gardens comes from Maryland's Charles Carroll, for whom Carroll Park, seen here, is also named

Carroll Gardens is a neighborhood in the northwestern portion of the New York City borough of Brooklyn. Encompassing approximately 40 city blocks, it is bounded by Degraw and Warren Streets (north), Hoyt and Smith Streets (east), Ninth Street or the Gowanus Expressway (south), and Interstate 278, the Gowanus and Brooklyn–Queens Expressways (west). The neighborhoods that surround it are Cobble Hill to the northwest, Boerum Hill to the northeast, Gowanus to the east, Red Hook to the south and southwest, and the Columbia Street Waterfront District to the west.

Originally considered to be part of the area once known as South Brooklyn (or, more specifically, Red Hook), the area started to have its own identity in the 1960s. The neighborhood was named after Charles Carroll, the only Roman Catholic signer of the Declaration of Independence, and whose name was already attached to Carroll Street and Carroll Park. The name also reflects the large front gardens of brownstones in the Carroll Gardens Historic District and elsewhere in the neighborhood. Despite having an Irish surname, in recent times it has been known as an Italian American neighborhood.

Carroll Gardens is part of Brooklyn Community District 6, and its primary ZIP Code is 11231. It is patrolled by the 76th Precinct of the New York City Police Department. and is served by the New York City Fire Department's Engine Company 239, Engine Co. 279/Ladder Co. 131 and Engine Company 202/Ladder Company 101. Politically, Carroll Gardens is represented by the New York City Council's 39th District.

== History ==
=== 19th century ===
Carroll Gardens was settled in the 19th century by immigrants from Ireland escaping the Potato Famine. They established the early Catholic roots of the neighborhood, including opening St. Stephen's Church in 1866. Beginning in the middle of the century, Norwegian immigrants were attracted by work at the docks and surrounding Red Hook area. They founded two churches, the Norwegian Seaman's Church (formerly the Westminster Presbyterian Church), now apartments, and the Norwegian Methodist Episcopal Church (formerly the Carroll Park Methodist Episcopal Church, no longer extant).

The development of the South Brooklyn area, including Carroll Gardens, was aided by the foundation in 1846 by philanthropists Henry Pierrepont and Jacob E. Leroy of the Hamilton Avenue Ferry. Its purpose was to improve transportation to the newly created Green-Wood Cemetery, but horse car service, and later trolley lines, connecting to the ferry ran through Carroll Gardens, enabling businessmen who lived there to commute more easily to work in Manhattan.

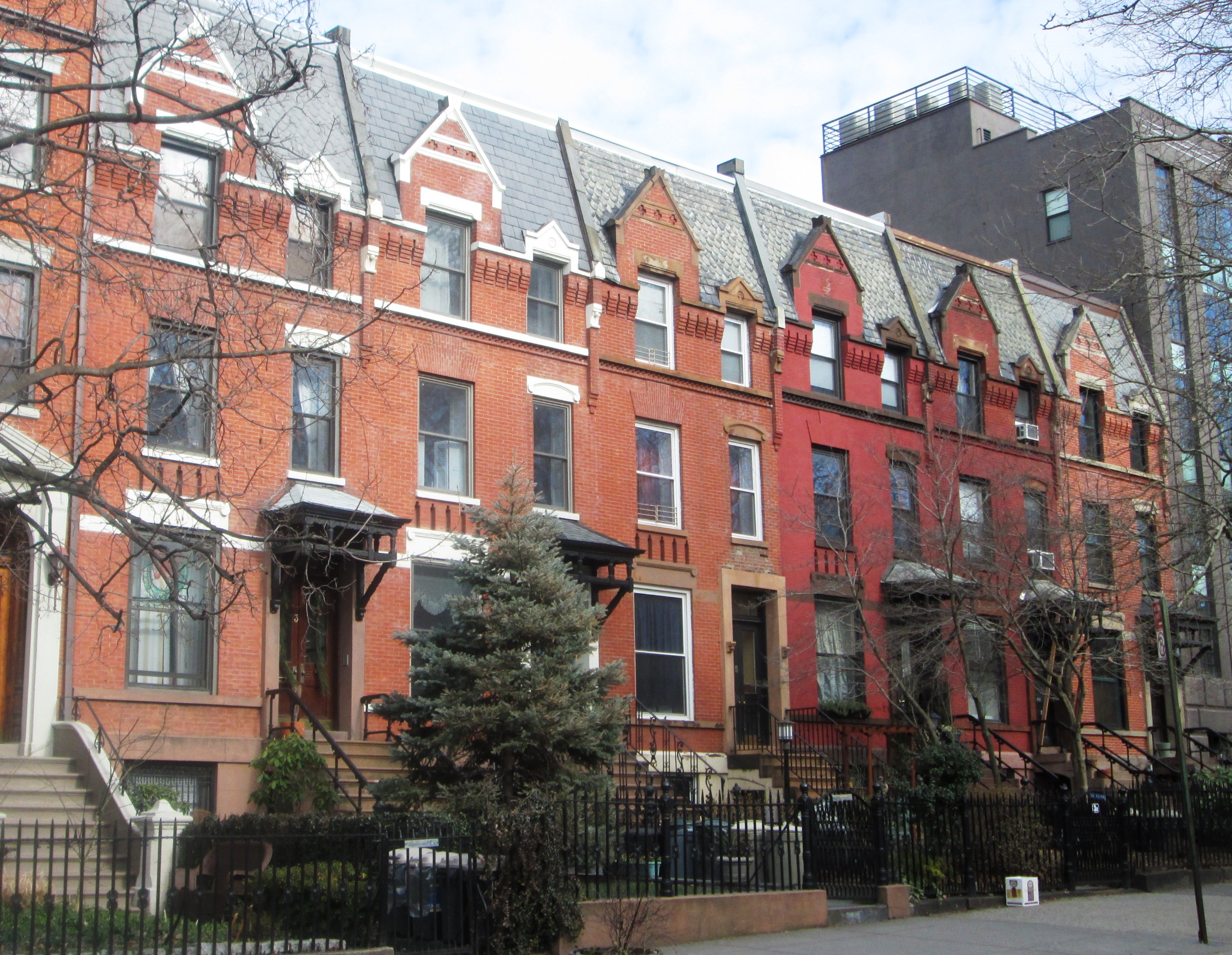
Houses with large front gardens on Second Place that were laid out in 1846 by surveyor Richard Butt.

In the late 1840s, Carroll Park, Brooklyn's third-oldest park, a block-long area of playgrounds, walkways, and sitting areas between Court, Smith, Carroll, and President Streets was built. Originally a private garden, it was purchased by the city in 1853, and was named after Charles Carroll in honor of his Maryland regiment, which had helped to defend the area during the Battle of Long Island in the American Revolutionary War.

In 1846, surveyor Richard Butt planned gardens in front of the brownstone houses in the oldest section of the neighborhood when he developed it. The homes are set farther back from the street than is common in Brooklyn, and the large gardens became an iconic depiction of the neighborhood. The same year, a law was passed requiring that all buildings between Henry Street and Smith Street have 33 feet 5.25 inches (10.1918 m) between the building and the street for "courtyards". The large gardens can be seen from First to Fourth Place between Henry and Smith Streets, as well as on President, Carroll, and Second Streets between Smith and Hoyt Streets.

Further development of the Carroll Gardens was aided by the draining in the late 1860s of the swampland which surrounded Gowanus Creek through the deepening and dredging of the Creek to create the Gowanus Canal. This provoked land speculation and a building boom throughout the area. It was during this period, from the late 1860s to the early 1880s, that the area which is now the Carroll Gardens Historic District began to be developed.

=== 20th century ===
Italian immigrants began coming to the neighborhood in the late 19th century – dock workers and workers in the Brooklyn Navy Yard – continuing through the 1950s, which led to much of the Irish population of the area leaving beginning in the 1920s. The rise of the Italian population provoked questions about the role of the Mafia in the neighborhood. One theory has it that Carroll Gardens, which lies between a territory traditionally controlled by the Gambino crime family and one controlled by the Colombo family, is considered to be neutral territory, and has been, for the most part, left alone.

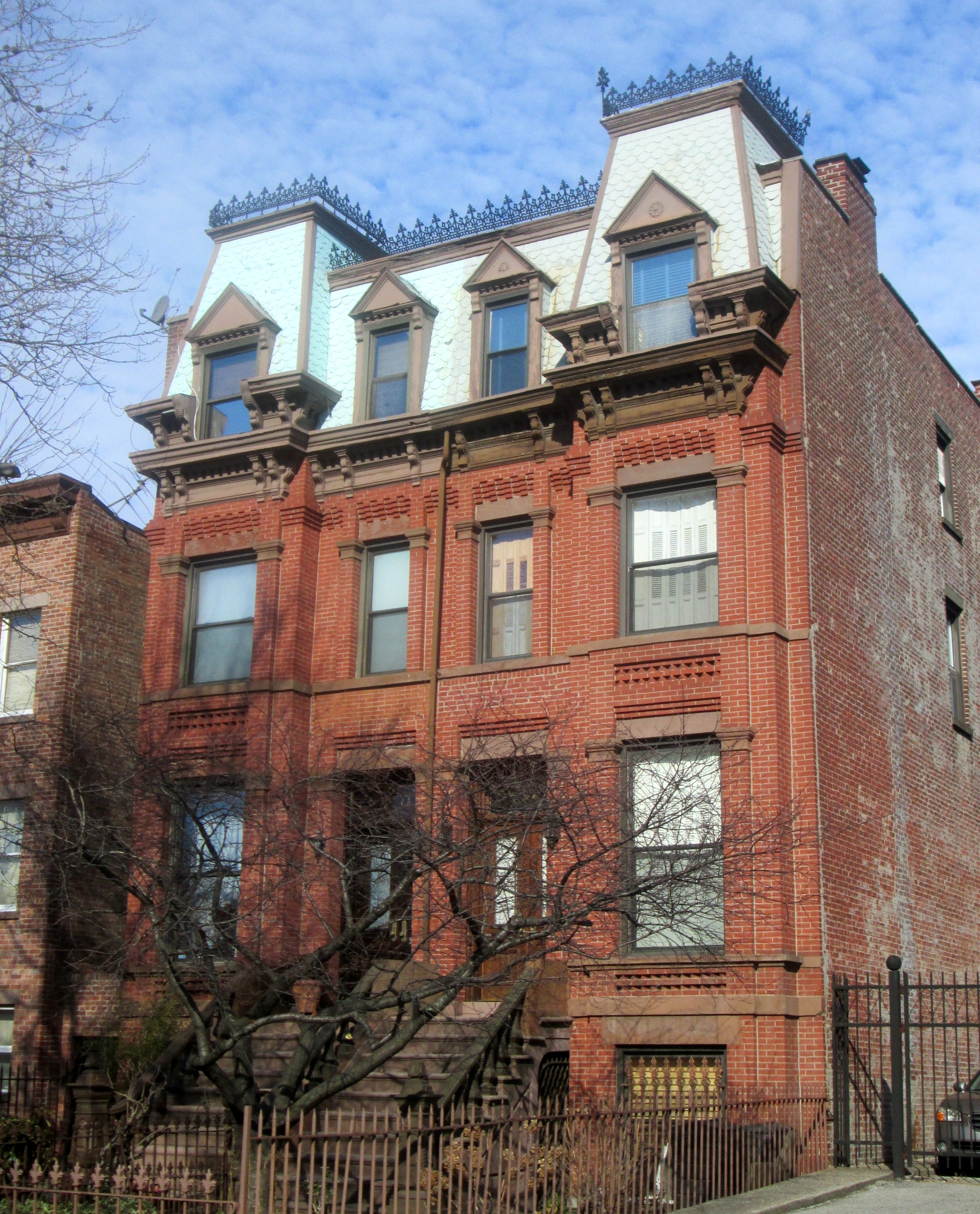
Apartment building on Third Place, dates from c. 1875...

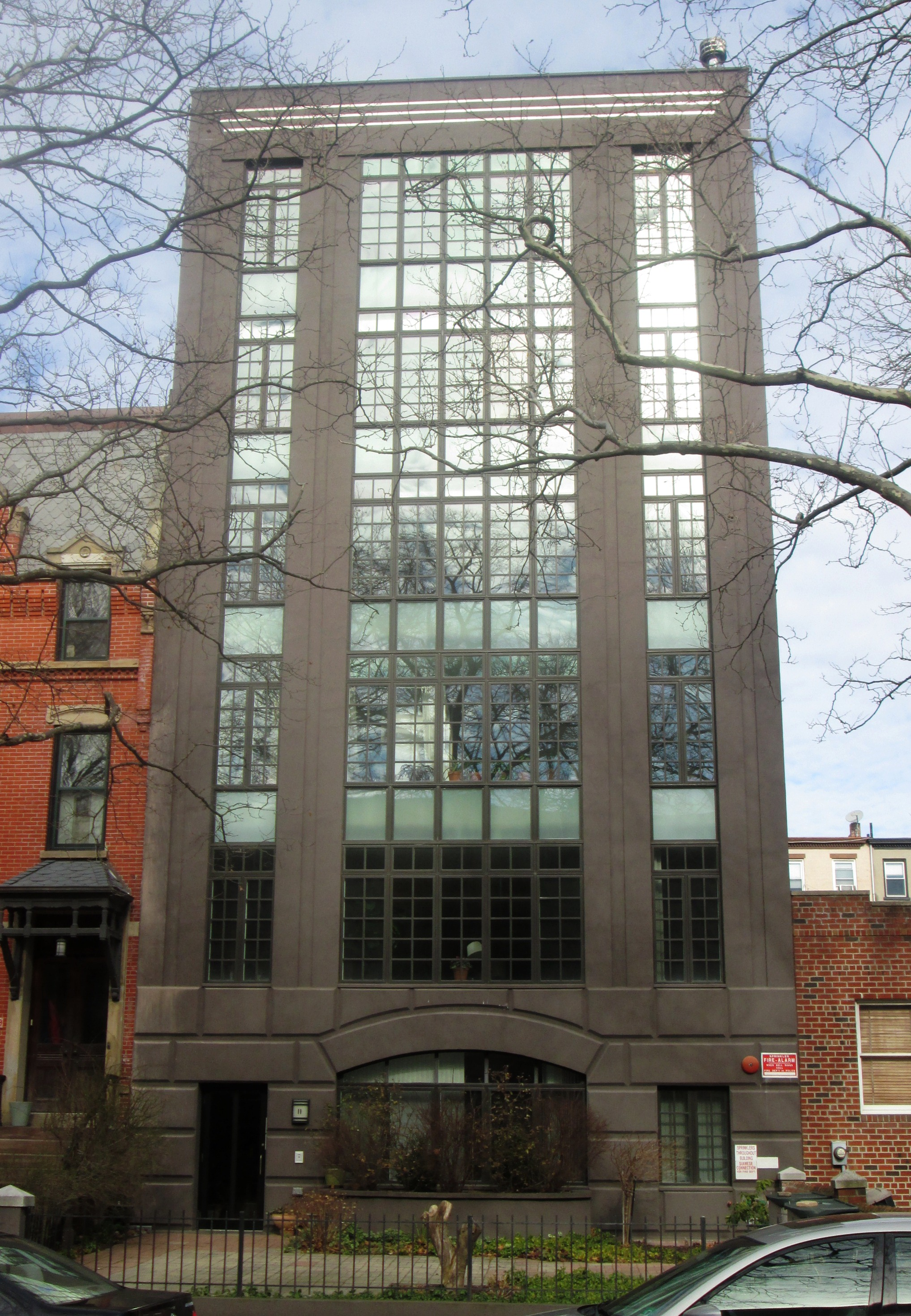
...and one on Second Place from 1965

Carroll Gardens had long been considered to be part of either the larger area referred to as South Brooklyn, or the neighborhood known as Red Hook. That neighborhood had an informal division in the 1930s and 1940s along Hamilton Avenue, with kids from south of the avenue, mostly of Italian descent, calling themselves "Hookers" or "Hookies" after Red Hook, and kids north of the street, mostly Irish, in what would now be Carroll Gardens called "Creekers" or "Creekies" after the now-drained Gowanus Creek. Violence between the two groups was common. The division between the neighborhoods became even stronger beginning in the late 1940s when Robert Moses built the Brooklyn-Queens Expressway and the Gowanus Expressway, which started the process of the Carroll Gardens area taking on a separate and distinct character of its own; the neighborhood's name came from the Carroll Gardens Association, which had been created to advocate for neighborhood improvements.

In the 1960s, young middle-class professionals began to be attracted to the Carroll Garden area due to its convenience to Manhattan, where many of them worked, and its growing reputation as a safe and quiet place to live. This began the gentrification of the neighborhood, and a response from older residents, who did not appreciate these "hippie" newcomers who had no ties to the community. Regardless, the neighborhood gradually received its own name at that time, and the Carroll Gardens Association was formed in 1964. One result was that the decades-long control of the area by a political machine was ended.

Today, Carroll Gardens is predominantly upper middle-class, while Red Hook, which had retained its working-class, waterfront ambiance, has only recently begun to feel the effects of gentrification. However, the two neighborhoods have historically both been working-class and a mix of working-class Italian-American, African-American, and Hispanic-American residents, as well as more recent Arab-American immigrant families. As late as the 1990s, several highly publicized incidents of violence underscored the tension between working-class African-Americans from Red Hook and working-class Italian-American residents of Carroll Gardens.

=== 21st century ===
Carroll Gardens is still largely known as an Italian-American neighborhood, but the Italian population has decreased in recent years from 52 percent of the population in 1980 to 22 percent in 2012. Still, despite the decline in the Italian segment of the population and the effects of gentrification, the neighborhood remains a strongly Italian one. Italians in the neighborhood often play bocce games, speak several dialects of Italian, and operate many Italian restaurants and shops, as well as join fraternal and benevolent associations attached to specific towns in Italy. The Roman Catholicism of the Italian population is still evident in the many shrines, especially to the Virgin Mary, which can be seen in front gardens in the neighborhood, and the 70-year tradition of an Our Lady of Sorrows procession celebrating Good Friday continues. Adult children who had moved away from Carroll Gardens have started returning to the neighborhood to raise their children.

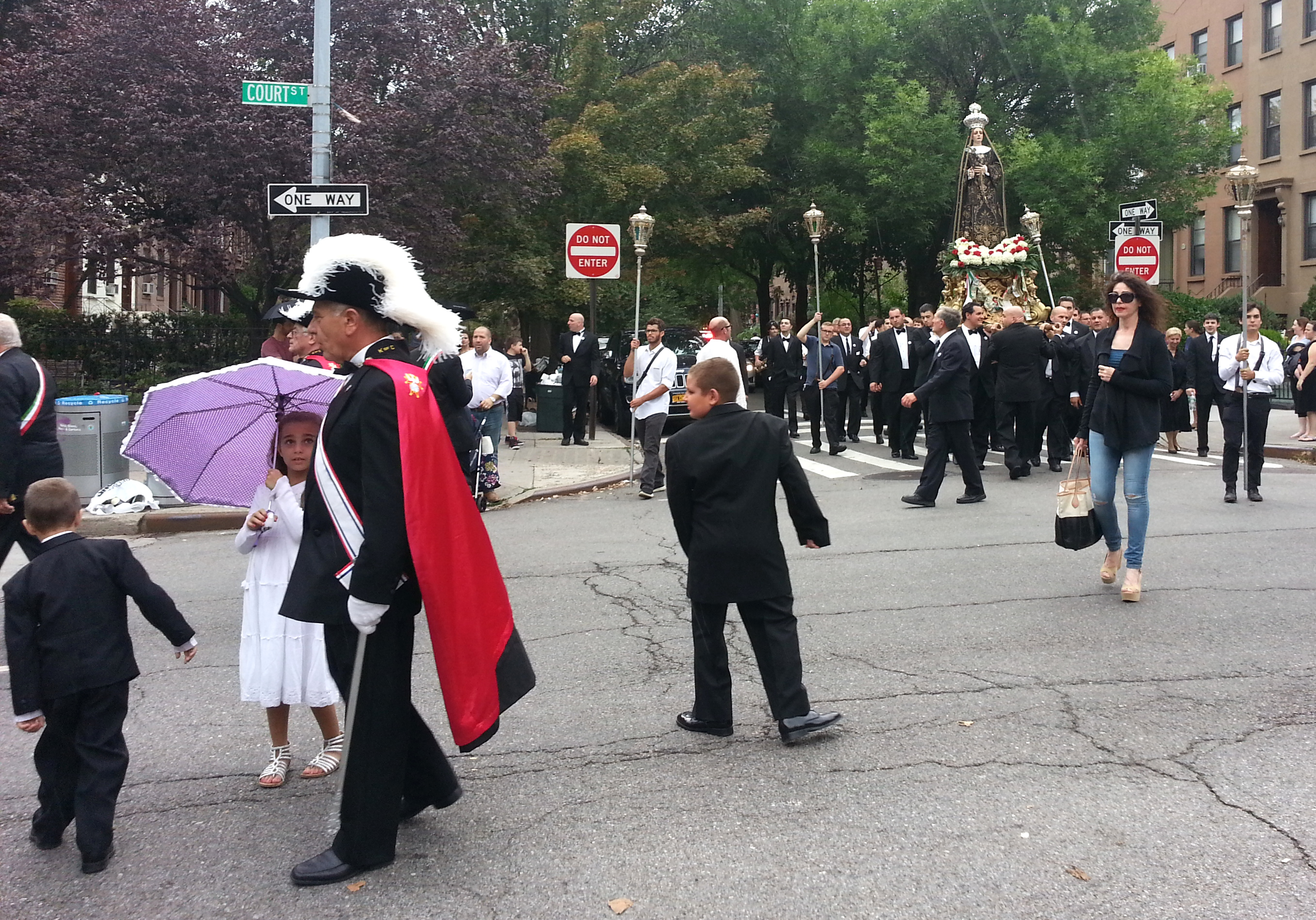
The tradition of an annual Our Lady of Sorrows procession on Good Friday began in the 1940s as a celebration of the patron saint of immigrants from Mola di Bari.

The area has seen an increase in French immigrants starting in the 21st century. Carroll Gardens and the surrounding neighborhoods are sometimes referred to as "Little France" or "Little Paris" due to the growing French population. Bastille Day celebrations are held on July 14 of each year. International School of Brooklyn, a Nursery-8th grade independent school, offers a French and Spanish language immersion program. One of the public schools in Carroll Gardens, The Carroll School (P.S. 58), also has one of the area's French dual-language programs, which was one of the first such French programs at a public school in the city. A Catholic mass in French is said every Sunday at the St. Agnes Church in Carroll Gardens. This initiative of the Diocese of Brooklyn occurred after the neighboring Archdiocese of New York, incurred the wrath of French worshipers in Manhattan by deciding to close the French national parish of St. Vincent de Paul Church. French expatriates operate several restaurants and shops in the neighborhood, including La Cigogne, Café Luluc, Provence en boite, French Louie, Chez Moi, and Bar Tabac.

== Carroll Gardens Historic District ==
The development of what is now the Carroll Gardens Historic District began in the 1870s, due in part to its proximity to Carroll Park. The district was created by the New York City Landmarks Preservation Commission in 1973. It includes houses located in a rough rectangle bounded by Carroll, President, Smith, and Hoyt Streets, as well as the western ends of the two blocks between President Street and First Street. The district includes some of the finest examples of brownstones with large front gardens.

== Points of interest ==
- The John Rankin House, 440 Clinton Street, built c.1840 in the Greek Revival style. When Rankin, a wealthy merchant, built this house, which was one of the largest of the 1840s in Brooklyn, the area was still primarily farmland, and the house had a view of Upper New York Bay. The house was designated a New York City landmark in 1970 and was added to the National Register of Historic Places in 1978.
- The South Congregational Church Complex included the Early Romanesque Revival Church and Chapel at 358–366 Court Street, built in 1851 (chapel) and 1857 (church); the neo-Gothic Rectory at 255 President Street, built in 1893 and designed by Woodruff Leeming; and the Ladies Parlor at 257 President Street, built in 1889 and designed by F. Carles Merry in the Romanesque Revival style. At one time the chapel became the Calvary Baptist Church of Red Hook. All of the buildings have been converted to condominium apartments. The complex in a New York City landmark, designated in 1982.
- St. Paul's Episcopal Church at 199 Carroll Street. The congregation was founded in 1849, during the heyday of Brooklyn's industrialization, and the church was built in 1867–84 and was designed by the firm Richard Upjohn & Son in the Victorian Gothic style.
- The Sacred Hearts of Jesus and Mary and St. Stephen's Church at Summit and Hicks Streets, was built c.1860 as St. Stephen's Church; the parish's name changed when it merged with another which lost its church in 1941 due to the building of the Brooklyn Queens Expressway. This church was designed by Patrick Charles Keely in the Gothic Revival style.
- The Westminster Presbyterian Church at 450 Clinton Avenue at First Place was built c.1865 in the Romanesque Revival style. It became Den Norske Sjomannskirke (the Norwegian Seaman's Church), founded by Norwegian immigrants; it was once visited by the King of Norway during an official visit to the United States. The church building has now been converted to condominium apartments. However, there is a Norwegian Seamen's Church located in Manhattan.
- St. Mary's Star of the Sea Church, located at 471 Court Street between Luquer and Nelson Streets was built in 1853 and was designed by Patrick Charles Keely. Originally constructed to serve as a cathedral, the church was built with Italian and European stones and marble. The church was where Al Capone married Mae Josephine Coughlin. A rectory and a girls' school – now the International School of Brooklyn – are also part of the church complex.
- Dennett Place is a short mews of residences running between Luquer and Nelson Streets in the block between Court and Smith Streets.
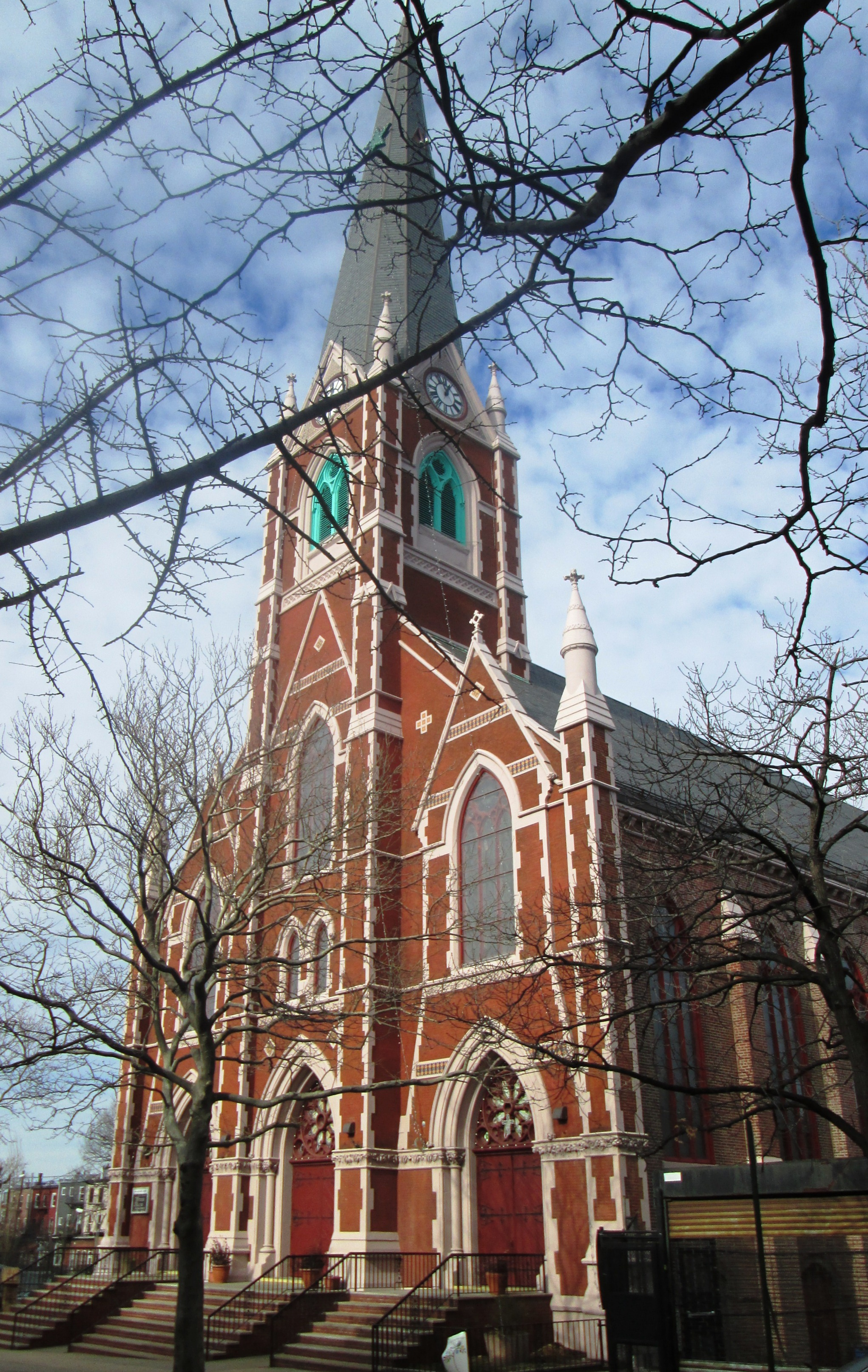
Sacred Hearts of Jesus and Mary and St. Stephen's Church

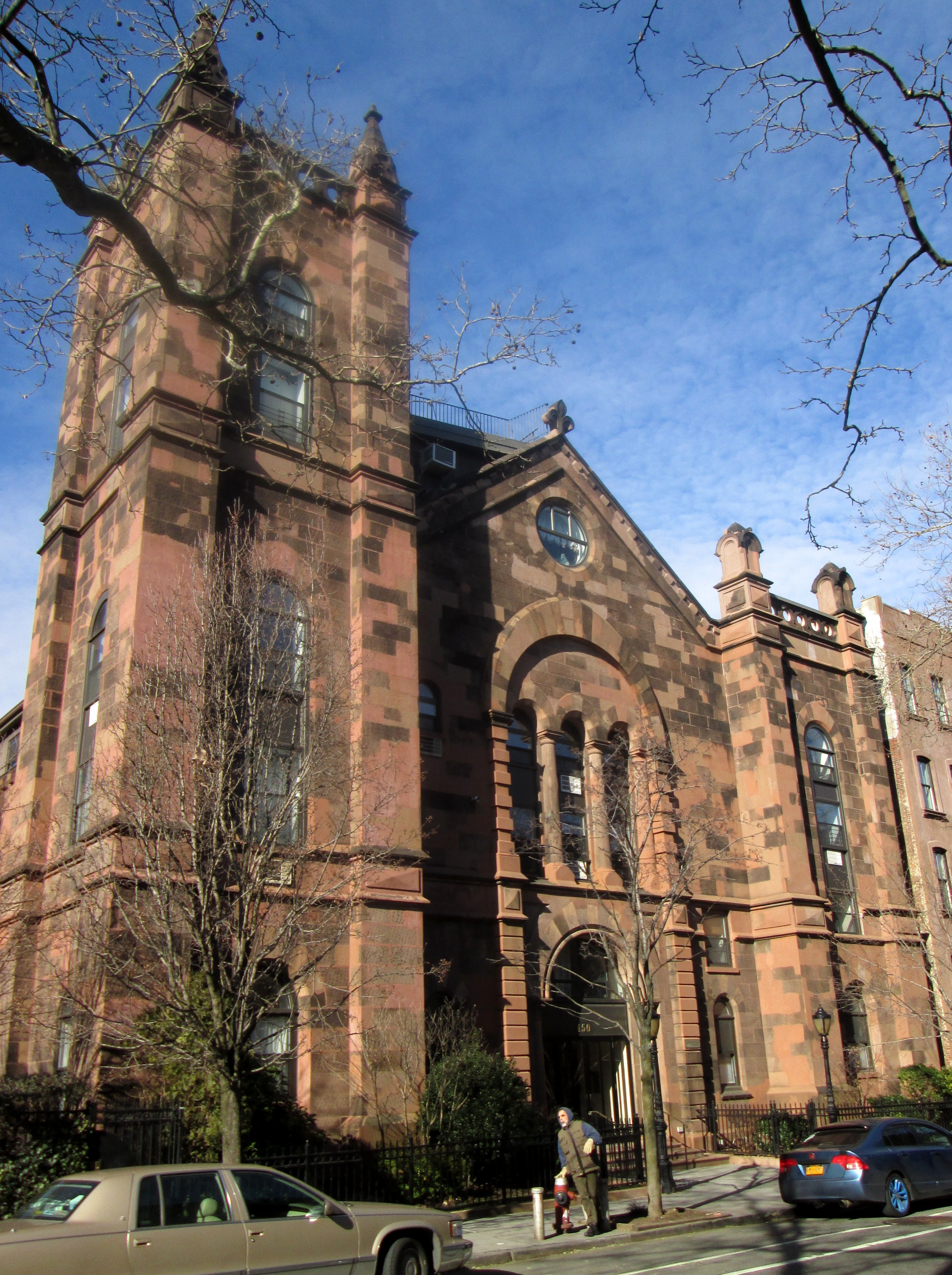
Westminster Presbyterian, later Norwegian Seamen's Church, now apartments

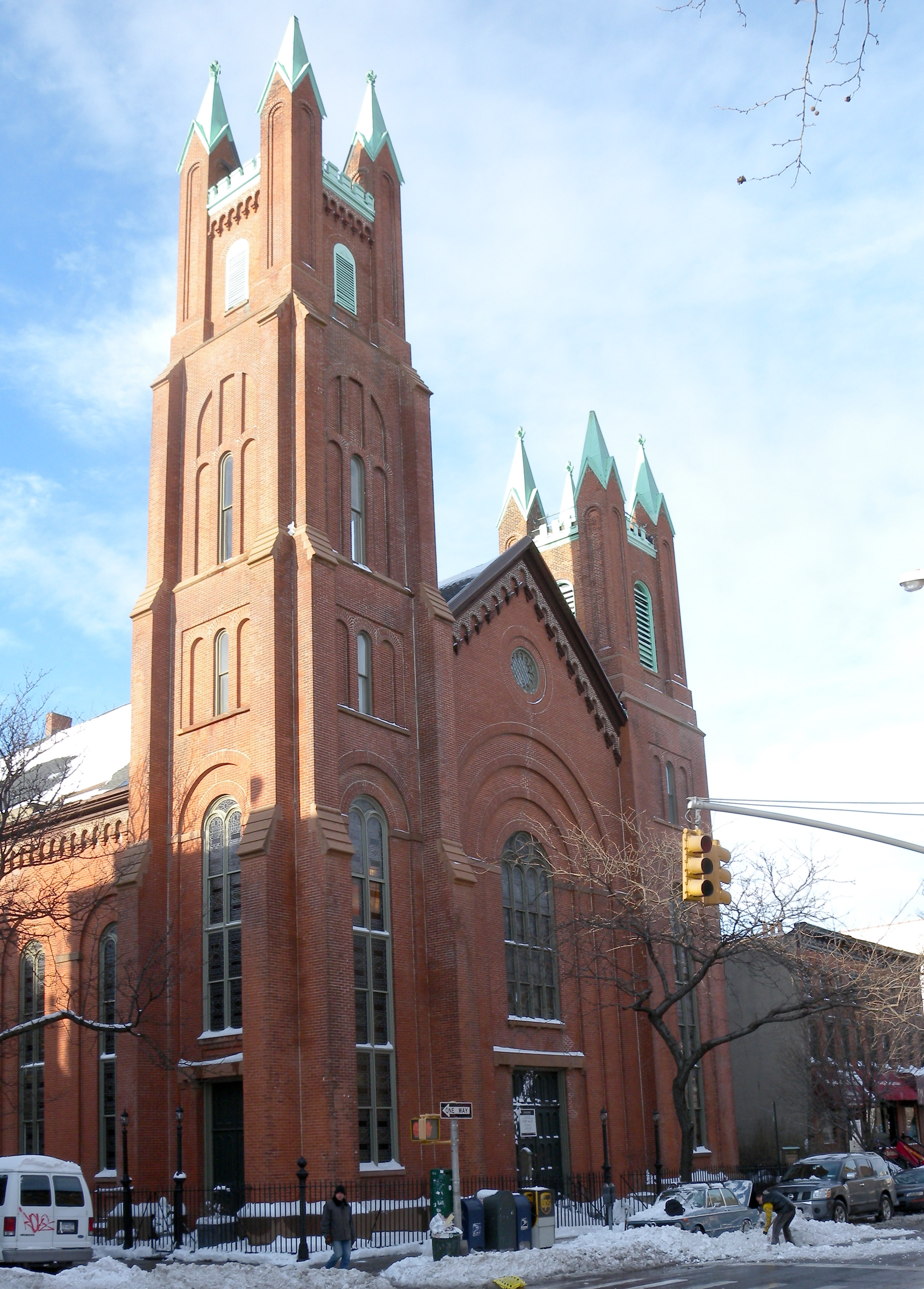
South Congregational Church, now apartments

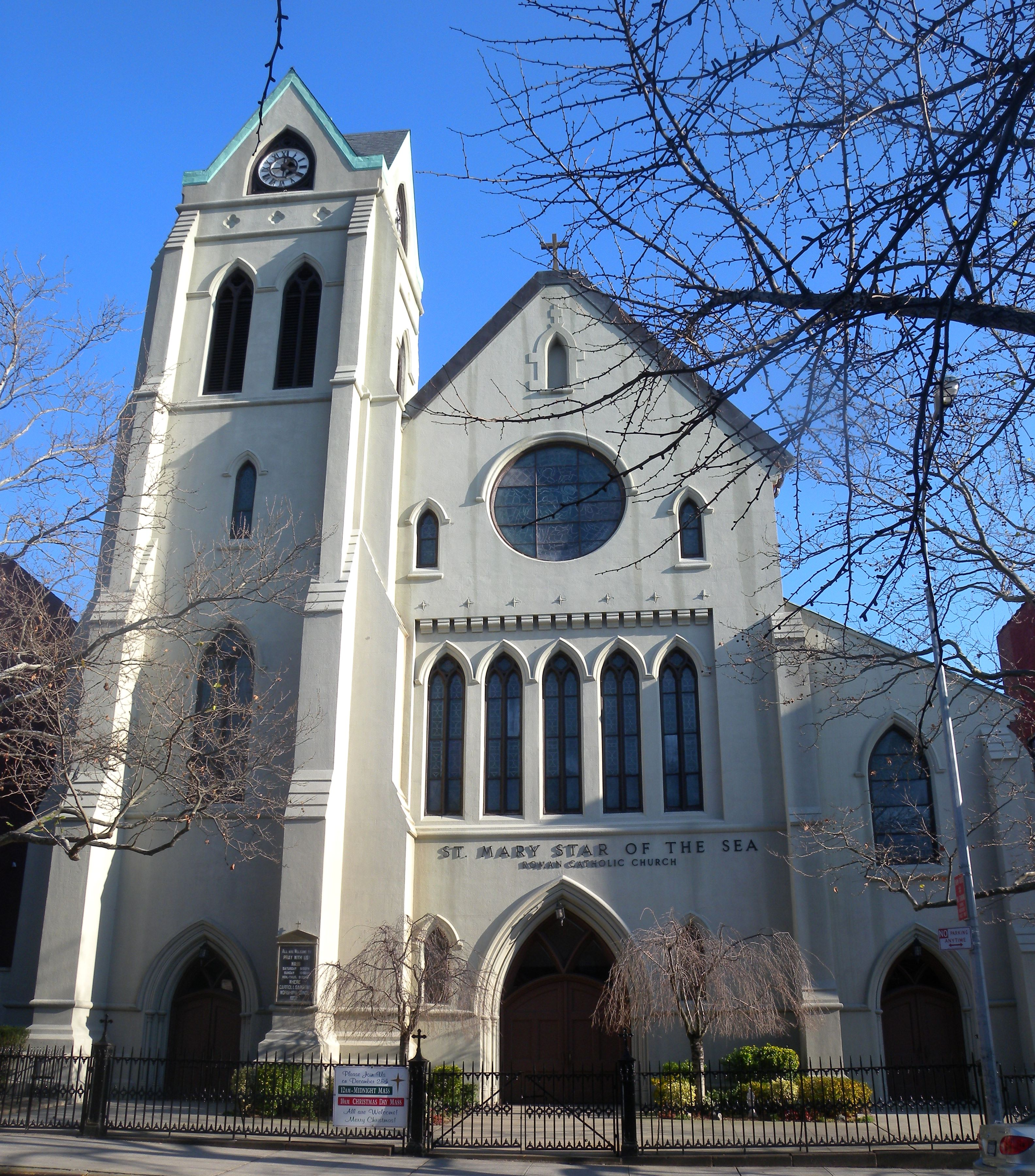
St Mary Star of the Sea Church
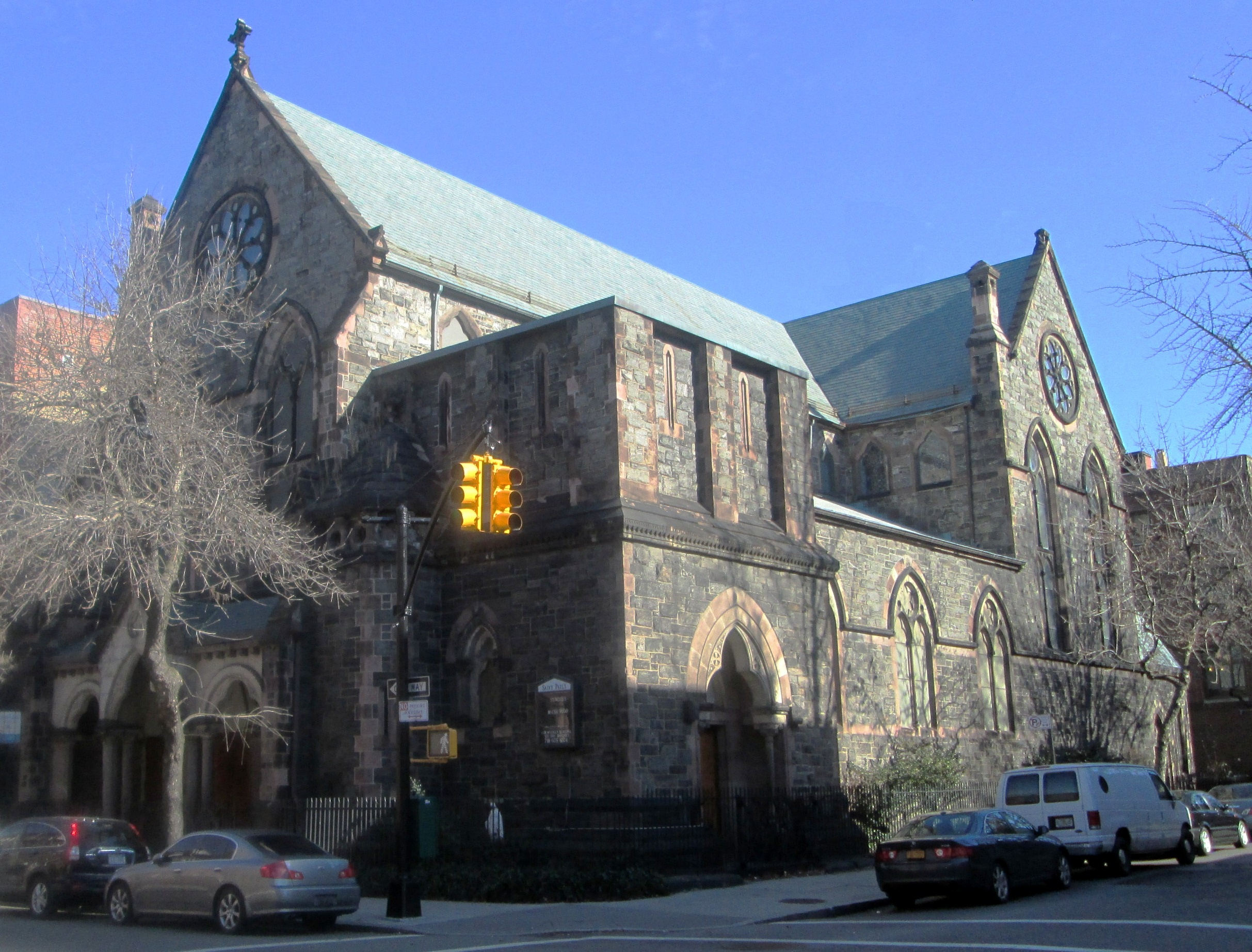
St. Paul's Episcopal Church

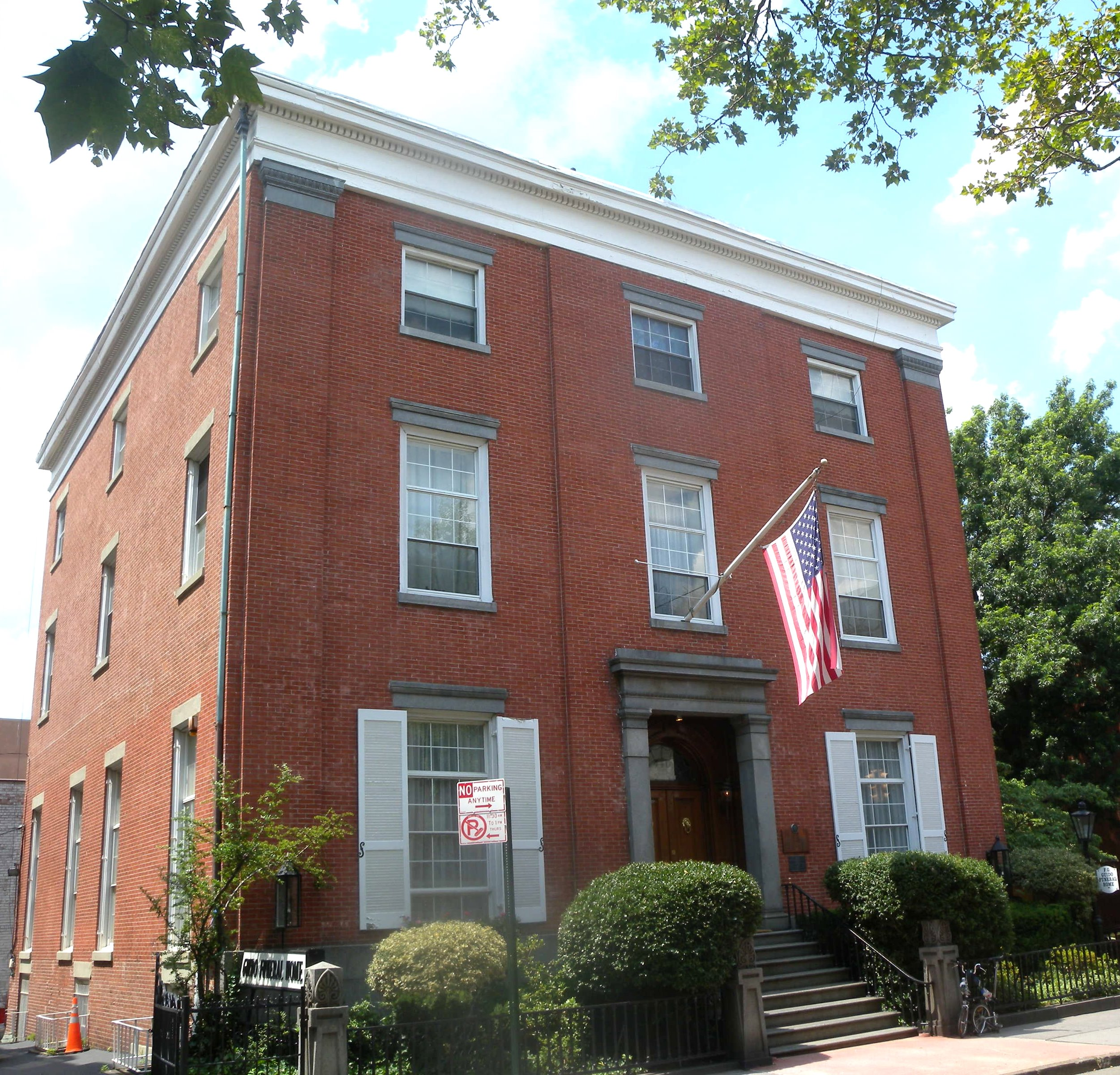
John Rankin House, now a funeral home

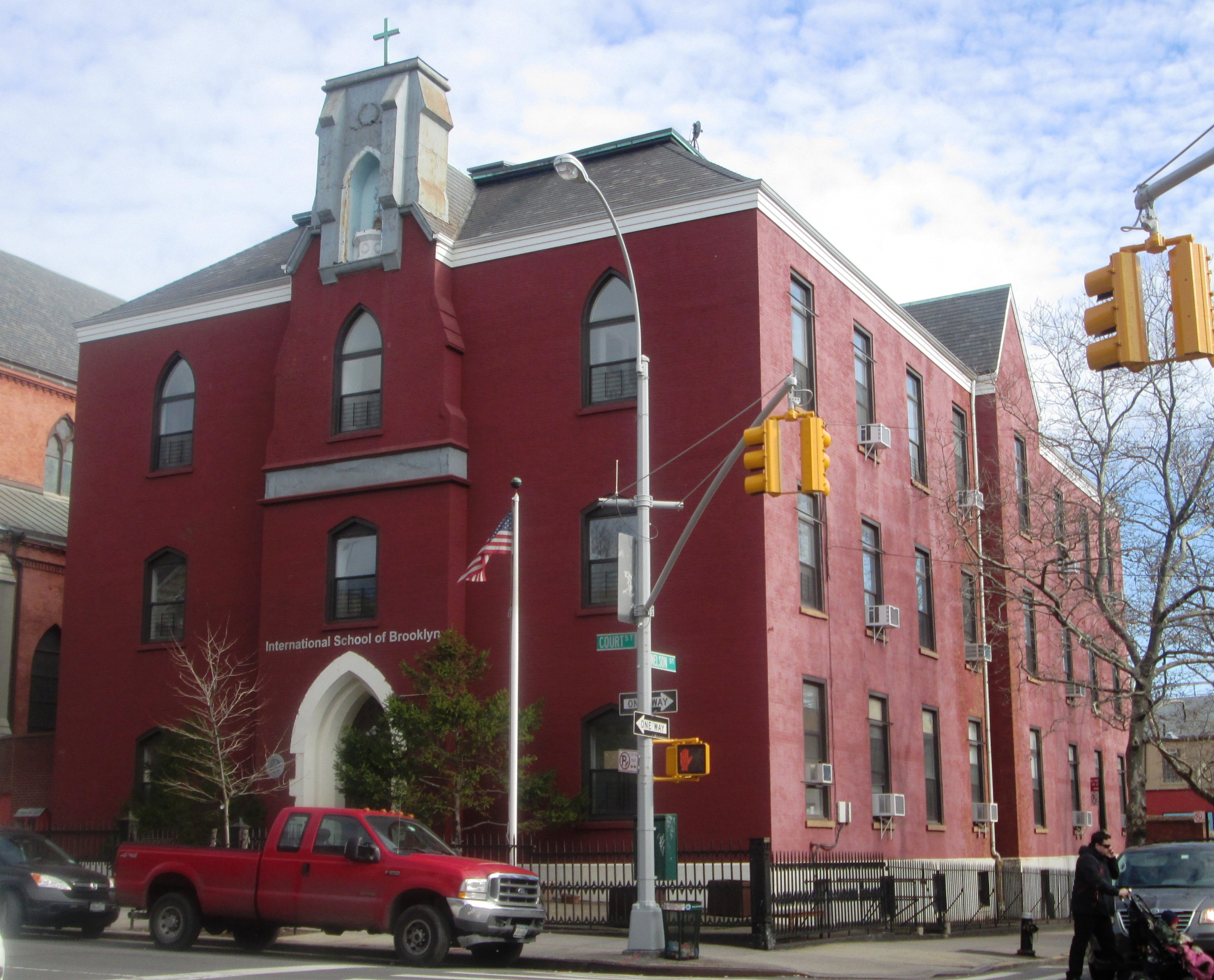
The International School of Brooklyn, formerly a parish school for girls of St. Mary Star of the Sea

== Demographics ==
Based on data from the 2010 United States census, the population of the Carroll Gardens/Columbia Street/Red Hook neighborhood tabulation area was 38,353, a change of 26 (0.1%) from the 38,327 counted in 2000. Covering an area of 1,040.71 acres (421.16 ha), the neighborhood had a population density of 36.9 inhabitants per acre (23,600/sq mi; 9,100/km^{2}).

The racial makeup of the neighborhood was 60.9% (23,342) White, 11.9% (4,573) African American, 0.2% (61) Native American, 4.5% (1,728) Asian, 0% (13) Pacific Islander, 0.4% (143) from other races, and 2.4% (912) from two or more races. Hispanic or Latino of any race were 19.8% (7,581) of the population.

The entirety of Community Board 6, which covers areas around Park Slope and Carroll Gardens, had 109,351 inhabitants as of NYC Health's 2018 Community Health Profile, with an average life expectancy of 81.4 years. This is slightly higher than the median life expectancy of 81.2 for all New York City neighborhoods. Most inhabitants are middle-aged adults and youth: 18% are between the ages of 0–17, 46% between 25 and 44, and 20% between 45 and 64. The ratio of college-aged and elderly residents was lower, at 5% and 10%, respectively.

As of 2016, the median household income in Community Board 6 was $134,804. In 2018, an estimated 10% of Park Slope and Carroll Gardens residents lived in poverty, compared to 21% in all of Brooklyn and 20% in all of New York City. Fewer than one in fifteen residents (6%) was unemployed, compared to 9% in the rest of both Brooklyn and New York City. Rent burden, or the percentage of residents who had difficulty paying their rent, was 37% in Park Slope and Carroll Gardens, lower than the citywide and boroughwide rates of 52% and 51%, respectively. Based on this calculation, as of 2018, Park Slope and Carroll Gardens were considered to be high-income and not gentrifying.

== Police and crime ==
Carroll Gardens is patrolled by the 76th Precinct of the NYPD, located at 191 Union Street. The 76th Precinct ranked 37th safest out of 69 patrol areas for per-capita crime in 2010. As of 2018, with a non-fatal assault rate of 30 per 100,000 people, Park Slope and Carroll Gardens' rate of violent crimes per capita is less than that of the city as a whole. The incarceration rate of 294 per 100,000 people is lower than that of the city as a whole.

The 76th Precinct has a lower crime rate than in the 1990s, with crimes across all categories having decreased by 83.1% between 1990 and 2018. The precinct reported 4 murders, 9 rapes, 53 robberies, 91 felony assaults, 65 burglaries, 210 grand larcenies, and 28 grand larcenies auto in 2018.

== Fire safety ==
The New York City Fire Department (FDNY) operates three fire stations serving Carroll Gardens:

- Engine Co. 202/Ladder Co. 101 – 31 Richards Street
- Engine Co. 279/Ladder Co. 131 – 252 Lorraine Street
- Engine Co. 239 – 395 4th Avenue

== Health ==
Preterm and teenage births are less common in Park Slope and Carroll Gardens than in other places citywide. In Park Slope and Carroll Gardens, there were 27 preterm births per 1,000 live births (compared to 87 per 1,000 citywide), and 7.9 births to teenage mothers per 1,000 live births (compared to 19.3 per 1,000 citywide). Park Slope and Carroll Gardens has a relatively high population of residents who are uninsured, or who receive healthcare through Medicaid. In 2018, this population of uninsured residents was estimated to be 22%, which is higher than the citywide rate of 12%.

The concentration of fine particulate matter, the deadliest type of air pollutant, in Park Slope and Carroll Gardens is 0.0089 milligrams per cubic metre (8.9×10^{−9} oz/ft^{3}), higher than the citywide and boroughwide averages. Fifteen percent of Park Slope and Carroll Gardens residents are smokers, which is slightly higher than the city average of 14% of residents being smokers. In Park Slope and Carroll Gardens, 15% of residents are obese, 6% are diabetic, and 22% have high blood pressure—compared to the citywide averages of 24%, 11%, and 28% respectively. In addition, 9% of children are obese, compared to the citywide average of 20%.

Ninety-four percent of residents eat some fruits and vegetables every day, which is higher than the city's average of 87%. In 2018, 88% of residents described their health as "good", "very good", or "excellent", greater than the city's average of 78%. For every supermarket in Park Slope and Carroll Gardens, there are 12 bodegas.

== Education ==
Park Slope and Carroll Gardens generally have a much higher ratio of college-educated residents than the rest of the city as of 2018. The majority (74%) of residents age 25 and older have a college education or higher, while 9% have less than a high school education and 17% are high school graduates or have some college education. By contrast, 40% of Brooklynites and 38% of city residents have a college education or higher. The percentage of Park Slope and Carroll Gardens students excelling in reading and math has been increasing, with reading achievement rising from 41 percent in 2000 to 53 percent in 2011, and math achievement rising from 35 percent to 64 percent within the same time period.

Park Slope and Carroll Gardens's rate of elementary school student absenteeism is lower than the rest of New York City. In Park Slope and Carroll Gardens, 11% of elementary school students missed twenty or more days per school year, compared to the citywide average of 20% of students. Additionally, 77% of high school students in Park Slope and Carroll Gardens graduate on time, higher than the citywide average of 75% of students.

=== Schools ===
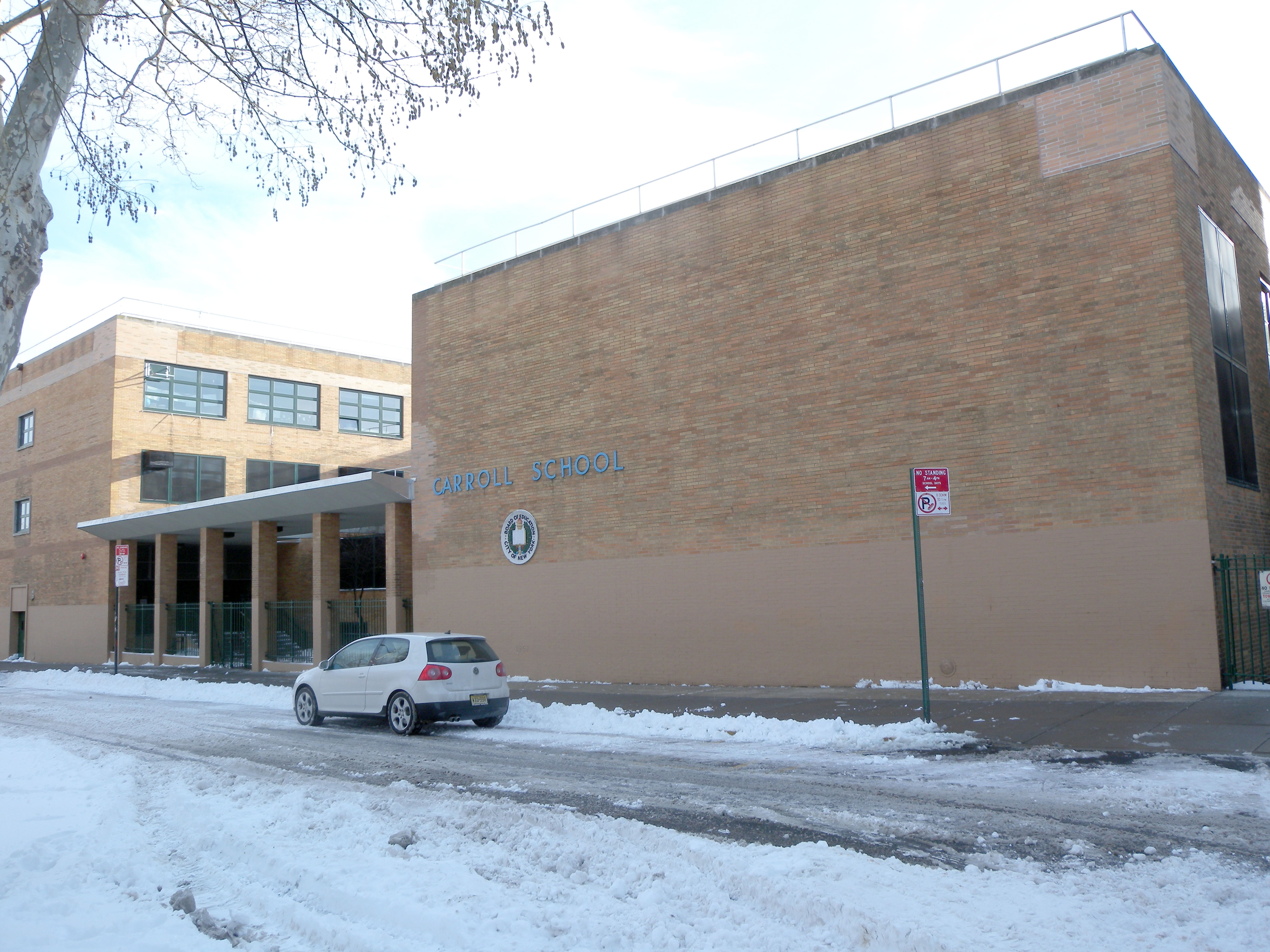
The Carroll School (P.S. 58)

The New York City Department of Education operates a number of public schools in the neighborhood: Patrick F. Daly (P.S. 15), John M. Harrigan (P.S. 29), The Carroll School (P.S. 58), Samuel Mills Sprole (P.S. 32), the Brooklyn New School (P.S. 146), Brooklyn School of Collaborative Studies (M.S. 448), and the School for Innovation (M.S. 442). The Carroll School (P.S. 58) is known for its dual-language immersion program, which offers a French immersion experience in both English and French for a portion of the students at the school. This program, which began in 2007, has encouraged a growing French-speaking population in the neighborhood.

Also in the area are the New Dawn Charter High School, International School of Brooklyn, Hannah Senesh Community Day School, the Mary McDowell Friends Middle School, and St. Mary's School.

=== Library ===
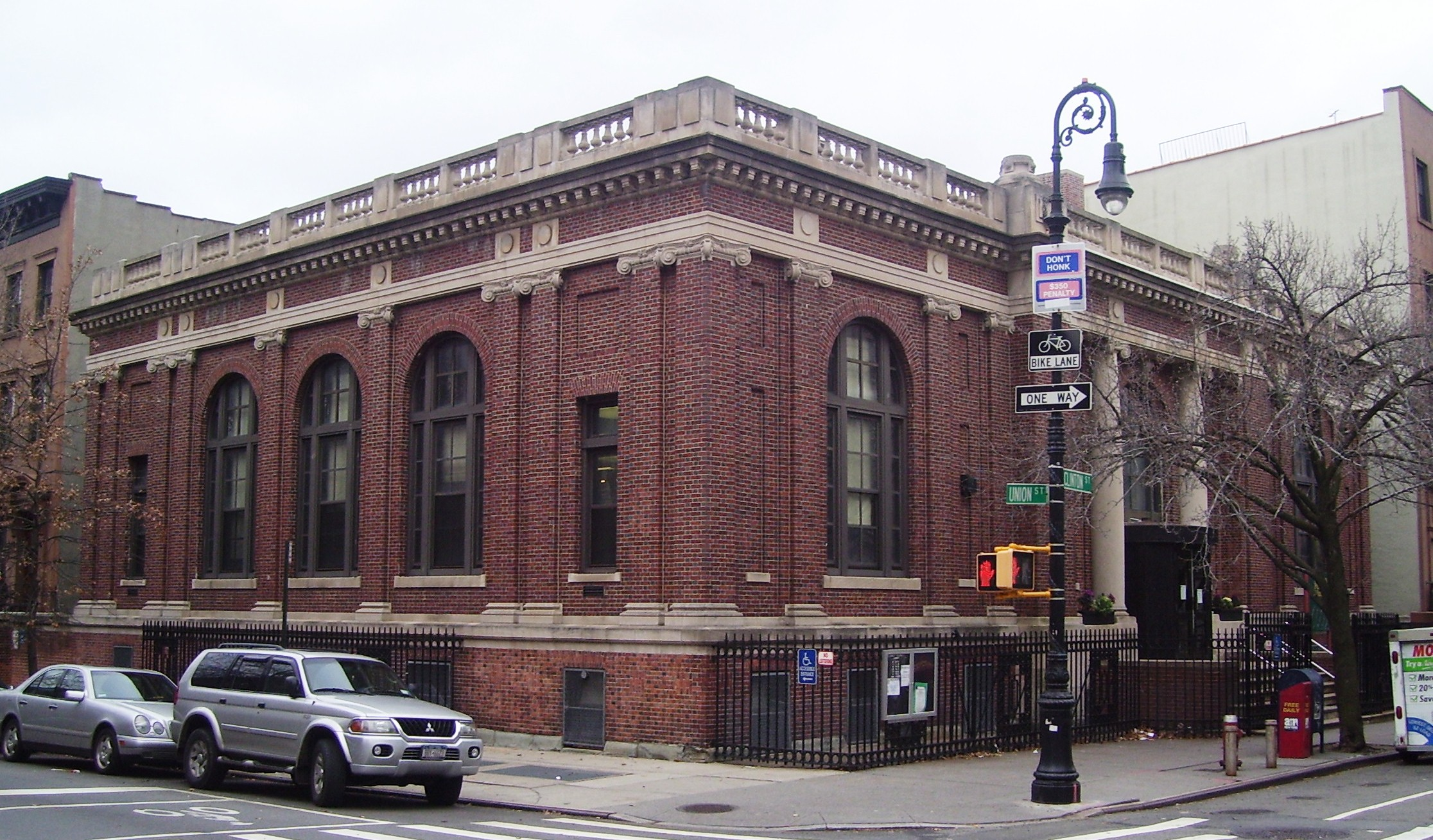
Carroll Gardens branch of the Brooklyn Public Library

The Brooklyn Public Library (BPL)'s Carroll Gardens branch is located at 396 Clinton Street near Union Street. The library, originally the Carroll Park branch, opened in 1901 in a rented facility. The library moved to its current facility, a 14,000-square-foot (1,300 m^{2}) Carnegie library designed by William B. Tubby, in 1905. After extensive renovations, the library received its current name in response to a request from the community.

== Sports ==
Several 19th-century baseball fields in the community, collectively referred to as Carroll Park, were home fields for several clubs from the early days of baseball, including Excelsior of Brooklyn before they moved to their Red Hook grounds.

== Transportation ==
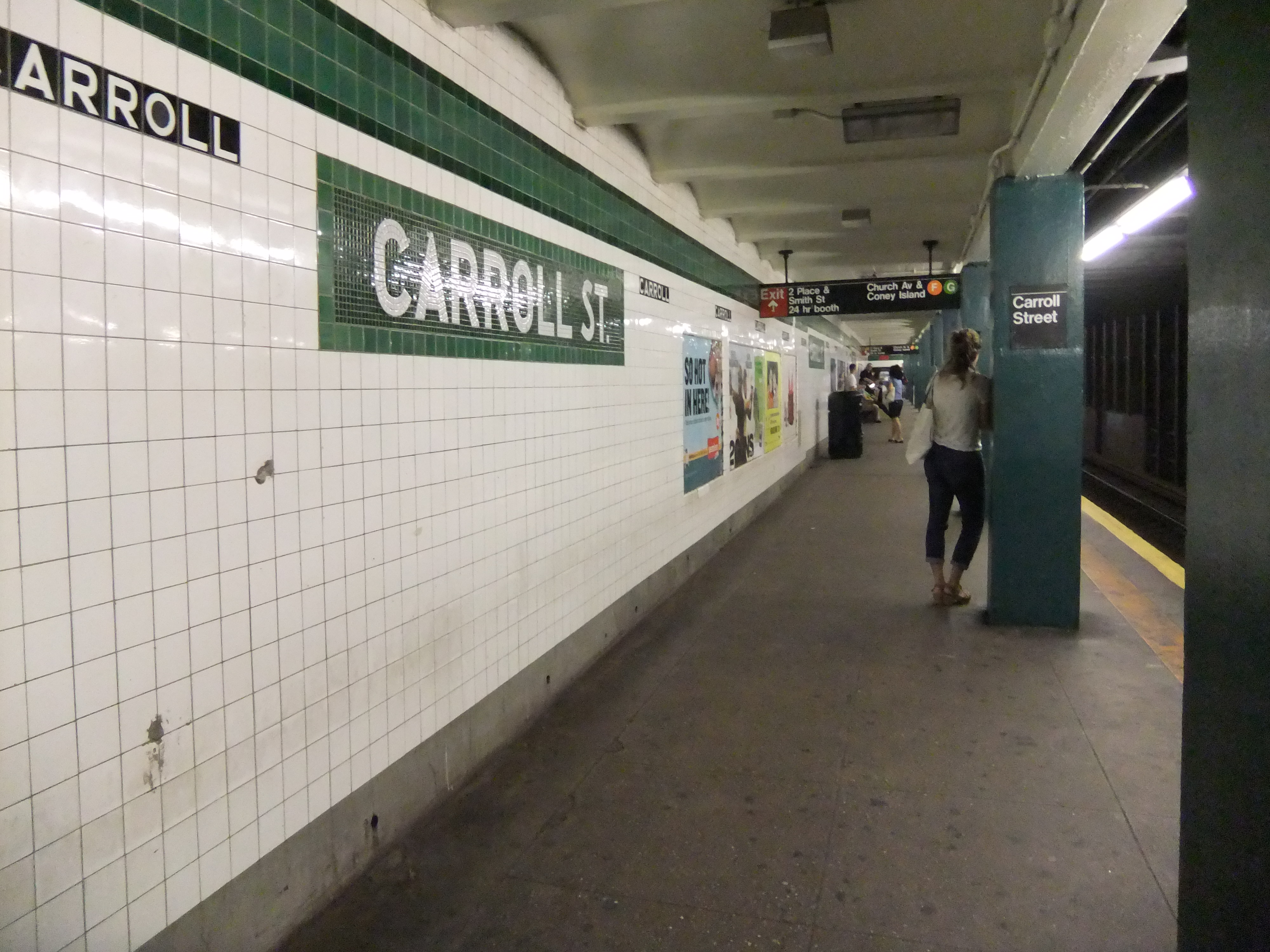
Carroll Street station

The New York City Subway's Carroll Street and Smith–Ninth Streets stations service the F and G trains. Bus service through the neighborhood is available from the B61 on 9th Street and the B57 on Court and Smith Streets.

== Notable residents ==
- Lily Allen (born 1985), singer-songwriter and actress; lived in Carroll Gardens until 2025
- Nicole Beland, former Men's Health Girl Next Door
- Mike Birbiglia, (born 1978), comedian, actor, director, producer and writer.
- Stanley Bosworth (1927–2011), founding headmaster of Saint Ann's School in Brooklyn, which he led from 1965 to 2004.
- Salvatore Cassano (born 1945), 32nd New York City Fire Commissioner
- Stanley Crouch (1945–2020), poet, music and cultural critic, syndicated columnist, novelist, and biographer
- Brendan J. Dugan (1947–2016), 18th President of St. Francis College
- Eileen C. Dugan (1945–1996), politician who served eight terms in the New York State Assembly.
- Dan Estabrook (born 1969), photographer
- David Harbour (born 1975), actor; lived in Carroll Gardens until 2025
- Angelica Hicks (born 1992), English fashion illustrator and TikToker
- Jemima Kirke (born 1985), English-American artist and actress best known for her role as Jessa Johansson on the television series Girls.
- Solange Knowles (born 1986), singer, songwriter.
- Stacy London (born 1969), fashion stylist and media personality
- Ari Melber (born 1980), MSNBC host of The Beat with Ari Melber
- Jim Neu (1943–2010), playwright.
- Oz Pearlman (born 1982), mentalist and magician.
- Joe Sarno (1921–2010), sexploitation film pioneer
- Daniel Squadron (born 1979), former member of the New York Senate for the 26th district
- George Weber (1961–2009), radio personality

== In popular culture ==
- In the 1987 film Moonstruck, the characters played by Cher and Nicolas Cage met at the now closed Cammareri Brothers Bakery on Henry Street in Carroll Gardens.
