= Beland =

Beland or Béland may refer to:

== People ==
- Beland Honderich, Canadian newspaper executive
- Daniel Beland, Canadian figure skater
- David Beland, Canadian athlete
- Henri Sévérin Béland, Canadian parliamentarian
- Jean-Louis Béland, Canadian politician
- Joseph Béland, Canadian politician
- Jules Béland, Canadian cyclist
- Louis Béland-Goyette, Canadian soccer player
- Ma Beland (1870–1952), American criminal
- Nicole Beland, American journalist
- Richard Beland, American Hockey Player

== Other ==
- Città Beland, title held by the city of Żejtun, Malta
- R. v. Béland, a Supreme Court of Canada decision
- Beland, Oklahoma, a ghost town in Oklahoma.
