= St. Paul's Episcopal Church (Brooklyn) =

Church in Brooklyn, New York

- U.S. National Register of Historic Places
- New York State Register of Historic Places
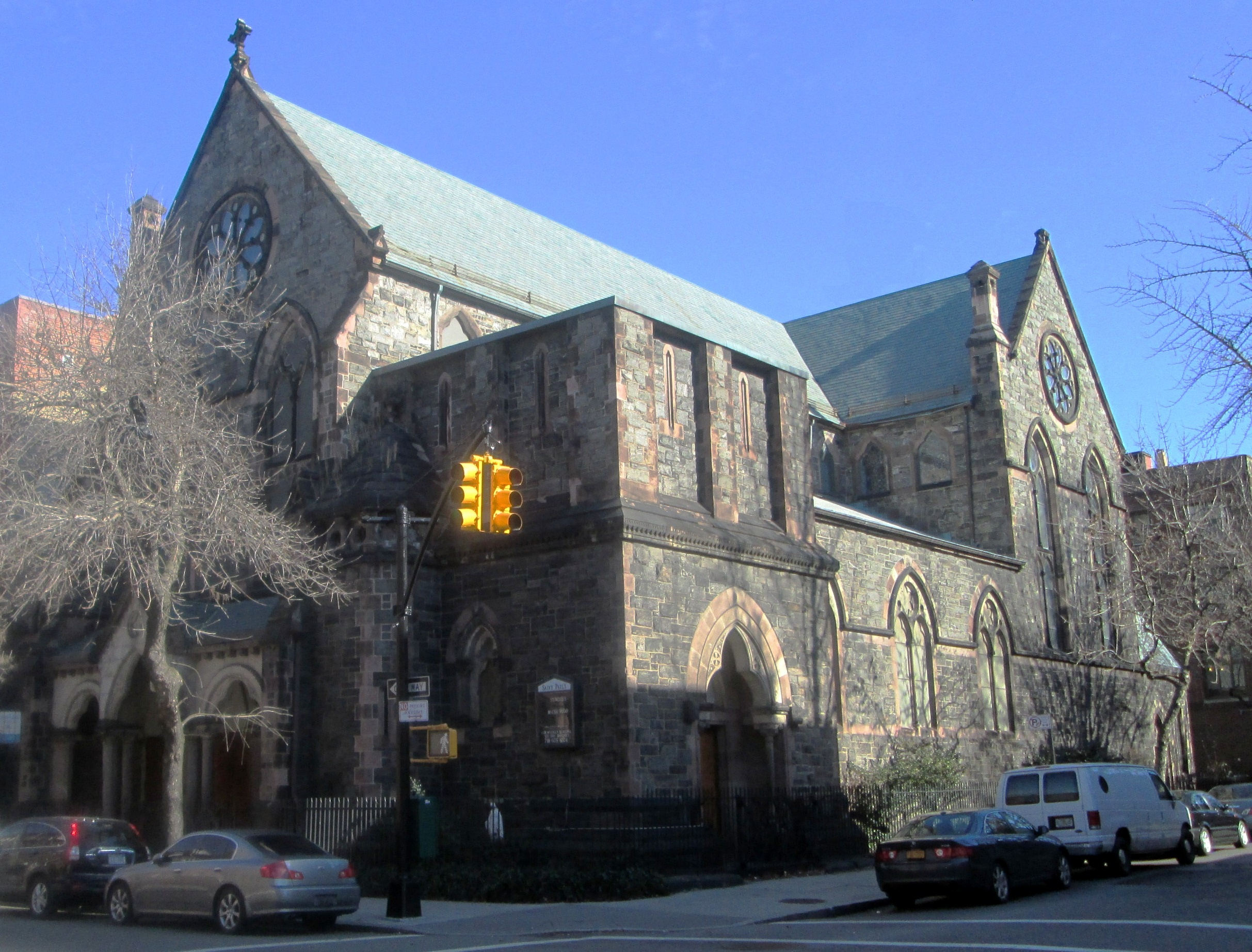
- (2013)

- Location within New York City Location within New York Location within the United States
- Location: 423 Clinton Street; Brooklyn, New York City
- Coordinates: 40.68172°N 73.99803°W
- Built: 1867-1884
- Architect: Richard Upjohn & Son; Ralph Adams Cram
- Architectural style: High Victorian Gothic
- NRHP reference No.: 89002086
- NYSRHP No.: 04701.000455

Significant dates
- Added to NRHP: December 21, 1989
- Designated NYSRHP: October 26, 1989

St. Paul's Episcopal Church of Brooklyn at 423 Clinton Street at Carroll Street in the Carroll Gardens neighborhood of Brooklyn, New York City was built from 1867 to 1884 and was designed by Richard Upjohn & Son in the High Victorian Gothic style. It was added to the National Register of Historic Places in 1989.

The parish is part of the Episcopal Church in the United States of America in the Episcopal Diocese of Long Island, part of the worldwide Anglican Communion, in the Anglo-Catholic tradition. The church reported 609 members in 2022 and 486 members in 2023; no membership statistics were reported in 2024 parochial reports. Plate and pledge income reported for the congregation in 2024 was $565,545 with average Sunday attendance (ASA) of 184 persons.

== Parish history ==
St. Paul's was founded on Christmas Day of 1849, in South Brooklyn, then the quickly developing southward expansion of old Brooklyn Heights. New homes and businesses were covering old countryside, farmland, and shoreline; industrialization was bringing a new way of life to the City of Brooklyn, waves of immigrants from the nations of the world were arriving and the American Civil War was looming. This was also the era when the Anglican Communion of Churches was experiencing a renewed vision of their catholic faith and order often called the "Anglo-Catholic Revival" of the Oxford Movement. Saint Paul's was formed in heady days of philosophical, social, economic, and religious change.
