= The Dream Eaters =

American musical duo

- Origin: Brooklyn, New York City, U.S.
- Genres: Dream pop, art pop, indie pop
- Years active: 2015–present
- Label: Song Dynasty
- Members: Elizabeth LeBaron; Jake Zavracky
- Website: thedreameaters.com

The Dream Eaters are an American indie art-pop duo formed in Brooklyn, New York, in 2015. The band consists of vocalists Elizabeth LeBaron and Jake Zavracky. While initially recognized for their atmospheric dream pop sound, the project has evolved into a multimedia video art project known for its dark, surrealist humor and "noir-pop" aesthetic.

== History ==
=== Formation and early years (2015–2016) ===
The Dream Eaters was formed after Elizabeth LeBaron (originally from Calgary, Canada) and Jake Zavracky (a veteran of the Boston and New York City music scenes) met while working as bartenders in the Gowanus neighborhood of Brooklyn. Zavracky had previously fronted the hard rock band Quick Fix and the synth-pop project the Cyanide Valentine.

The duo briefly performed under the name "Jake and Elizabeth" before adopting the moniker The Dream Eaters. They released their debut EP, Five Little Pills, on June 23, 2016, which established their signature style of ethereal vocal harmonies layered over minimalist production.

=== We Are a Curse and Pagan Love (2017–2020) ===
On April 14, 2017, the band released their first full-length album, We Are a Curse, featuring the singles "Neanderthals" and "Dead on the Inside". The album was noted for its use of Beach Boys-style vocal layering applied to melancholic and sometimes macabre lyrical themes.

Their second album, Pagan Love, was released in 2018. During this period, the band began to lean more heavily into visual media, creating stylized music videos that complemented their "the Carpenters meet Slayer" self-description.

=== Video art and The Dream Eating Freakshow (2021–present) ===
During the COVID-19 pandemic, the duo shifted focus toward a multimedia "video art" format. They launched The Dream Eating Freakshow, a YouTube and TikTok-based sketch series featuring short songs, surrealist skits, and darkly comedic visual art. This era saw the release of several viral singles, including "I Am the Antichrist" and "I Am Bleeding Internally". In 2024, they released the album We Are the Dream Eaters, which compiled many of their short-form musical experiments into a cohesive project.

== Musical style ==
The Dream Eaters' music is characterized by the contrast between LeBaron's sweet, soprano vocals and Zavracky's often cynical, nihilistic, or absurdist lyrics. Their sound draws from 1960s pop, new wave, and shoegaze, frequently incorporating elements of dark comedy. Critics have compared their aesthetic to the films of David Lynch and the sketch comedy of Tim and Eric Awesome Show, Great Job!

== Members ==
- Elizabeth LeBaron – vocals, art direction
- Jake Zavracky – vocals, songwriting, guitar, keyboards, production

== Discography ==
=== Studio albums ===
- We Are a Curse (2017)
- Pagan Love (2018)
- 2015-2020 (2020)
- Disposable Music: Songs From the Dream Eating Freakshow (2022)
- We Are the Dream Eaters (2024)
- Year End Report (2025)

=== EPs ===
- Five Little Pills (2016)

=== Selected singles ===
- CRUCIFIXXX (2024)
- I'm Not In Right Now (2024)
- Subhuman (2024)
- I Am Bleeding Internally (2024)
- I Am the Antichrist (2025)
- Everyone Agrees (2026)
