= Brooklyn Community Board 6 =

Brooklyn Community District 6
- Community District
- Country: United States
- State: New York
- City: New York City
- Borough: Brooklyn
- Neighborhoods: List: Carroll Gardens; Cobble Hill; Columbia Street Waterfront District; Gowanus; Park Slope; Red Hook

Government
  - Chairperson: Eric McClure
  - District Manager: Michael Racioppo

Area
  - Total: 3.1 sq mi (8.0 km^{2})

Population (2010)
  - Total: 104,709
  - Density: 34,000/sq mi (13,000/km^{2})

Ethnicity
  - African-American: 6.7%
  - Asian: 6.6%
  - Hispanic and Latino Americans: 17.3%
  - White: 64.6%
  - Others: 4.7%
- Time zone: UTC−5 (Eastern)
  - Summer (DST): UTC−4 (EDT)
- ZIP codes: 11201, 11215, 11217 and 11231
- Area code: 718, 347, 929, and 917
- Police Precincts: 76th (website); 78th (website)
- Website: www1.nyc.gov/site/brooklyncb6/index.page

Brooklyn Community Board 6 is a New York City community board that encompasses the Brooklyn neighborhoods of Red Hook, Carroll Gardens, Park Slope, Gowanus, Cobble Hill and Columbia Street Waterfront District. It is delimited by Upper New York Bay and East River on the west, Atlantic Avenue, Court Street, Fourth Avenue, Warren and Pacific Streets on the north, Prospect Park on the east, as well as by the 15th Street, Hamilton Avenue and the Gowanus Canal on the south. It approximates the 19th century district of South Brooklyn.

Its current chairman is Eric McClure and the District Manager is Michael Racioppo.

As of the United States Census, 2000, the Community Board has a population of 104,054, up from 102,724 in 1990 but down from 110,225 in 1980.
Of them (as of 2000), 57,106 (54.9%) are White non Hispanic, 14,034 (13.5%) are African-American, 4,622 (4.4%) Asian or Pacific Islander, 173 (0.2%) American Indian or Native Alaskan, 493 (0.5%) of some other race, 3,274 (3.1%) of two or more race, 24,352 (23.4%) of Hispanic origins.
18.8% of the population benefit from public assistance as of 2004, up from 14.4% in 2000. The land area is 2,226.4 acres (9.010 km^{2}).
