= South Congregational Church (Brooklyn) =

Church in Brooklyn, New York

- South Congregational Church (Former)
- U.S. National Register of Historic Places
- New York State Register of Historic Places
- New York City Landmark
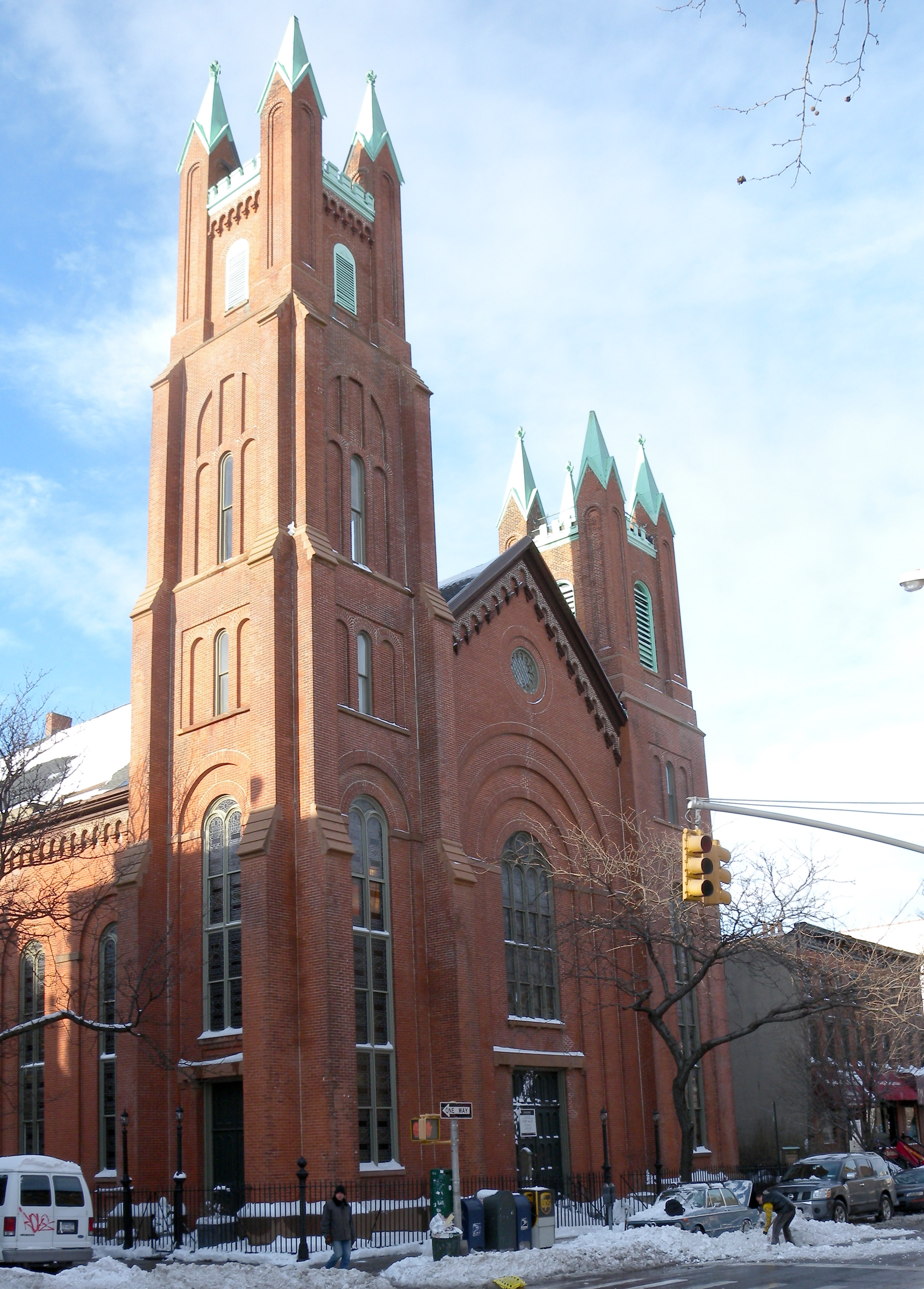
- The former South Congregational Church of Brooklyn

- Location within New York City Location within New York Location within the United States
- Location: President and Court Sts., Brooklyn, New York
- Coordinates: 40°40′55″N 73°59′47″W
- Area: less than one acre
- Built: 1851, 1857, 1889, 1893
- Architect: ?, ?, F.C. Merry, and Woodruff Leeming
- Architectural style: Romanesque Revival architecture
- NRHP reference No.: 82001183
- NYSRHP No.: 04701.002502
- NYCL No.: 1245

Significant dates
- Added to NRHP: November 4, 1982
- Designated NYSRHP: September 30, 1982
- Designated NYCL: March 23, 1982

The South Congregational Church is a former Congregational and United Church of Christ church building complex located on the intersection of Court and President Streets in Carroll Gardens, Brooklyn, New York City. The complex consisting of a church, original chapel, ladies parlor, and rectory was designated a city landmark by the New York City Landmarks Preservation Commission on March 23, 1982. It was added to the National Register of Historic Places on November 4, 1982.

The chapel was built 1851 and the church in 1857. The ladies parlor was built in 1889 to designs by English-American architect Frederick Charles Merry (d.1900) and the rectory building in 1893 to designs by architect Woodruff Leeming. The church is noteworthy as one of Brooklyn's finest examples of the Early Romanesque Revival architectural style. The designers of the chapel and church remain unknown. In 1874, the Rev. Dr. Albert Josiah Lyman became pastor, and served for 41 years.

The location is believed to have been selected by the famous preacher and abolitionist Henry Ward Beecher, brother of author Harriet Beecher Stowe. In the 1980s, as an example of adaptive reuse, the interior of the church complex was converted to apartments and offices.
