= Columbia Street Waterfront District =

Neighborhood in Brooklyn, New York City

Coordinates: 40°41′8.71″N 74°0′45.4″W

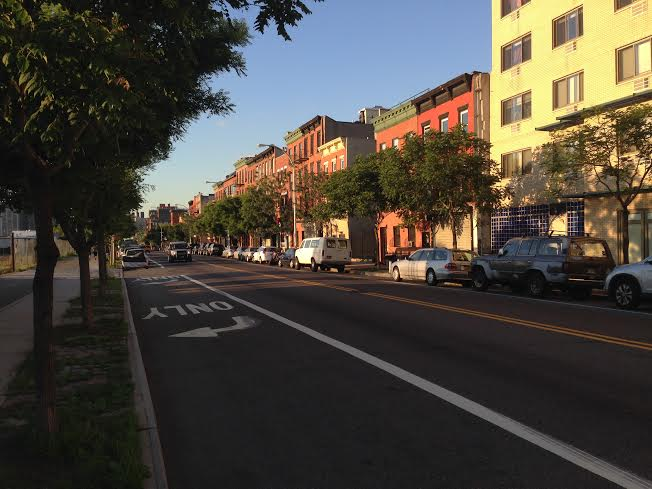
Columbia Street

Location in New York City

The Columbia Street Waterfront District is a neighborhood in the borough of Brooklyn in New York City on the Upper New York Bay waterfront between Cobble Hill and Red Hook and situated on the western side of the Brooklyn–Queens Expressway (BQE). The neighborhood is locally governed by Brooklyn Community Board 6. The neighborhood was formed in 1957 when the newly built BQE effectively cut Columbia Street off from Carroll Gardens and Cobble Hill, its two adjacent neighborhoods. The district, once an area that was blighted by empty storefronts, was further emptied of tenants by a 1975 accident while a sewer line was being repaired that caused the death of a construction worker and the demolition of 33 buildings. By 1984, an urban renewal project was completed, as well as a brand-new street, houses along which sold out quickly.

Throughout the 2000s, new bakeries, restaurants and businesses began opening in the neighborhood, including Alma, a Mexican eatery and Pok Pok, a Thai restaurant at 127 Columbia Street that ultimately closed in 2018.

The district is one of Brooklyn's smallest neighborhoods, comprising about 22 blocks in an area west–east between the B.Q.E. and the waterfront, and north–south from Atlantic Avenue to the Hugh L. Carey Tunnel. It is sometimes described as part of Carroll Gardens or Cobble Hill.

Eleven percent of the population along the northern section of Columbia Street is unmarried, same-sex households, which is the largest percentage of same-sex relationships anywhere in New York City.
