= Carroll Gardens Historic District =

Historic district in Brooklyn, New York

- U.S. National Register of Historic Places
- U.S. Historic district
- New York State Register of Historic Places
- New York City Landmark
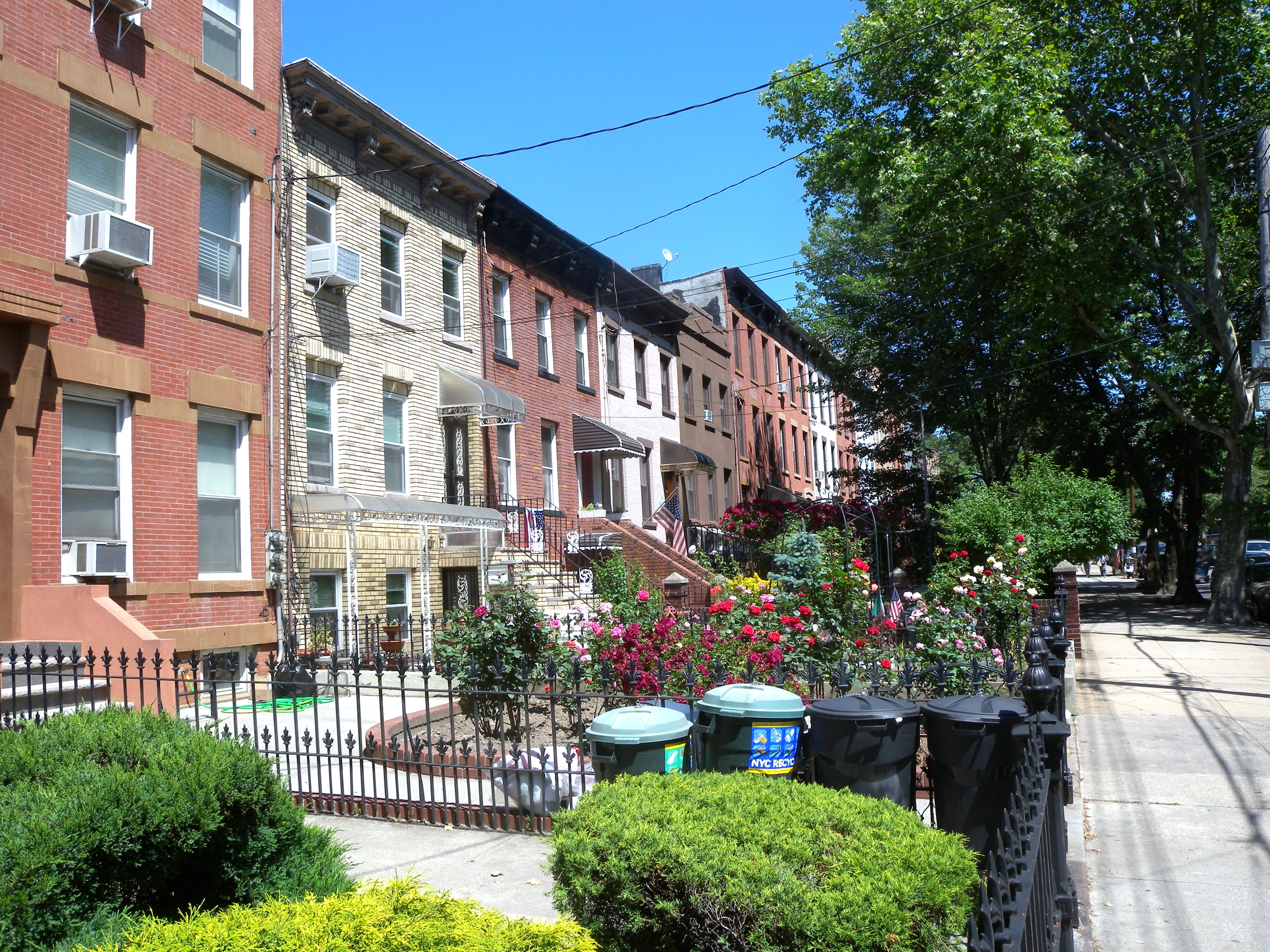
- Brownstones with large front gardens are typical in the historic district

- Location within New York City Location within New York Location within the United States
- Location: bounded by Carroll, President, Smith, and Hoyt Streets; Brooklyn, New York City
- Coordinates: 40°40′47″N 73°59′25″W
- Area: 12 acres (4.9 ha)
- Built: 1869-1884
- Architectural style: Italianate, Neo-Grec, etc.
- NRHP reference No.: 83001687
- NYCL No.: 0696

Significant dates
- Added to NRHP: September 26, 1983
- Designated NYSRHP: August 3, 1983
- Designated NYCL: September 25, 1973

The Carroll Gardens Historic District is a small municipal and national historic district located in the Carroll Gardens neighborhood of Brooklyn, New York City. The national district consists of 134 contributing residential rowhouses built between the 1860s and 1880s. They are two- and three-story brownstone buildings in the neo-Grec and late Italianate styles located in a rectangle bounded by Carroll, President, Smith, and Hoyt Streets. They feature uniform setbacks, even cornice lines and stoop levels, and fenced front yards and landscaped gardens. These were the result of surveyor Richard Butt, who in 1846 planned gardens in front of the brownstone houses in the oldest section of the neighborhood. The homes are set farther back from the street than is common in Brooklyn, and the large gardens became an iconic depiction of the neighborhood. All the houses in the district, which is afforded a degree of privacy by the street pattern that discourages through traffic on Carroll and President Streets, were built between 1869 and 1884.

The district was designated a New York City landmark by the New York City Landmarks Preservation Commission in 1973, and was listed on the National Register of Historic Places in 1983.

== See also ==
- List of New York City Landmarks
- National Register of Historic Places listings in New York County, New York
