= Nicole Beland =

American journalist

Nicole Beland was the Men's Health "Girl Next Door" until the May 2009 issue. Beland's column from Men's Health has been converted into a book called Ask the Men's Health Girl Next Door (ISBN 1579547125). She attended Union College in Schenectady, NY.

She also contributed to its sister publication, Women's Health, as a Deputy Editor, until she left to work at Cosmopolitan as Executive Editor. Along with Ted Spiker, Beland contributed to an advice column on the Women's Health website. A former senior editor at Cosmopolitan and Mademoiselle magazines, she currently lives in Carroll Gardens, Brooklyn.

She is also the author of several books including The Cocktail Jungle: A Girl's Field Guide to Shaking and Stirring (2003), Girl Seeks Bliss (2005), and Sex: The Whole Picture (2005). She has appeared as a health and relationships expert on CNN Headline News, The Early Show, Good Morning America, The Today Show, and The Best Damn Sports Show Period.

== Articles for Women's Health ==
- "A Girl Walks into a Bar", Fall 2004
- "Are You on the Right Pill?", February/March 2005
- "The Pursuit of Happiness", April/May 2005
