= Ma Beland =

American criminal (1870–1941)

Lucy Beland
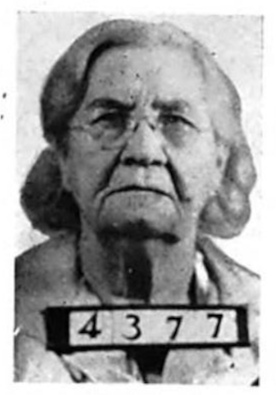
- Mugshot of Ma Beland
- Born: Lucille Pounds; November 4, 1870; Georgia, United States
- Died: December 30, 1952 (aged 82); United States
- Organization: Beland crime family
- Known for: Narcotics trafficking
- Status: Deceased
- Penalty: Multiple prison sentences

Lucy Beland (November 4, 1870 – December 30, 1952), also known as Ma Beland, was an American criminal. Based in Fort Worth, Texas, she and her children sold narcotics, including morphine, cocaine and heroin. Beland was often cast as the leader of the Beland crime family, whose members were convicted of narcotics crimes at least 30 times from 1921 to 1947.

== Early life and family ==
Lucille Pounds was born in Georgia on November 4, 1870. She married Joseph Henry Beland (1862–1925) around 1891 and they had a son, George (c. 1891–1964). They moved to Johnson County, Texas, living in Cleburne and later Grandview where her husband worked at Grandview Cotton Oil Mill. They had five more children, Willie (c. 1896–1956), Cora (1898–1917), Charles (1900–1955), Joe Jr. (c. 1903–1951), and Annice (1904–1963). With the exception of George, all of the children would later be convicted of narcotics charges.

In 1908, the Beland family moved from Grandview to Fort Worth, eventually settling in the Arlington Heights neighborhood. Joe Sr. and George worked as machinists for the railroad. Joseph was described in newspapers as "a serious-minded, hard working provider." In 1911, their son Charles, then 10 years old, stabbed another boy and was charged with assault but later released on probation. Later that year, their daughter Willie, then 15, was caught as part of a shoplifting ring of a dozen girls. Police later said that Lucy had organized a shoplifting school for her daughters, with their brothers posing as store detectives. Willie and Cora were arrested for shoplifting from department stores in 1912. Willie was arrested again in 1912 for possession of cocaine and in 1913 for stealing dresses. Willie and Cora were charged with theft again in 1914. Willie was later quoted in the Star-Telgram as saying that she was 12 years old when she first tried morphine, then costing twenty-five cents for "a big bottle".

== Narcotics and prison ==
Following the passage of the Harrison Narcotics Tax Act of 1914, Beland's daughters Cora and Willie sold morphine. Newspaper accounts reported that Lucy had forced the two into prostitution, serving as their "madam". The daughters were in and out of jail in 1915 and both were reportedly addicted to drugs. Cora died in jail in 1917, following an overdose of morphine that law enforcement later said had been smuggled to her. Beland's son Charles was convicted of theft in 1918. He was then brought up on narcotics charges and sent to Leavenworth Federal Penitentiary for a five-year term. Her son Joe Jr. was also involved with narcotics while George was arrested when he was young for theft, but apparently did not join the family business.

From 1921 to 1947, members of the Beland family were convicted of narcotics crimes at least 30 times. In August 1921, Lucy Beland was arrested for conspiracy to violate the Harrison Act twice in three weeks. Joe Jr., Willie and Annice were also arrested. Beland was charged with selling morphine and had marked bills in her possession. In comments made to the Fort Worth Record in 1923, Joe Sr. said that "while little girls in school my daughters were led into the dope habit by a man who is now dead... Their mother used to whip the girls when she found them full of dope, but it did no good." Joe Sr. died in 1925. He was later described in a Bureau of Narcotics document as "a respectable citizen who died many years ago, reportedly of a broken heart caused by the depredations of his wife and children."

On November 30, 1926, Beland was sentenced to one year and one day in prison. Her sons, Charles and Joseph, were each sentenced to two years in Leavenworth. Beland later said of the sentence that she "could have done it standing on my head."

== Later life ==
In 1938, narcotics agents purchased and seized 2.3 kilograms of illicit drugs from the Beland gang. Lucy, Willie, Joe Jr., Charles, Jacqueline Beland, and Leslie James were all arrested. On December 8, 1938, Beland was sentenced to two years and convicted of conspiracy to violate the Harrison Narcotics Act alongside Joe Jr., Jacqueline Beland, and Elizabeth Stonehocker. The crime family was the subject of a December 1938 article in The American Magazine which described how Beland had taught her daughters how to shoplift in a "crime school".

After the Federal Bureau of Narcotics under Harry J. Anslinger arrested the Texas-based Ginsberg-Kayne-Gordon criminal syndicate in 1936, the Belands were able to take over international trafficking. Charles Beland had contacts involved in organized crime in Mexico through which he acquired illegal drugs. It is not known if the Beland family's supply of heroin came from Lola la Chata, a contemporary Mexican drug trafficker.

The Beland family continued to be involved in narcotics, with Charles Beland being described in 1951 as having been "the biggest narcotics peddler in the Southwest." Beland's daughter Annice was convicted of a narcotics charge in 1947.

Ma Beland died on December 30, 1952.

== See also ==
- Ma Barker
