= Church of the Sacred Hearts of Jesus and Mary & St. Stephen (Brooklyn) =

Former Roman Catholic parish and church in New York

Coordinates: 40.68546°N 74.00092°W

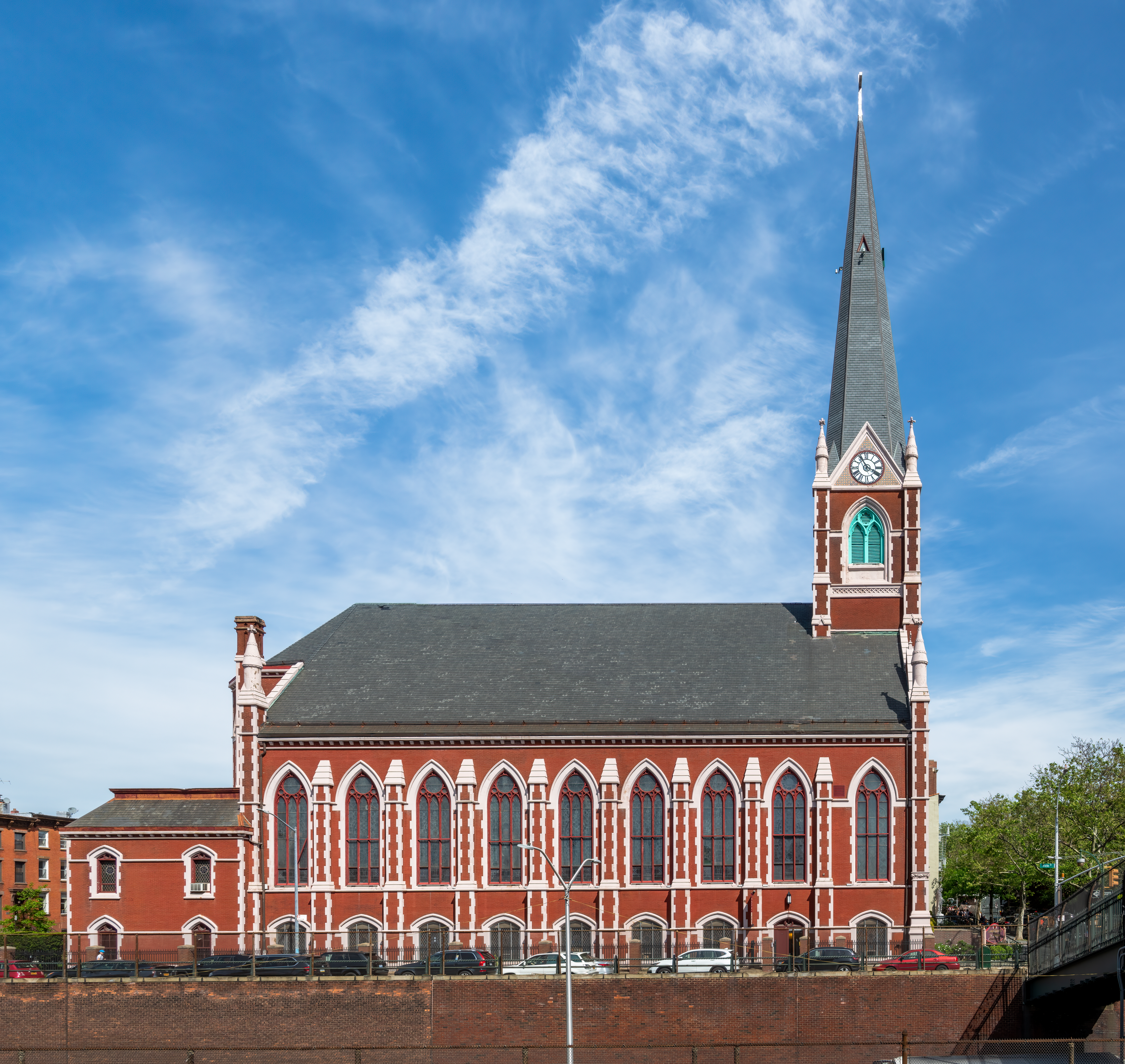
- Interactive map of the Church of the Sacred Hearts of Jesus and Mary & St. Stephen area

General information
- Architectural style: Gothic Revival
- Location: Brooklyn, New York, United States of America
- Construction started: 1900
- Completed: 1882, 1885, 1906, 1941
- Demolished: 1942
- Client: The Roman Catholic Diocese of Brooklyn

Technical details
- Structural system: Brick masonry

The Church of the Sacred Hearts of Mary and Jesus and St. Stephen was a former Roman Catholic parish and church, that was located in Brooklyn, New York, in the United States. The parish was established on December 7, 1941, with the merger of the earlier territorial parish of St. Stephen with the Italian national parish of the Sacred Hearts of Jesus and Mary, necessitated by the demolition of Sacred Hearts due to construction of the Brooklyn–Queens Expressway.

== History ==
On January 10, 1951, a five-alarm fire almost completely destroyed the seventy-five year old building; the restored church reopened in early 1952.

=== St. Stephen ===
In 1866 Father O.J. Dorris purchased a small frame Episcopal church on Carroll Street, and Bishop Loughlin dedicated it in honor of St. Stephen. Six years later, Rev. E.J. O'Peilly began the construction of a new church at the corner of Hicks and Summit. It was designed by Patrick Keely, and dedicated by Bishop Loughlin in 1875. For several years, the spire was illuminated at night and served as a beacon for mariners entering New York Bay. The old church was converted to a school under the care of the Sisters of Charity. A new school was opened in 1908. In 1913, parishioners presented the church with four statues of Carrera marble depicting Ss. Stephen, Joseph, Mary, and the Sacred Heart.

=== Church of the Sacred Hearts of Mary and Jesus ===
The Catholic Mission of the Italian Colony of the City of Brooklyn was established in 1882 by Fr. Joseph Fransioli (sometimes spelled Francioli) in St. Peter’s Church (corner of Warren and Hicks Streets). It was the first parish established specifically for Italian immigrants on Long Island, many of whom were seafaring men from Sorrento and Procida.

The church was opened in May 1885 on President Street off of Van Brunt Street but by 1900 a new structure was needed. Mother Cabrini came to the parish during this time and in 1892 with her sisters established a school for Italian immigrant children in the parish. This was under the direction of her order. This school, St. Charles' School, was opened within an adaptively reused former Moravian church on Van Brunt Street purchased by Bishop McDonnell of the Diocese of Brooklyn.

Father Vogel completed a new church in 1906 on Degraw and Hicks Streets in, of gray brick trimmed with limestone. Fr. Vogel kept the church on President Street as the Chapel of St. Charles, apparently derived from Mother Cabrini's school. The new church and surrounding buildings were cleared by Robert Moses for the Brooklyn-Queens Expressway. The final mass was celebrated on the morning of December 7, 1941. The congregation merged with the nearby Church of Saint Stephen.

Another Church of the Sacred Hearts of Mary and Jesus (New York City) served Italian-Americans in Kipps Bay, Manhattan.
