= Frederick Carles Merry =

American architect (1837–1900)

- Born: June 16, 1837; Edgbaston, England
- Died: March 4, 1900 (aged 62); New York City, New York
- Other names: F. C. Merry, F. Carles Merry
- Occupation: Architect

Frederick Carles Merry, AIA, (June 16, 1837 – March 4, 1900) was an American architect active in late-nineteenth-century New York City.

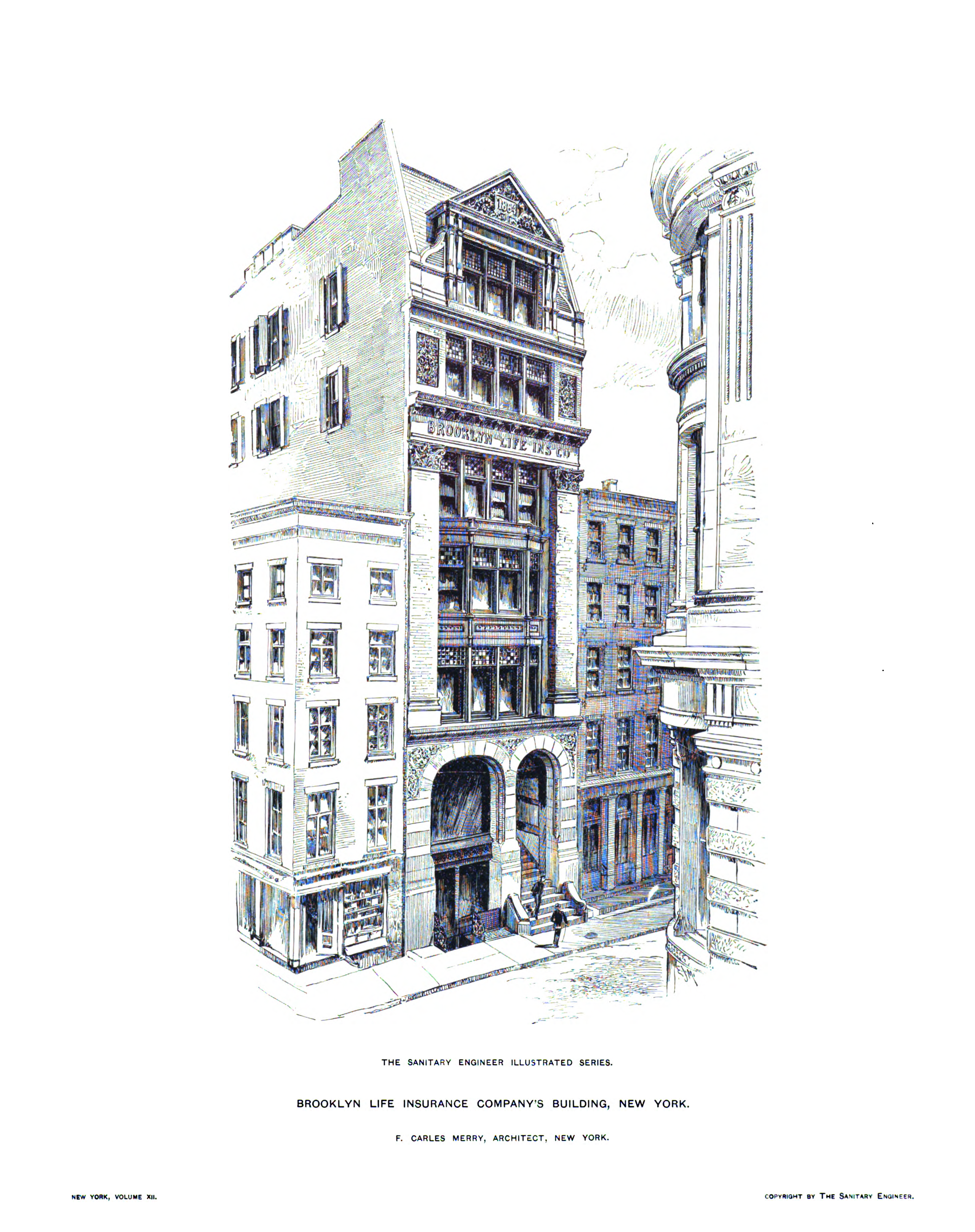
Brooklyn Life Insurance Building, New York City

Merry was born in Edgbaston, near Birmingham in England, and emigrated to the United States when he was ten years old. The family settled in Camden, New Jersey where his father became owner of a chemical works. He worked for an architectural firm in Philadelphia before becoming principal assistant in the New York City office of Henry Hobson Richardson's architectural firm. Between 1861 and 1865 he was in practice with James C. Sidney, and during this period worked on Fairmount Park in Philadelphia. From 1866 he had an office in Philadelphia, and by 1869 was working in New York City.

Per Lisa B. Mauusolf's 1983 Master's Thesis at Columbia University, "A Catalog of the Work of George B. Post, Architect," Merry appears in the salary lists for Post's architectural office as early as 1866. Merry is listed as principal draftsman for Post in 1870 and supervised many projects for Post. His increasingly significant position in the Post office is reflected in the fact that he received a cut of the profits in 1873. Merry left the Post firm in 1877, according to letterpress correspondence in the Post firm's archives.

In 1877 he travelled to Canada to assist with designs for reconstruction after the disastrous 1877 Great Fire of Saint John, New Brunswick. In 1879 he entered a competition for a design for the New Brunswick legislative building, but his design was not chosen. His buildings include: 52-54 8th Avenue, in the Park Slope neighborhood of Brooklyn, New York City (1886); The Brooklyn Life Insurance Building, Liberty Street, New York City (c1885); and the ladies parlour (1889) of the South Congregation Church complex in Brooklyn, New York.
