= South Brooklyn =

Area of New York City

Coordinates: 40.671°N 73.989°W

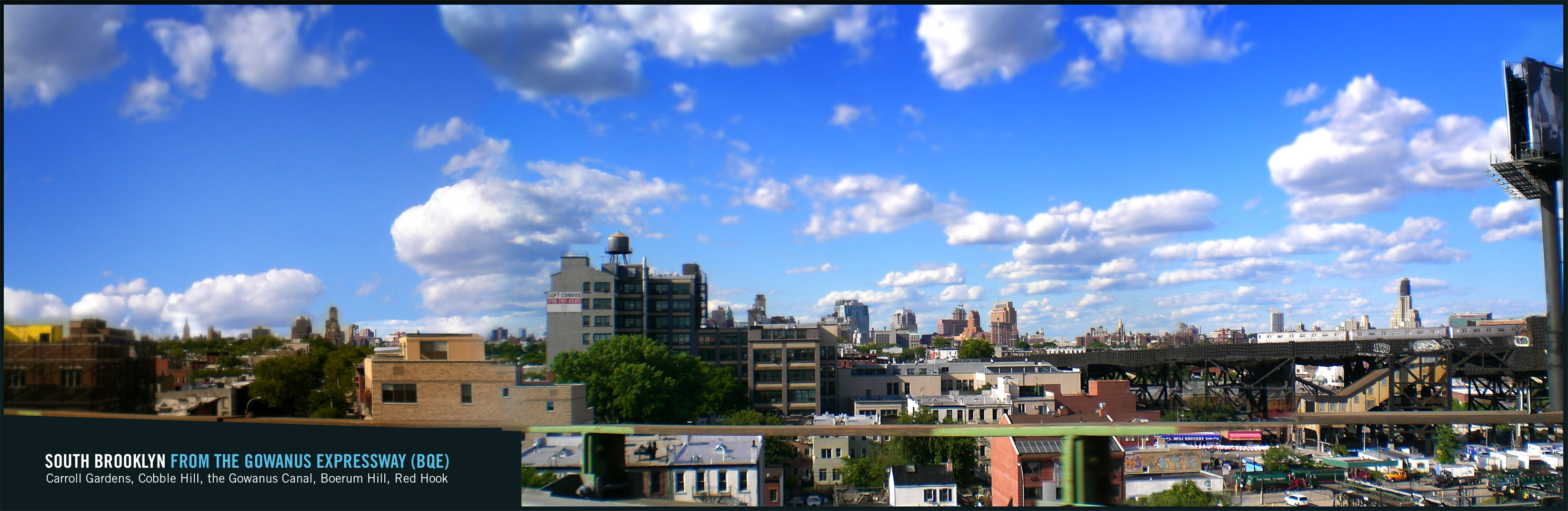
View of South Brooklyn

South Brooklyn is a historic term for a section of the former City of Brooklyn – now the New York City borough of Brooklyn – encompassing what are now the Bay Ridge, Boerum Hill, Carroll Gardens, Cobble Hill, Gowanus, Park Slope, Windsor Terrace, Sunset Park, and Red Hook neighborhoods. It was named for its location along the waterfront that was the southern border of the original Village of Brooklyn, and has remained widely used as a colloquialism despite it no longer being the southernmost point of the borough. It should not be confused with the geographic southern region of the modern borough of Brooklyn, which includes the neighborhoods of Gravesend, Seagate, Coney Island, Brighton Beach, Manhattan Beach, Sheepshead Bay, Gerritsen Beach, Marine Park, Mill Basin, and Bergen Beach.

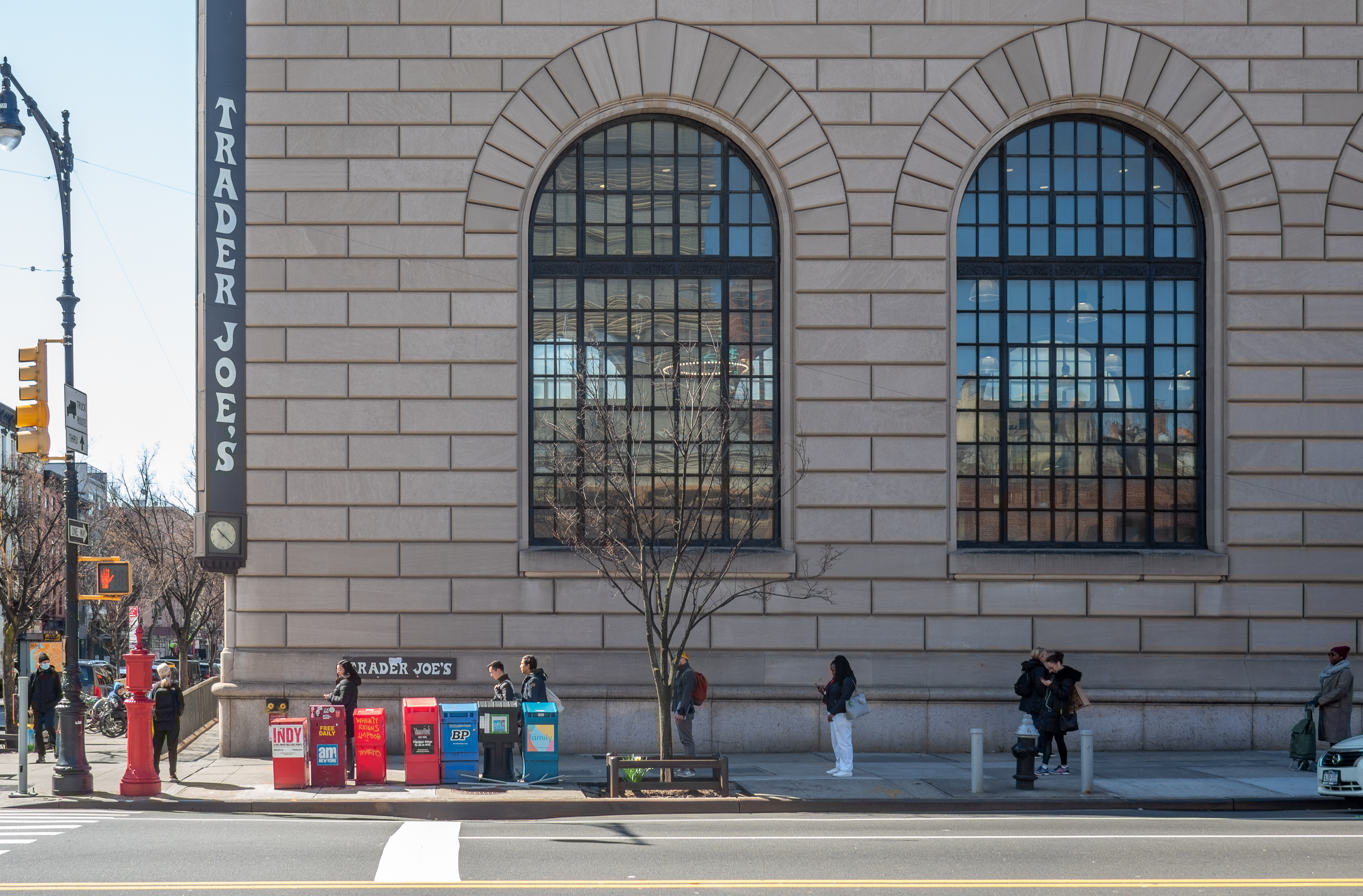
Former South Brooklyn Savings Institution, at the north end of South Brooklyn

"South Brooklyn" or "Southern Brooklyn" is also in use in the modern borough of Brooklyn, but without total consistency as to what it refers to. It has been used about neighborhoods as various and physically separated as Mill Basin, Bensonhurst, Carroll Gardens, Gowanus, Red Hook, Smith Street, Sunset Park, Windsor Terrace, as well as Bay Ridge, Dyker Heights, and Park Slope. (Note: The actual geographical classification of these neighborhoods is as follows: Southeast Brooklyn: Bergen Beach, Marine Park, Mill Basin; Southern Brooklyn: Brighton Beach, Coney Island, Gerritsen Beach, Gravesend, Manhattan Beach, Sea Gate, Sheepshead Bay; Southwest Brooklyn: Bath Beach (and the historical "Bath"), Bensonhurst, Bay Ridge, Dyker Heights; Western Brooklyn (historical "South Brooklyn"): Carroll Gardens, Gowanus, Red Hook, Smith Street, Sunset Park, Windsor Terrace, Park Slope)

== Transportation ==
The New York City Subway's IND Culver Line (F and G trains) serves the area at the Carroll Street and Smith–Ninth Streets stations. The line was originally named the "South Brooklyn Line" on some official subway maps. However, this obsolete name for the Culver Line may have referred to the South Brooklyn Railway, the original right of way of the BMT Culver Line; this right-of-way originally ran between Sunset Park, in the southern part of the former city of Brooklyn, and Coney Island, the southernmost area in the modern borough of Brooklyn.

The B57 and B61 bus routes serve South Brooklyn as well.
