= Gowanus, Brooklyn =

Neighborhood in New York City

Gowanus
- Neighborhood of Brooklyn
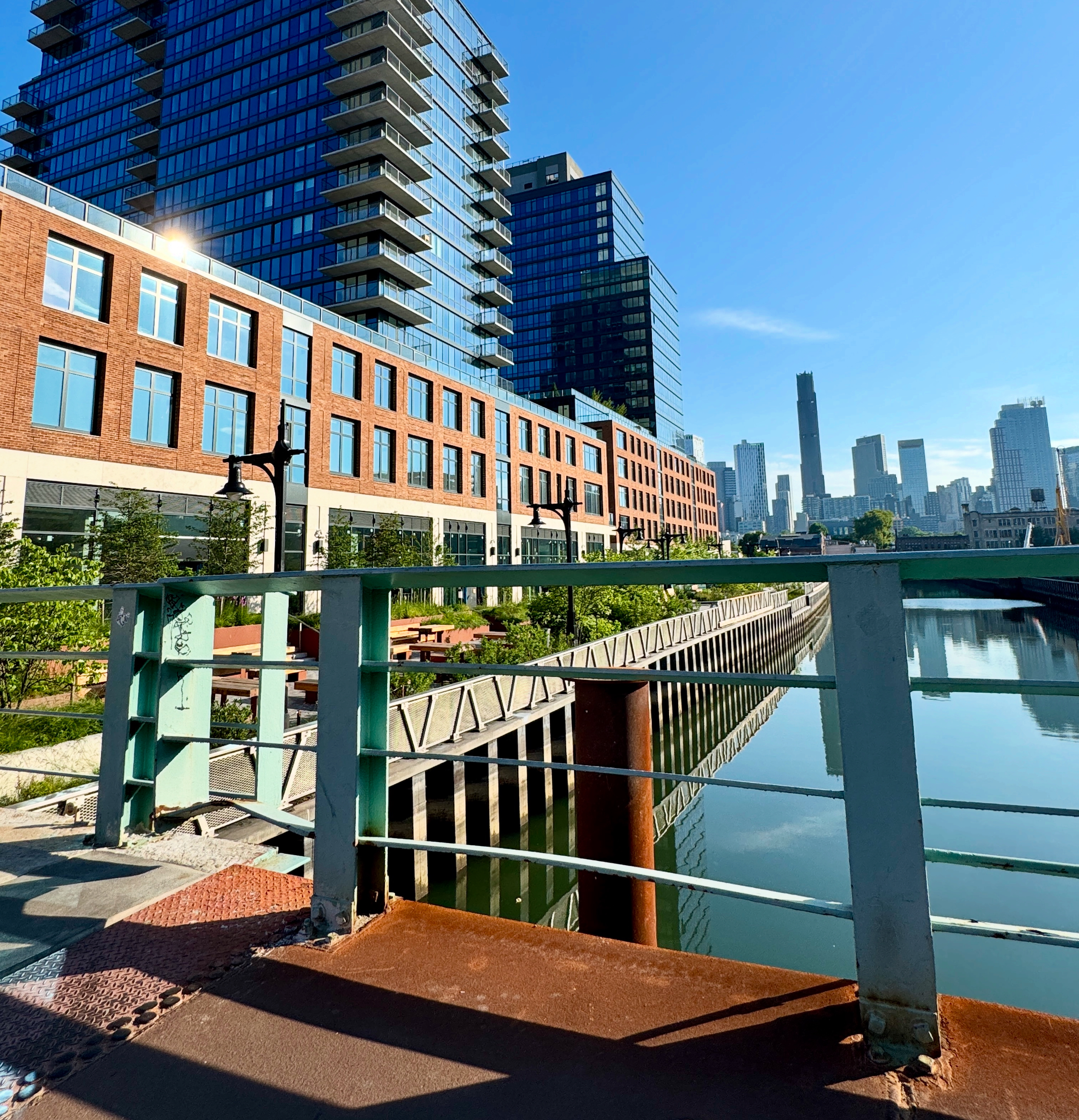
- The Gowanus Canal
- Interactive map of Gowanus
- Coordinates: 40.6753°N 73.9911°W
- Country: United States
- State: New York
- City: New York City
- County/Borough: Brooklyn
- Community District: Brooklyn 6
- Time zone: UTC−5 (Eastern)
  - Summer (DST): UTC−4 (EDT)
- ZIP Code: 11215
- Area codes: 718, 347, 929, and 917

Gowanus (/ɡəˈwɑːnəs/ gə-WAH-nəs) is a neighborhood in the northwestern portion of the New York City borough of Brooklyn, within the area once known as South Brooklyn. The neighborhood is part of Brooklyn Community District 6. Gowanus is bounded by Wyckoff Street on the north, Fourth Avenue on the east, the Gowanus Expressway to the south, and Bond Street to the west.

== History ==
=== 17th to 20th centuries ===
In 1636, Gowanus Bay – named after Gauwane (Gouwane, lit. "the sleeper"), a Canarsee Indian – was the site of the first settlement by Dutch farmers in what is now Brooklyn. The ponds of Gowanus meadowlands served to drive early settlers' tide-powered gristmills which were situated along the Gowanus Creek. During the American Revolutionary War, Gowanus was the scene of fighting in the Battle of Long Island and American soldiers positioned themselves in Gowanus Heights (now Park Slope), where they had full view of the British ships as they made landfall in the Bay.

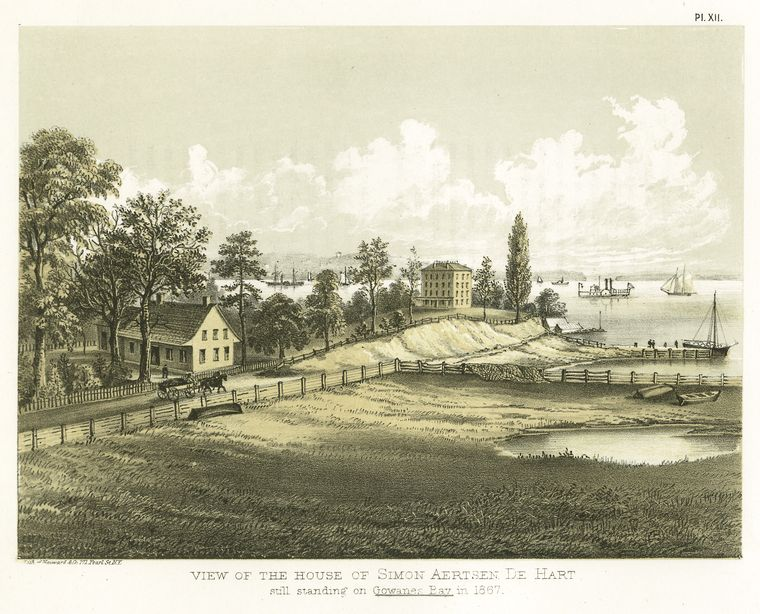
View of the house of Simon Aertsen De Hart, still standing on Gowanus Bay in 1867

In the 1860s, the Gowanus Creek was turned into the Gowanus Canal, and the area became a hub for manufacturing and shipping. As a result of the industry along the canal and the establishment of a combined sewer system that dumped waste water directly into a designated outflow at the head of the canal, the neighborhood came to be defined by the polluted canal. After World War II, the decline of shipping at the port of Red Hook and of manufacturing around New York City prompted large industry to leave and changed the vibrancy of industry in Gowanus. In the late 1940s, the neighborhood became the site of several NYCHA housing projects, which were built in part to house returning WWII veterans.

The water and much of the land along the banks of the Gowanus Canal have been severely polluted by combined sewer outflows (CSOs) along the canal designed to relieve sewage and storm water when the sewer treatment plant is overwhelmed, as well as by decades of industrial use and extensive coal gas manufacturing during the late 19th century. The Gowanus Canal was also an alleged Mafia dumping ground. Even so, in the early 1980s, alongside the canal, an old 19th-century munitions factory at 230 3rd Street in Gowanus became the site of the massive Gowanus Memorial Artyard, whose remains are still visible.

=== 21st century ===
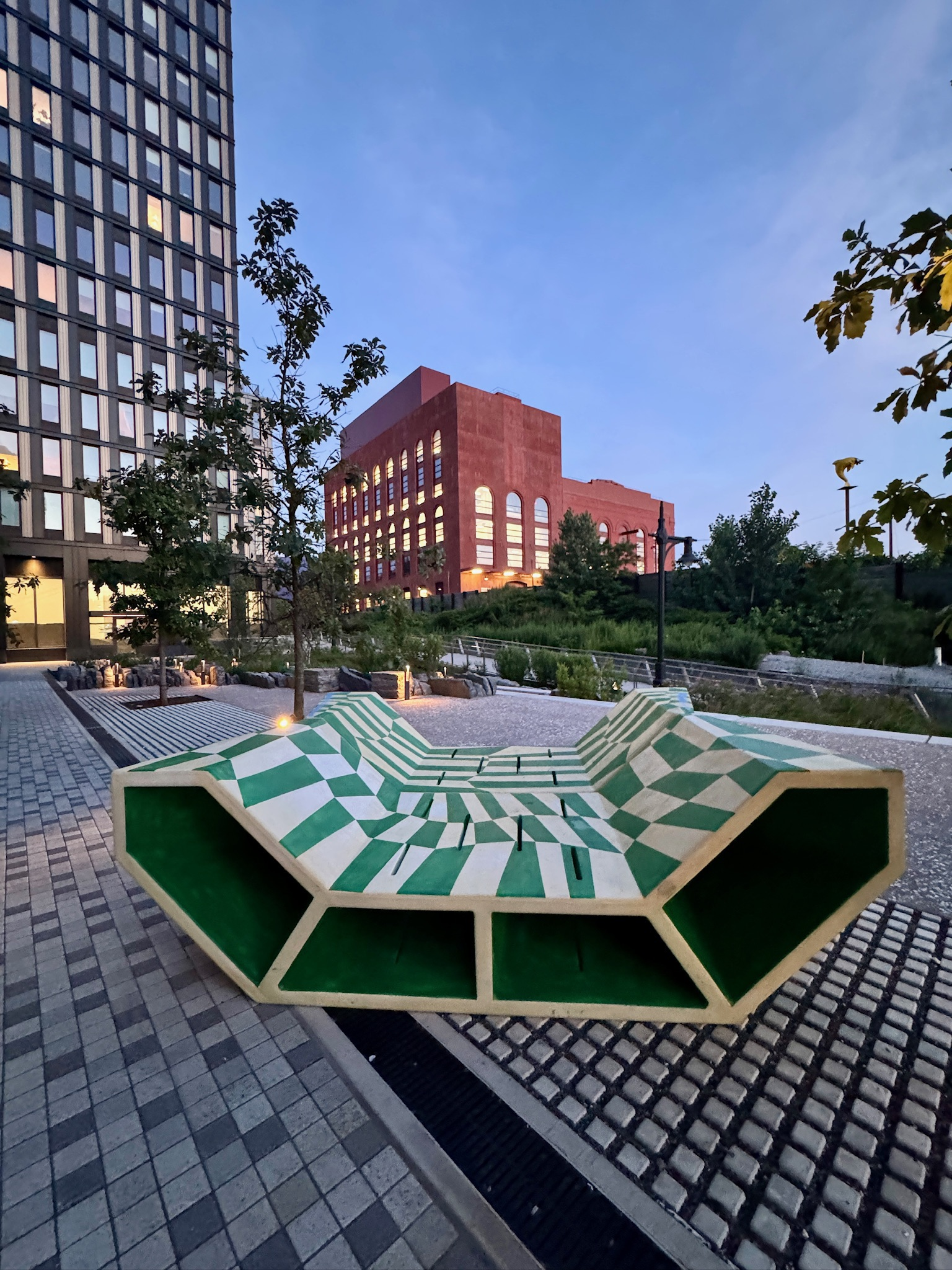
Powerhouse Arts is an arts hub in Gowanus, Brooklyn, housed in a restored century-old power station.

The area was historically zoned for light to mid-level manufacturing. In the first decade of the 21st century, residential developers were hindered by the industrial zoning and the problems of the sewage overflow through the canal water, but there had been rumors of rezoning by the New York City Department of City Planning. Many residents and community groups have expressed concern over the sewage overflow that the rezoning could possibly create. From 2013–2016, the City Planning Department, community groups, business owners, developers, arts organizations, and neighborhood residents participated in a "community planning process" called Bridging Gowanus intended to inform neighborhood rezoning processes with the intention of creating a land-use framework for the neighborhood.

In 2010, the Environmental Protection Agency designated the Gowanus Canal a Superfund site, allocating $506 million for the cleanup of decades of industrial pollution and sewage contamination. The completion date for the cleanup was set for 2022 but later pushed back to 2029.

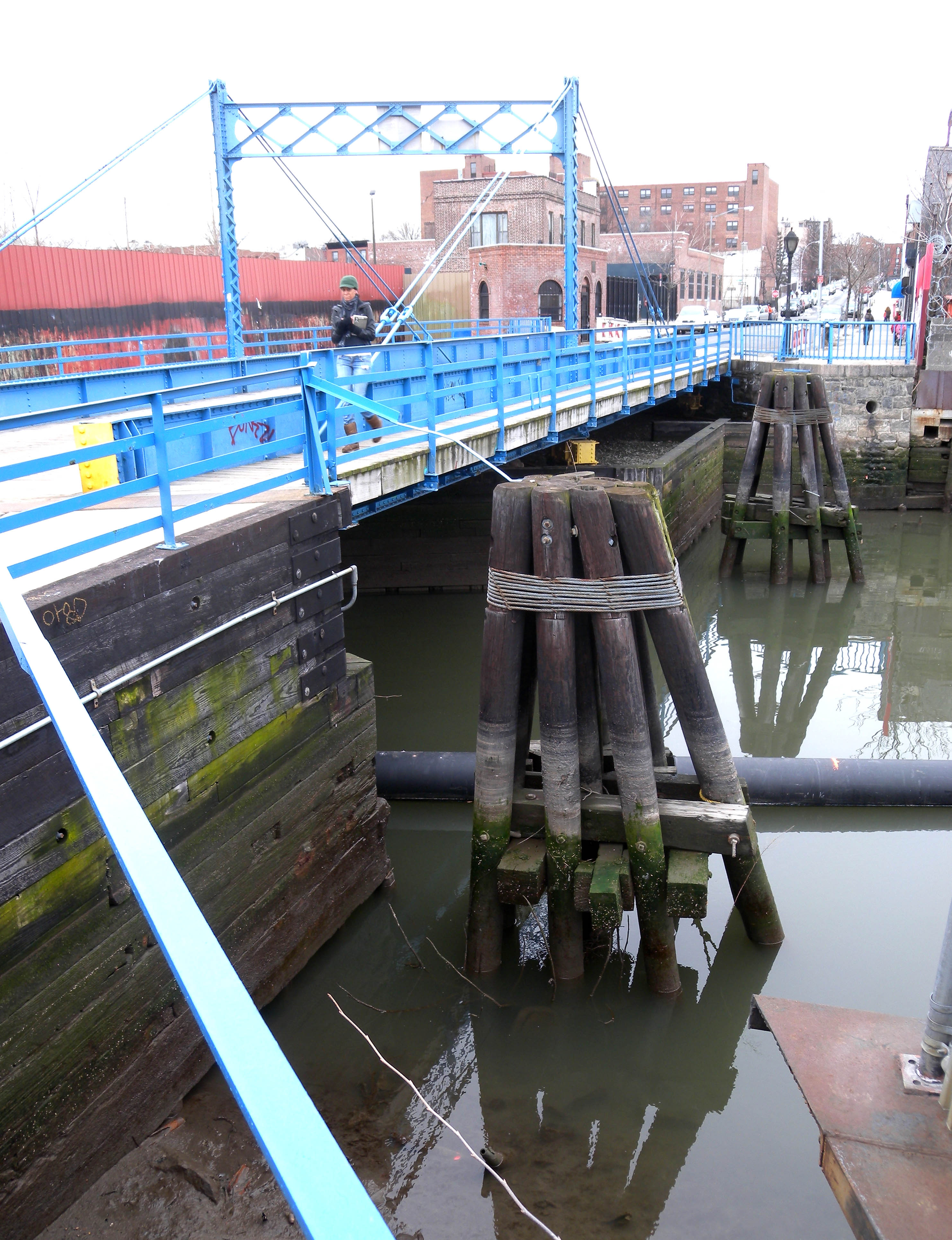
The Carroll Street Bridge, a New York City landmark

Many "coworking" spaces were formed in Gowanus in the 2010s. More restaurants, bars, and art galleries moved to the neighborhood, and new real estate became available.

The area was rezoned in November 2021, allowing more residential buildings to be developed there. The rezoning includes 8,500 new apartments in the area, of which 3,000 are to be affordable. Local businesses and residents formed the Gowanus Improvement District, a business improvement district, in 2024. By the mid-2020s, numerous apartment buildings were being built in Gowanus along the canal.

== Transportation ==
On the New York City Subway, the D, N, R, and W trains on the BMT Fourth Avenue Line and the F, <F>, and G trains on the IND Culver Line run through Gowanus, with stations at Smith–Ninth Streets and Fourth Avenue/Ninth Street. The neighborhood is also served by the B37, B57, B61 and B103 bus routes. Bike routes cross the canal on the Union Street, 3rd Street and 9th Street bridges. The elevated Gowanus Expressway runs through the southern edge of the neighborhood, crossing the canal at Hamilton Avenue. The Carroll Street Bridge, built in 1889, is the oldest of the four remaining retractable bridges in the country.
