= Smith–Ninth Streets station =

New York City Subway station in Brooklyn

Smith–9 Streets
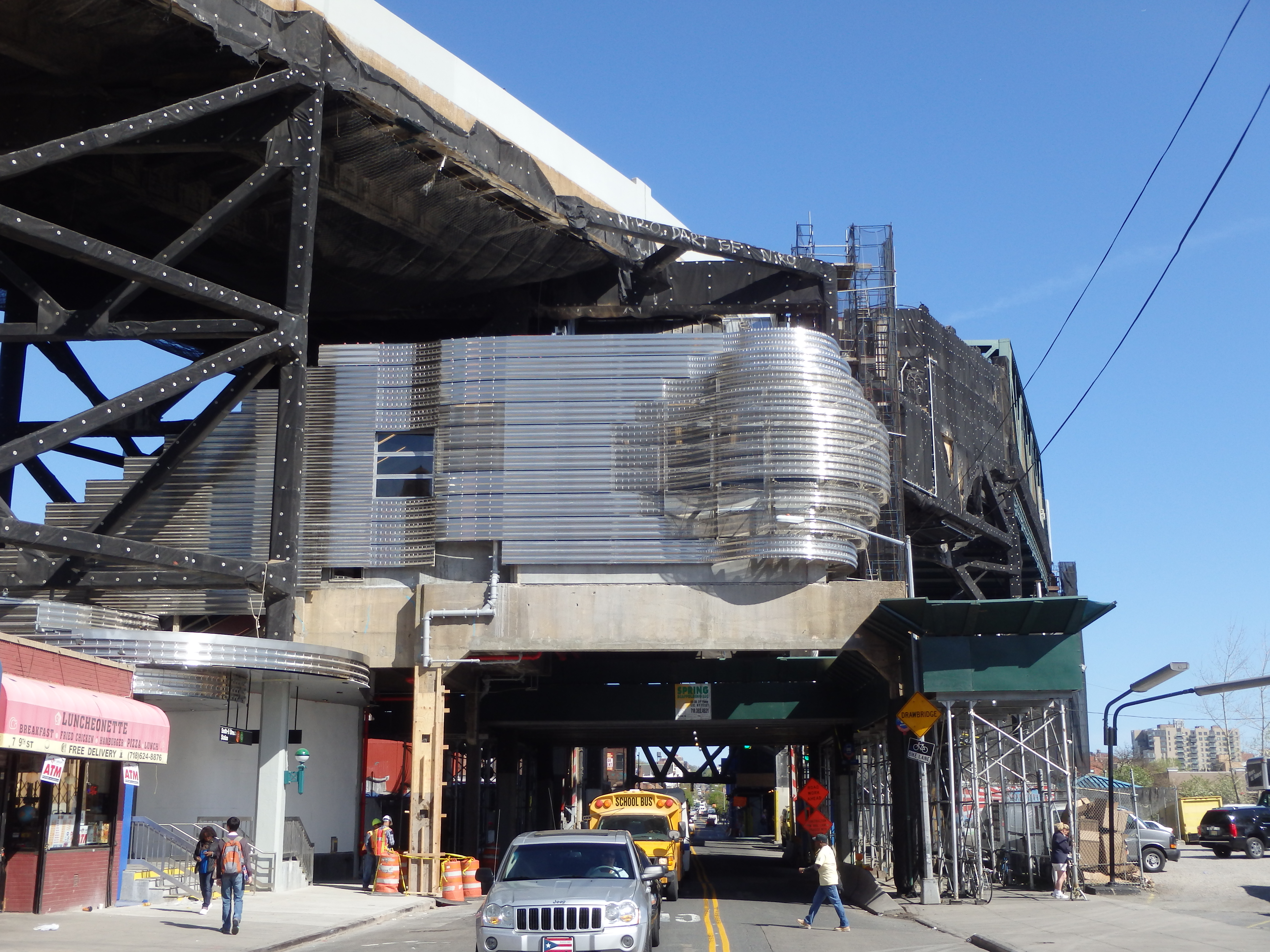
- Station view from street level

Station statistics
- Address: Smith Street & Ninth Street; Brooklyn, New York
- Borough: Brooklyn
- Locale: Gowanus
- Coordinates: 40°40′28″N 73°59′50″W
- Division: B (IND)
- Line: IND Culver Line
- Services: F (all times); G (all times)
- Transit: NYCT Bus: B57, B61
- Structure: Elevated
- Platforms: 2 side platforms
- Tracks: 4

Other information
- Opened: October 7, 1933; 93 years ago
- Accessible: No; planned

Traffic
- 2025: 1,056,227 ▲10%
- Rank: 299 out of 423
Services
Preceding station	New York City Subway	Following station
Carroll Street via Bergen Street	Local	Fourth Avenue via Church Avenue
does not stop here
Location
Location within New York City Subway
Location within New York City
Location within New York
Track layout
Street map
Station service legend
Symbol	Description
Stops all times	Stops all times

The Smith–Ninth Streets station is a local station on the IND Culver Line of the New York City Subway. It is located over the Gowanus Canal near the intersection of Smith and Ninth Streets in Gowanus, Brooklyn, and is served by the F and G trains at all times. The <F> train skips this station when it operates. The station is 87.5 feet (26.7 m) above ground level, is the highest station in the New York City Subway, and was the highest rapid transit station in the world from its opening until 2022. (Note: The Chongqing Metro's Hualongqiao station, which opened in 2022, is 157 feet (48 m) high.)

This elevated station, opened on October 7, 1933, has four tracks and two side platforms. In 2009, the Metropolitan Transportation Authority began an extensive renovation of the station. It was closed entirely for a full reconstruction between June 2011 and April 2013.

== History ==
One of the goals of Mayor John Hylan's Independent Subway System (IND), proposed in the 1920s, was a line to Coney Island, reached by a recapture of the BMT Culver Line. As originally designed, service to and from Manhattan would have been exclusively provided by Culver express trains, while all local service would have fed into the IND Crosstown Line.

In 1925, the IND finalized plans to build its Culver (South Brooklyn) Line. The line's path crossed the Gowanus Canal, and the IND originally wanted to build a deep-river tunnel under the canal. To save money, the IND built a viaduct over the canal instead, resulting in the creation of the only above-ground section of the original IND. The first section of the line opened on March 20, 1933, from Jay Street to Bergen Street. The line was extended from Bergen Street to Church Avenue on October 7, 1933, including the Smith–Ninth Streets station.

=== Service patterns ===
The station was originally served by the A train. In 1936, the A was rerouted to the IND Fulton Street Line and was replaced by E trains from the Queens Boulevard Line. In 1937, the connection to the IND Crosstown Line opened and GG (later renamed the G) trains were extended to this station, complementing the E. In December 1940, after the IND Sixth Avenue Line opened, E trains were replaced by the F. Following the completion of the Culver Ramp in 1954, D Concourse Express trains replaced F service to Coney Island. In November 1967, the Chrystie Street Connection opened and D trains were rerouted via the Manhattan Bridge and the BMT Brighton Line to Coney Island. F trains were extended once again via the Culver Line.

The station acted as a local-only station from 1968 to 1976, when F trains ran express in both directions between Bergen Street and Church Avenue during rush hours. G trains were extended from Smith–Ninth Streets to Church Avenue to provide local service. Express service between Bergen and Church ended in 1976 due to budgetary concerns and passenger complaints, and the GG, later renamed the G, was again terminated at the Smith–Ninth Streets station.

In July 2009, the G was again extended from its terminus at Smith–Ninth Streets to a more efficient terminus at Church Avenue to accommodate the rehabilitation of the Culver Viaduct (see § Renovation). The G extension was made permanent in July 2012. In July 2019, the MTA revealed plans to restore express service on the Culver Line between Jay Street and Church Avenue. Express service started on September 16, 2019.

=== Renovation ===
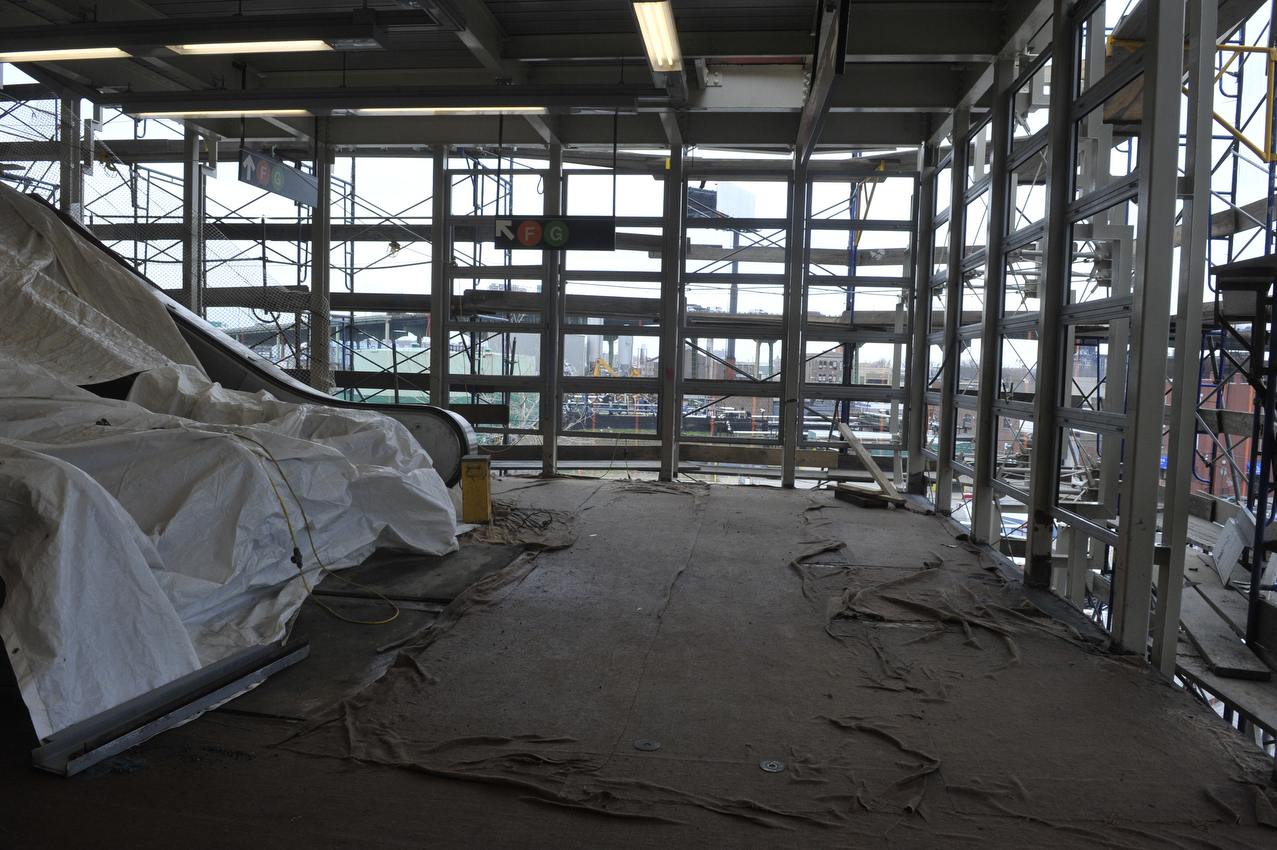
Renovation in progress

In 2007, the MTA announced a three-year, $257.5 million renovation project of the elevated Culver Viaduct, and that for twenty-seven months, this station would be fully or partially closed for a $32 million renovation. The renovation was necessitated because the viaduct was falling apart, with leaks and broken concrete riddling it. The station and the portions of the viaduct near the station had to be encased in a mesh wrapping because there was a significant danger of concrete falling from the viaduct.

On January 18, 2011, the second phase of the Culver Viaduct rehabilitation project began, resulting in the closure of the Manhattan-bound platform. This required northbound trains to use the express track and stop at a temporary platform placed over the local track. Due to construction limitations, the platform could only accommodate G trains; F trains bypassed this station on the same track. On June 20, 2011, the station was closed entirely for further renovations, to be reopened in December 2012. Due to delays and cost overruns, it reopened on April 26, 2013. Additional work was performed after the station reopened but it did not affect service.

Residents lobbied for an elevator in the station during the renovation, but a spokesman for the MTA initially said that installation of an elevator was too costly and prohibitive, and that such an elevator would have damaged the station's structural integrity. As part of its 2025–2029 Capital Program, the MTA has proposed making the station wheelchair-accessible in compliance with the Americans with Disabilities Act of 1990. In August 2025, the MTA and state legislators Andrew Gounardes and Jo Anne Simon announced that elevators would be installed in the station.

== Station layout ==
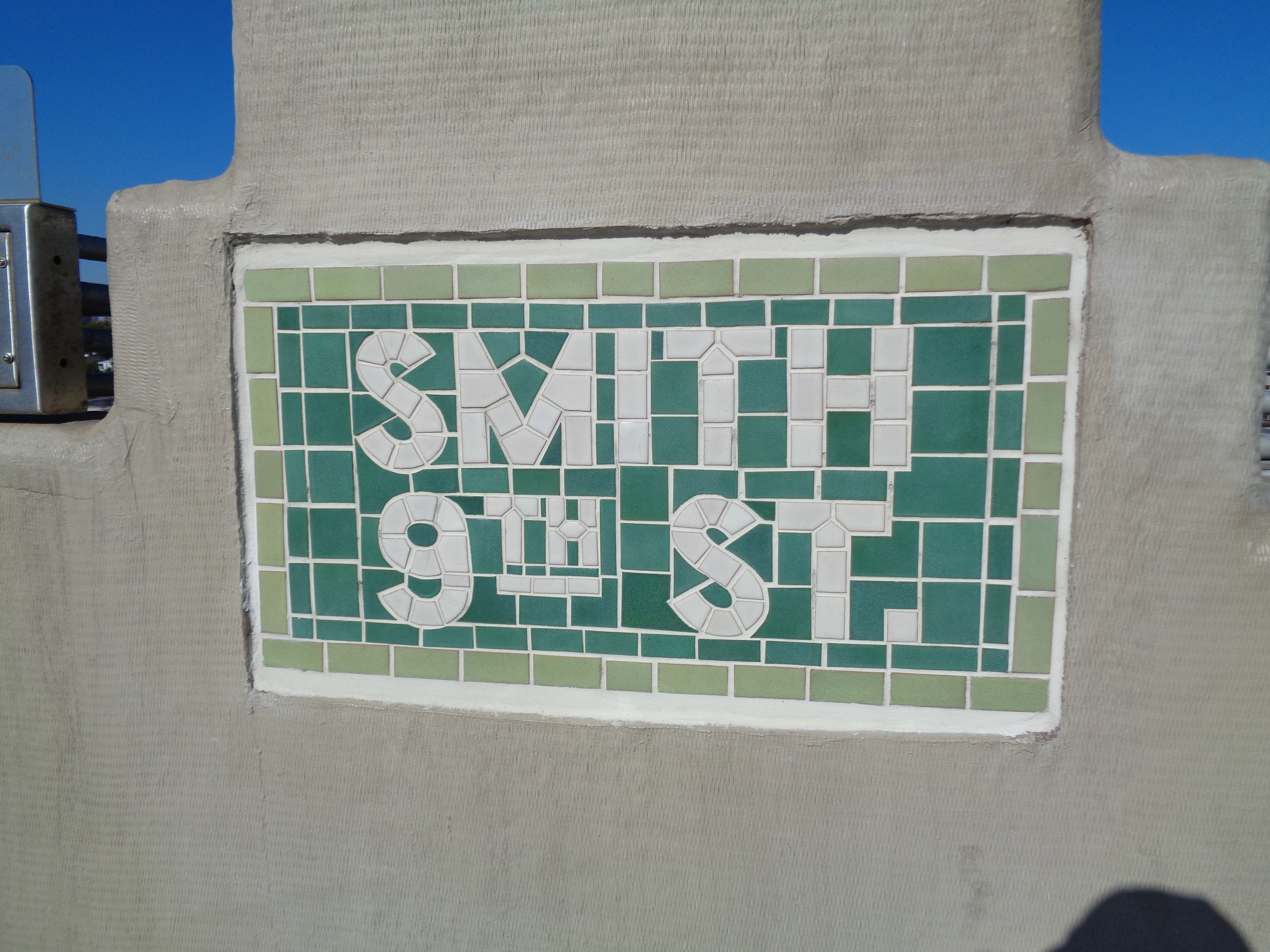
Name tablet mosaic

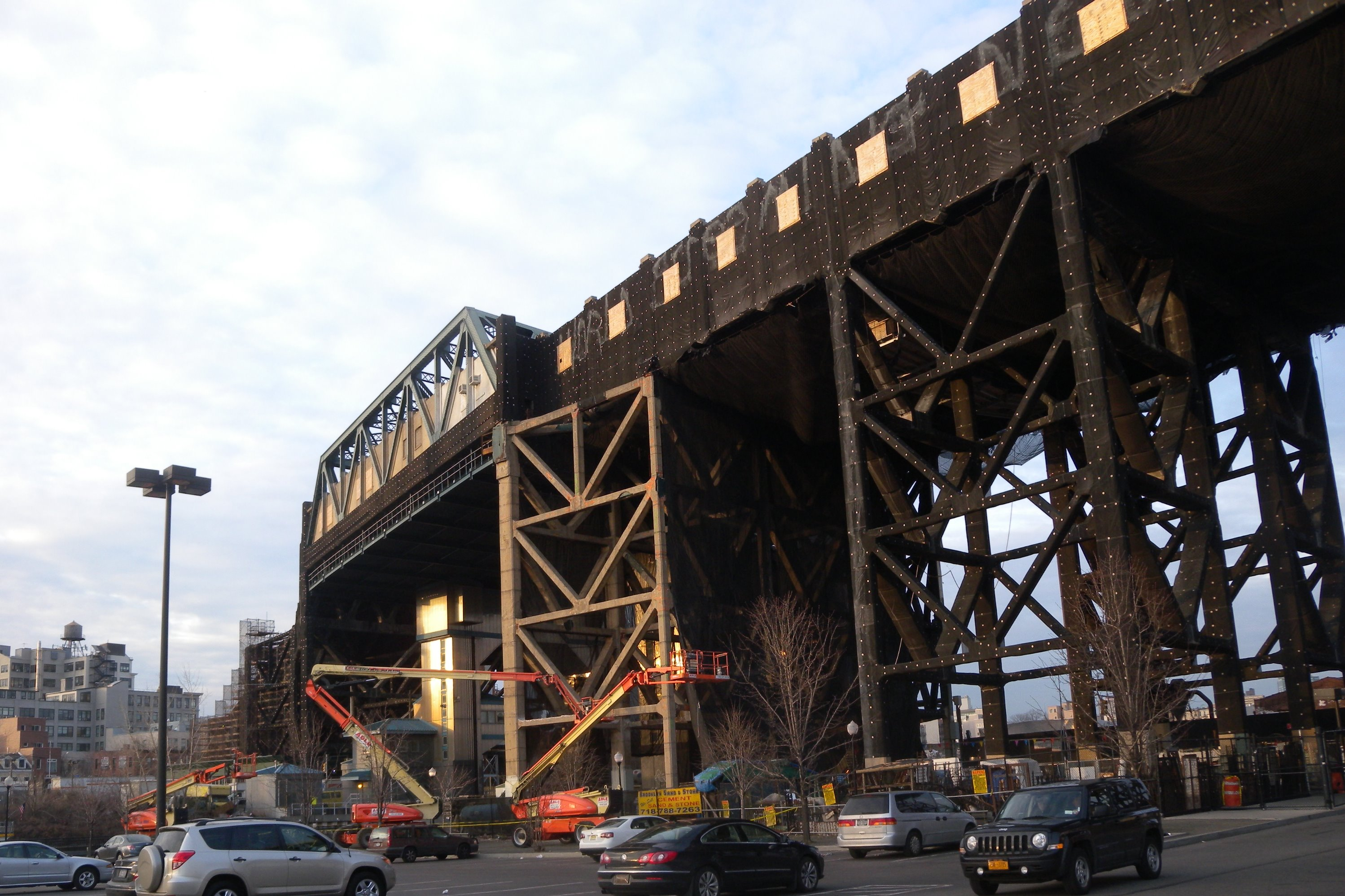
Seen from a parking lot beside the Gowanus Canal

With an elevation of 87.5 feet (26.7 m) above ground level, Smith–Ninth Streets was the highest rapid transit station in the world when it was built. This elevation was required by now-defunct navigation regulations for tall-mast shipping on the Gowanus Canal, so the elevated structure rises over the entire structure of the Ninth Street Bridge, a vertical-lift bridge which carries its namesake street over the canal. West (railroad north) of this station, the IND Culver Line curves north and enters a tunnel into Carroll Street station. This station and the next station south, Fourth Avenue, were the only original elevated stations built by the IND, with the remainder being underground.

This station and elevated structure are made entirely of concrete. There were green mosaics along the concrete platform walls reading “Smith–9th St” in white sans-serif lettering, which were replaced with laminated replicas during renovations. A close examination of the canopied area suggests windows existed in the past. These were covered for many years and are now open air with safety grates. The station house is on ground level on the north side of 9th Street between Smith Street and the Gowanus Canal. Inside, there is a turnstile bank, token booth, and three escalators and one staircase going up to a landing, where three more escalators and one staircase perpendicular for the first set go up to a crossunder. A single staircase then goes up to the western end of either platform. The station has a single exit on Ninth Street east of Smith Street.

== Gallery ==
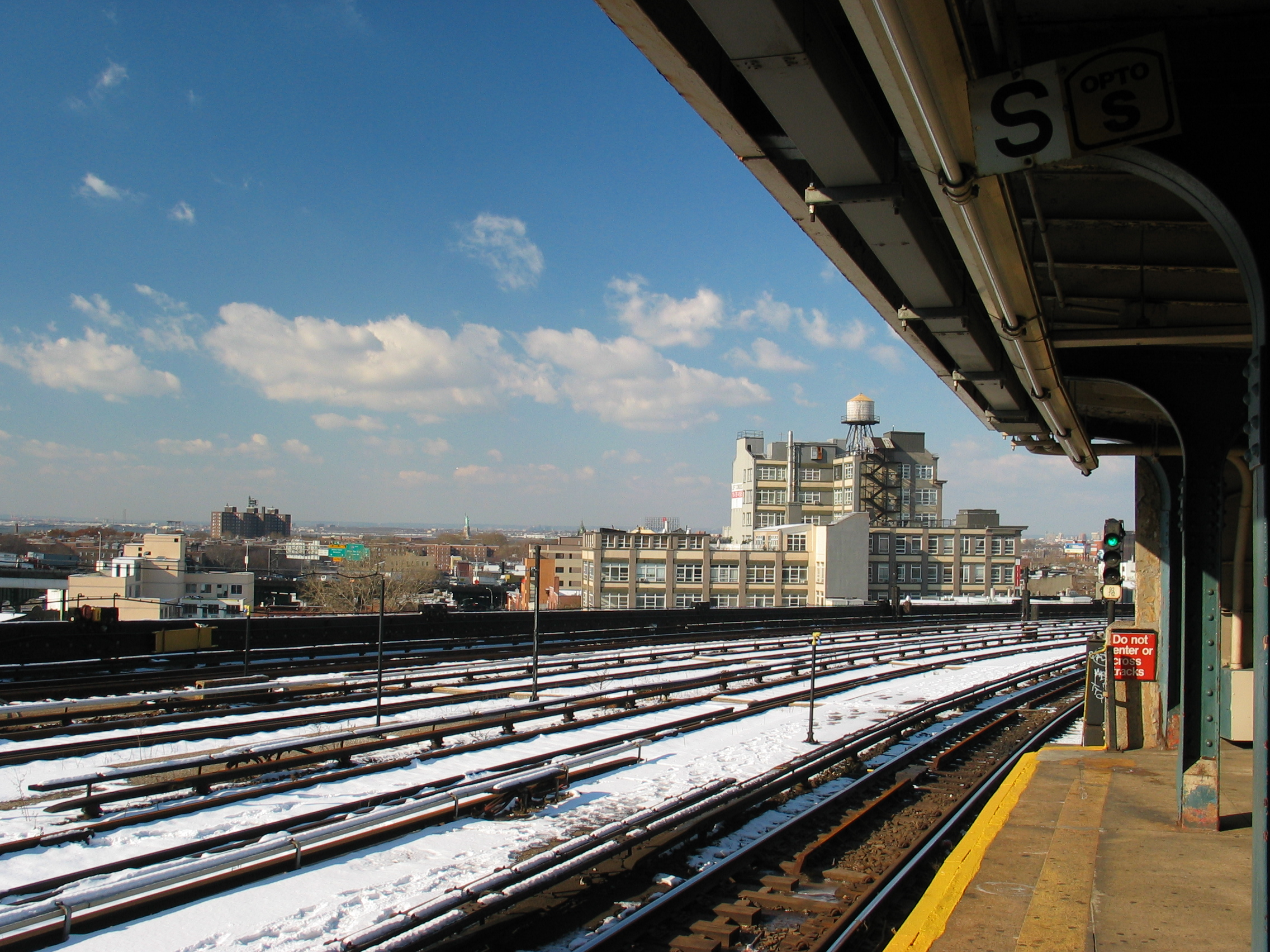
View facing west before renovation

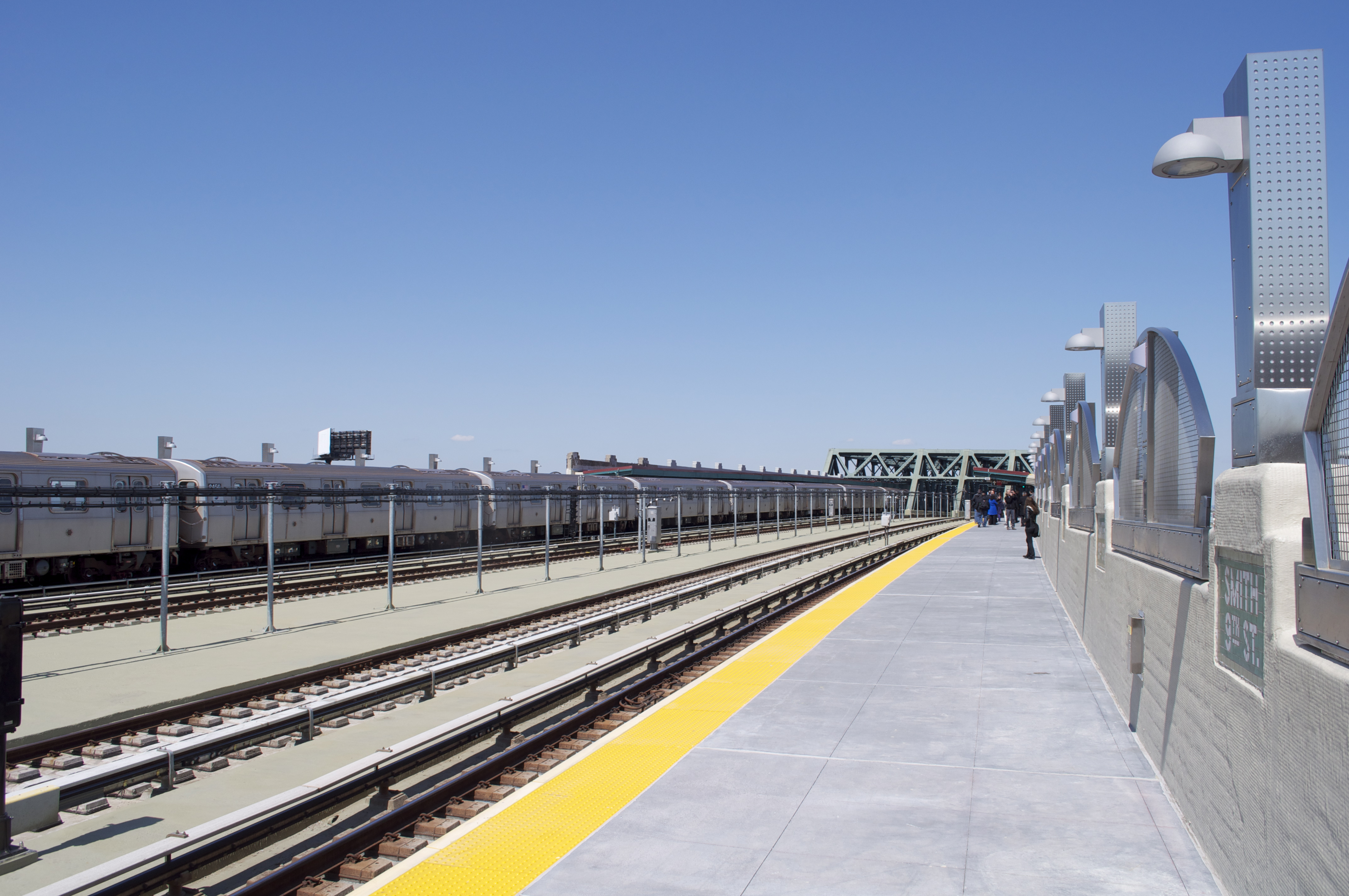
View of renovated eastern end of platform

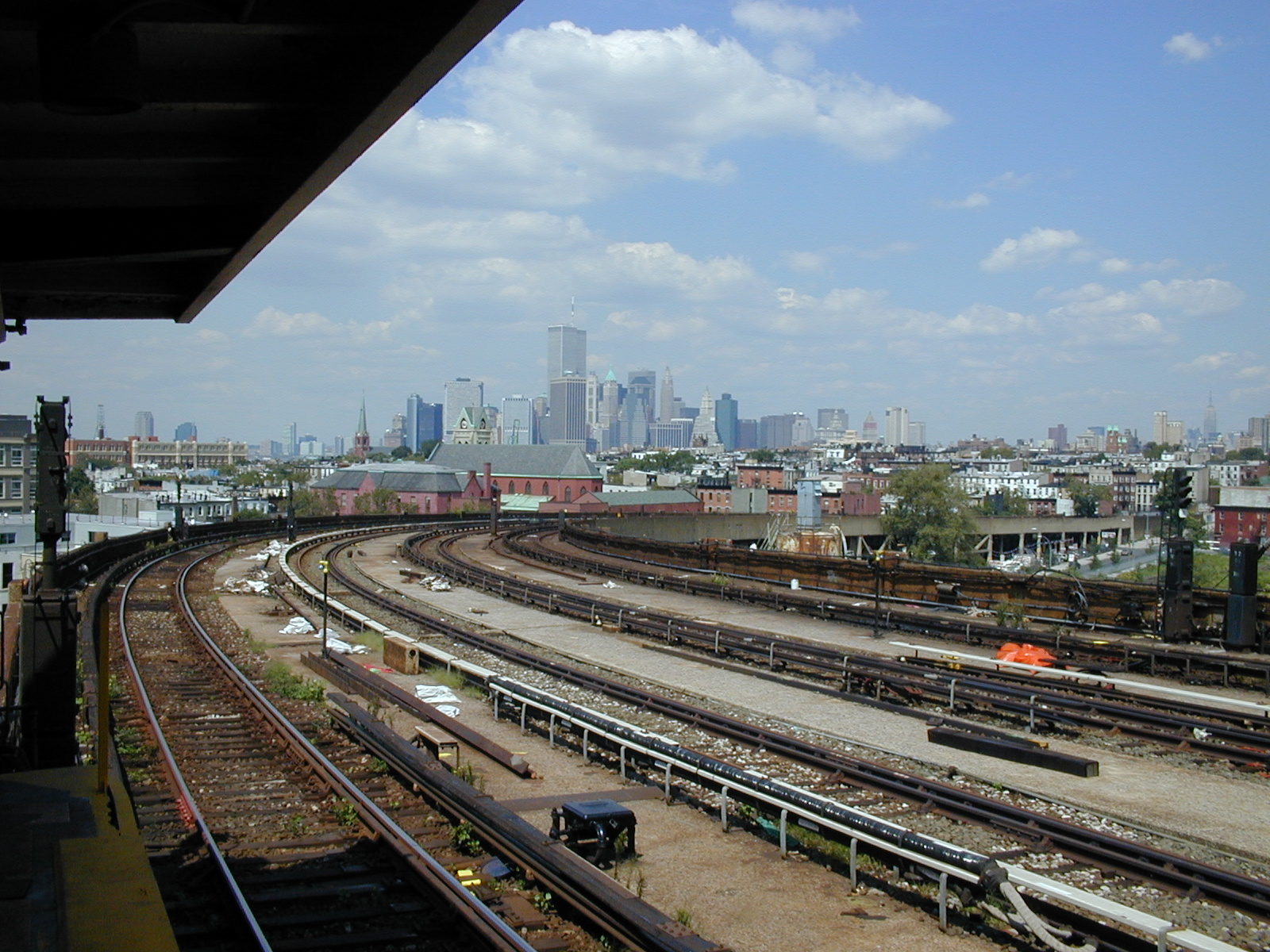
Lower Manhattan skyline from the station prior to the September 11 attacks

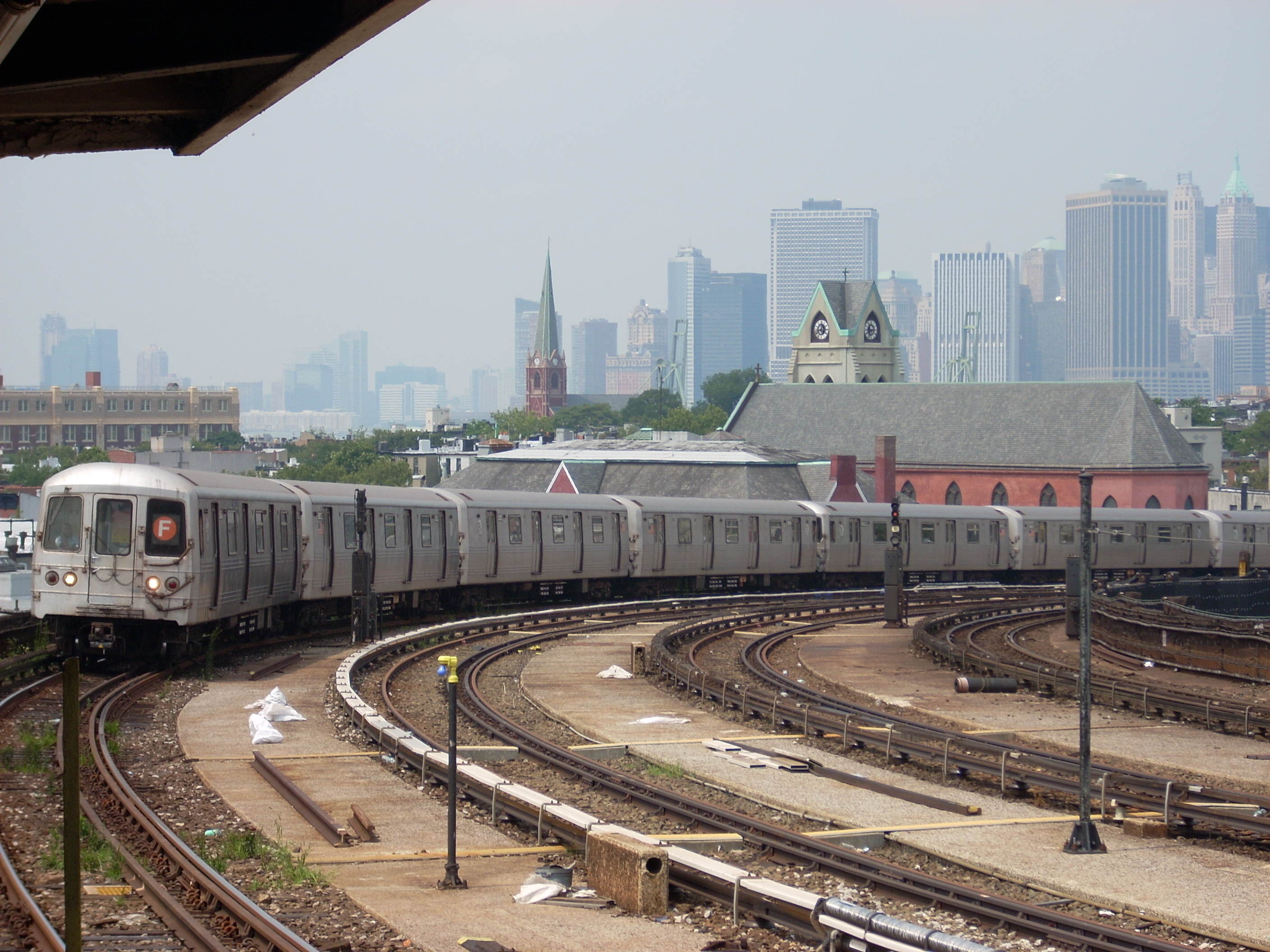
R46 F train to Coney Island enters Smith-Ninth Streets before renovation.

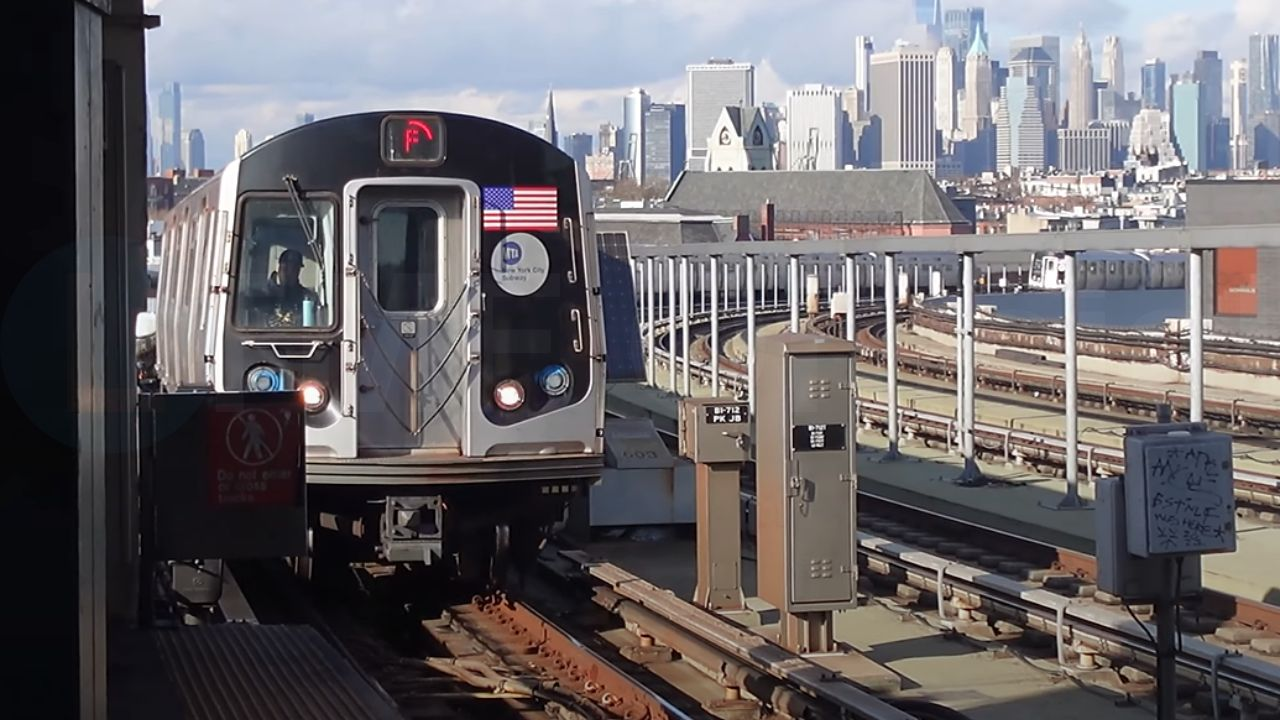
R160 F train approaching Smith-9th Streets after renovation.
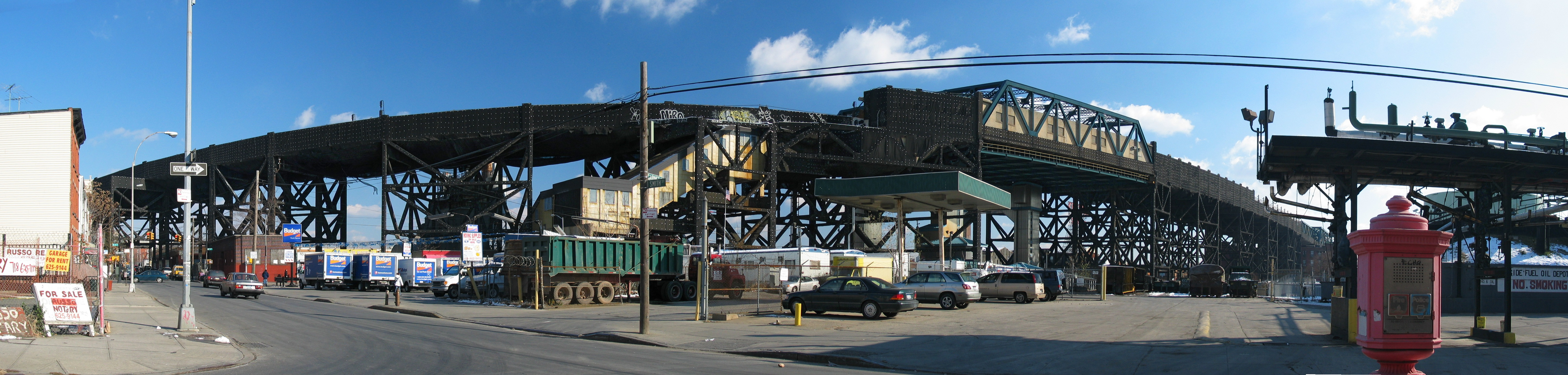
Station seen from Gowanus in 2005
