= Union Street station (BMT Fourth Avenue Line) =

New York City Subway station in Brooklyn

Union Street
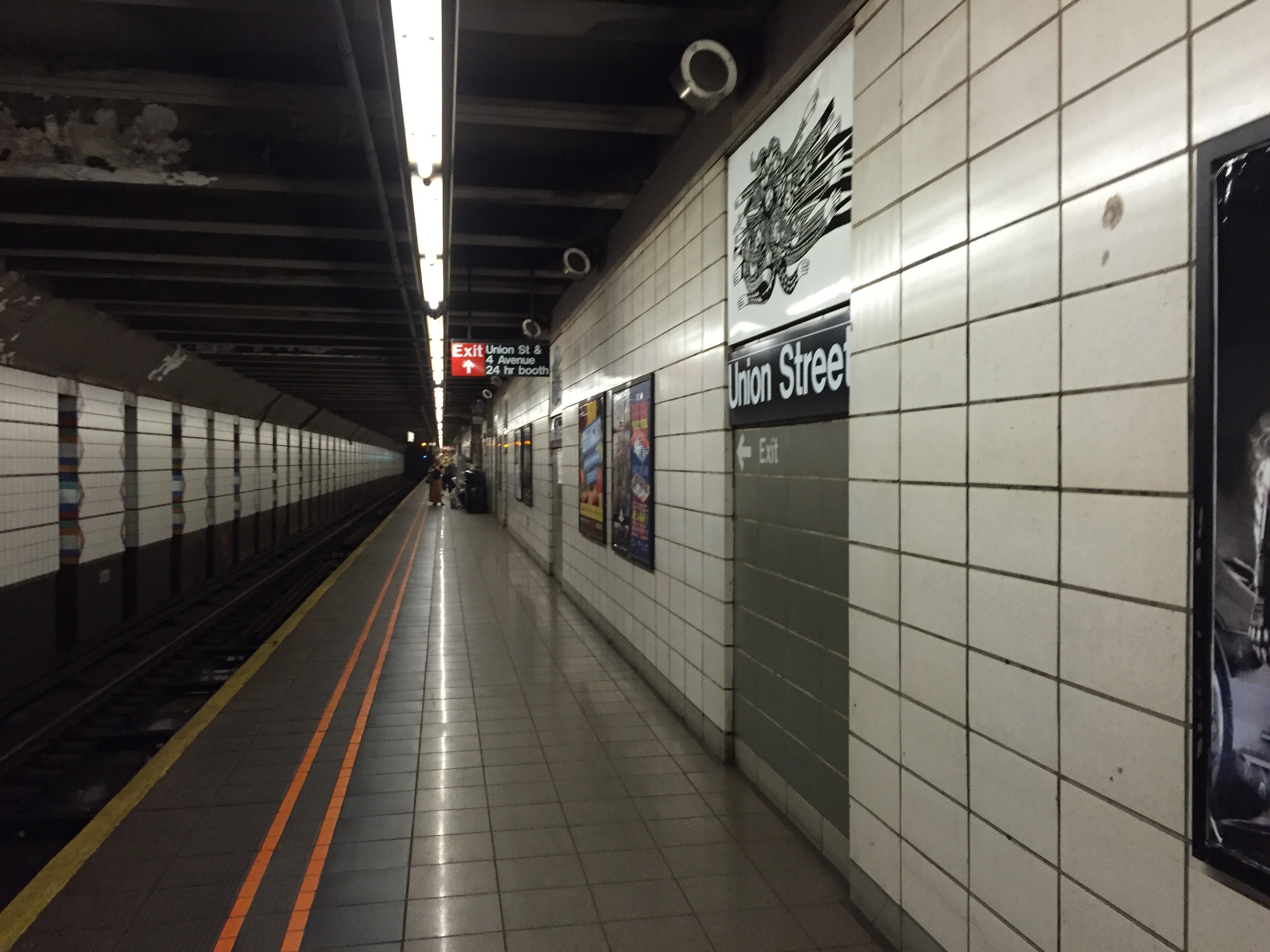
- Manhattan bound platform

Station statistics
- Address: Union Street & Fourth Avenue; Brooklyn, New York
- Borough: Brooklyn
- Locale: Park Slope
- Coordinates: 40°40′38″N 73°58′59″W
- Division: B (BMT)
- Line: BMT Fourth Avenue Line
- Services: D (late nights); N (late nights, and limited rush hour service in the reverse-peak direction); R (all times); W (limited rush hour service only)
- Structure: Underground
- Platforms: 2 side platforms
- Tracks: 4

Other information
- Opened: June 22, 1915; 111 years ago
- Accessible: No; planned

Traffic
- 2025: 1,992,938 ▲11.1%
- Rank: 179 out of 423
Services
Preceding station	New York City Subway	Following station
Atlantic Avenue–Barclays Center D N R W toward Forest Hills–71st Avenue	Local	Ninth Street D N R W toward Bay Ridge–95th Street
Location
Location within New York City Subway
Location within New York City
Location within New York
Track layout
Street map
Station service legend
Symbol	Description
Stops all times except late nights	Stops all times except late nights
Stops late nights only	Stops late nights only
Stops rush hours only	Stops rush hours only
Stops rush hours in the peak direction only	Stops rush hours in the peak direction only

The Union Street station is a local station on the BMT Fourth Avenue Line of the New York City Subway. It is located at the corner of Fourth Avenue and Union Street in Brooklyn, New York City, serving the communities of Park Slope, Gowanus and Carroll Gardens. It is served by the R train at all times. The D and N trains also stop here during late nights, and some rush-hour W trains stop here in the peak direction.

The Union Street station was constructed as part of the Fourth Avenue Line, which was approved in 1905. Construction on the segment of the line that includes Union Street started on December 20, 1909, and was completed in September 1912. The station opened on June 22, 1915, as part of the initial portion of the BMT Fourth Avenue Line to 59th Street. The station's platforms were lengthened in 1926–1927, and again during a renovation in 1968–1970. The station was also renovated in 1970 and in the mid-1990s.

== History ==
=== Construction and opening ===
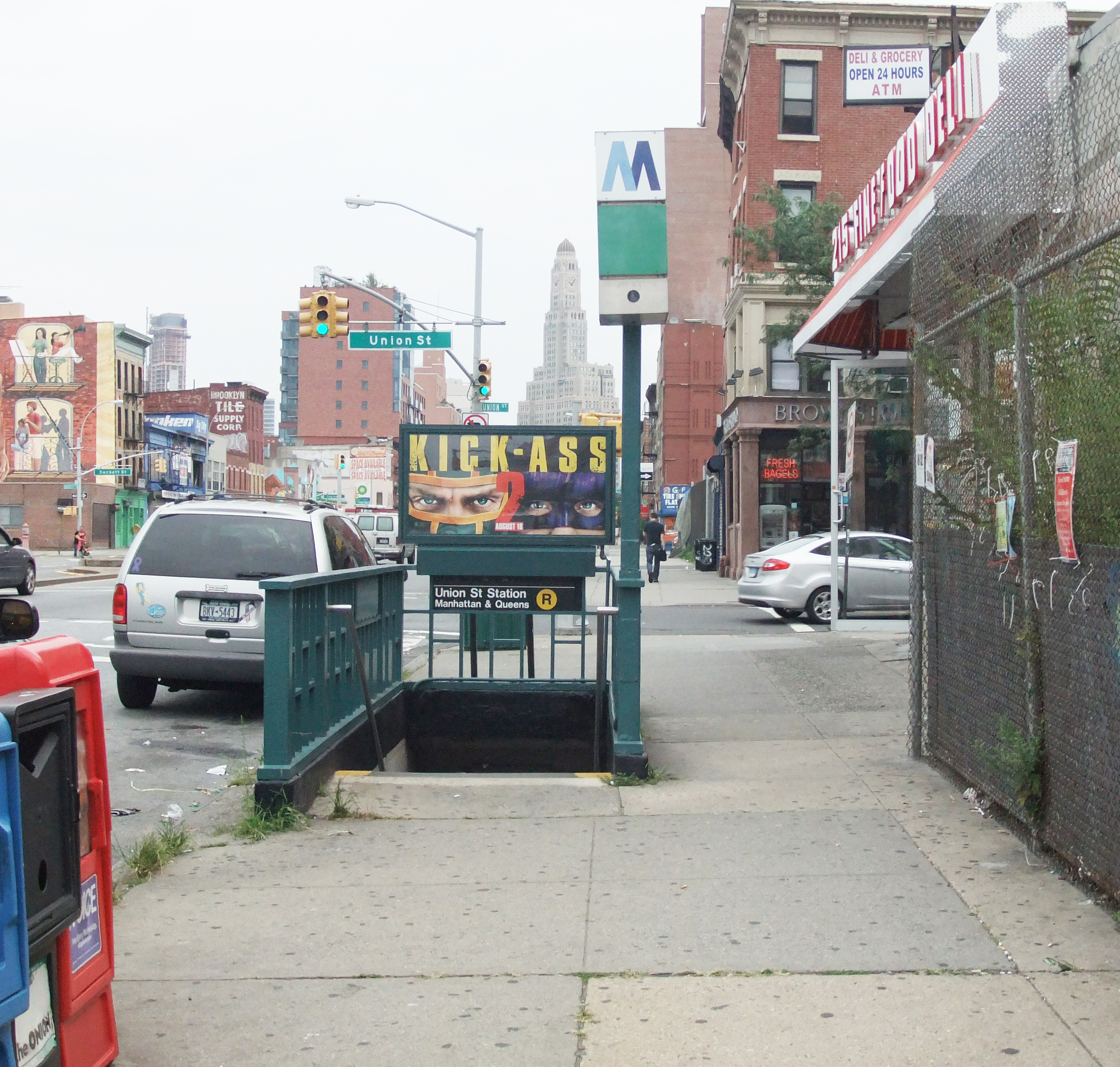
Entrance to the Manhattan-bound platform

The Union Street station was constructed as part of the Fourth Avenue Line, the plan for which was initially adopted on June 1, 1905. The Rapid Transit Commission was succeeded on July 1, 1907, by the New York State Public Service Commission (PSC), which approved the plan for the line in late 1907. The contract for the section of the line that included the Union Street station, Route 11A2, which extended from 10th Street to Sackett Street, was awarded on May 22, 1908, to the E.E. Smith Construction Company for $2,296,234.93 (equivalent to $82,282,000 in 2025). The New York City Board of Estimate approved the contract on October 29, 1909. Construction on the segment started on December 20, 1909, and was completed in September 1912.

As part of negotiations between New York City, the Brooklyn Rapid Transit Company (BRT), and the Interborough Rapid Transit Company for the expansion of the city's transit network, the line was leased to a subsidiary of the BRT. The agreement, known as Contract 4 of the Dual Contracts, was signed on March 19, 1913. Union Street opened on June 22, 1915, as part of an extension of the subway to Coney Island, which included the Fourth Avenue Line north of 59th Street as well as the entire Sea Beach Line. The station's opening was marked with a competition between two trains heading from Chambers Street station in Manhattan to the Coney Island station, one heading via the West End Line and the other via the Sea Beach Line; the latter got to Coney Island first.

=== Station renovations ===
==== 1920s ====
On June 27, 1922, the New York State Transit Commission commissioned its engineers to examine platform-lengthening plans for 23 stations on the lines of the Brooklyn–Manhattan Transit Corporation (BMT), the successor to the BRT, to accommodate eight-car trains. As part of the project, Union Street's platforms would have been lengthened from 435 feet (133 m) to 530 feet (160 m). Though the Transit Commission ordered the BMT to lengthen these platforms in September 1923, no further progress was made until February 16, 1925, when the New York City Board of Transportation (NYCBOT) commissioned its engineers to examine platform-lengthening plans for this and eleven other stations along the Fourth Avenue Line. It estimated the project would cost $633,000 (equivalent to $11,621,000 in 2025). The NYCBOT received bids for the project on February 25, 1926. The contract was awarded to the Corson Construction Company for $345,021 (equivalent to $6,275,000 in 2025). The extensions opened on August 1, 1927.

==== 1950s and 1960s ====
The city government took over the BMT's operations on June 1, 1940. In July 1959, the New York City Transit Authority (NYCTA) announced that it would install fluorescent lighting at the Union Street station and five other stations along the Fourth Avenue Line for between $175,000 and $200,000. Bids on the project were to be advertised on August 7, 1959, and completed by fall 1960.

In the 1960s, the NYCTA started a project to lengthen station platforms on its lines in Southern Brooklyn to 615 feet (187 m) to accommodate 10-car trains. On July 14, 1967, the NYCTA awarded a contract to conduct test borings at eleven stations on the Fourth Avenue Line, including Union Street, to the W. M. Walsh Corporation for $6,585 (equivalent to $63,583 in 2025) in preparation of the construction of platform extensions. The NYCTA issued an invitation for bids on the project to extend the platforms at stations along the Fourth Avenue Line between Pacific Street and 36th Street, including those at Union Street, on March 28, 1969. The contract was awarded to the Horn Construction Company on May 13, 1969, for $7,381,890 (equivalent to $64,809,000 in 2025). Funding for the renovation projects came out of the NYCTA's 1969–1970 Capital Budget, costing $8,177,890 (equivalent to $71,798,000 in 2025) in total.

As part of the renovation project, the station's platforms were extended 85 feet (26 m) to the north, and the station's elaborate mosaic tile walls were covered over with 8-by-16-inch (20 by 41 cm) white cinderblock tiles. The latter change, which was also made to 15 other stations on the BMT Broadway and Fourth Avenue Line, was criticized for being dehumanizing. The NYCTA spokesman stated that the old tiles were in poor condition and that the change was made to improve the appearance of stations and provide uniformity. Furthermore, it did not consider the old mosaics to have "any great artistic merit".

==== 1990s ====
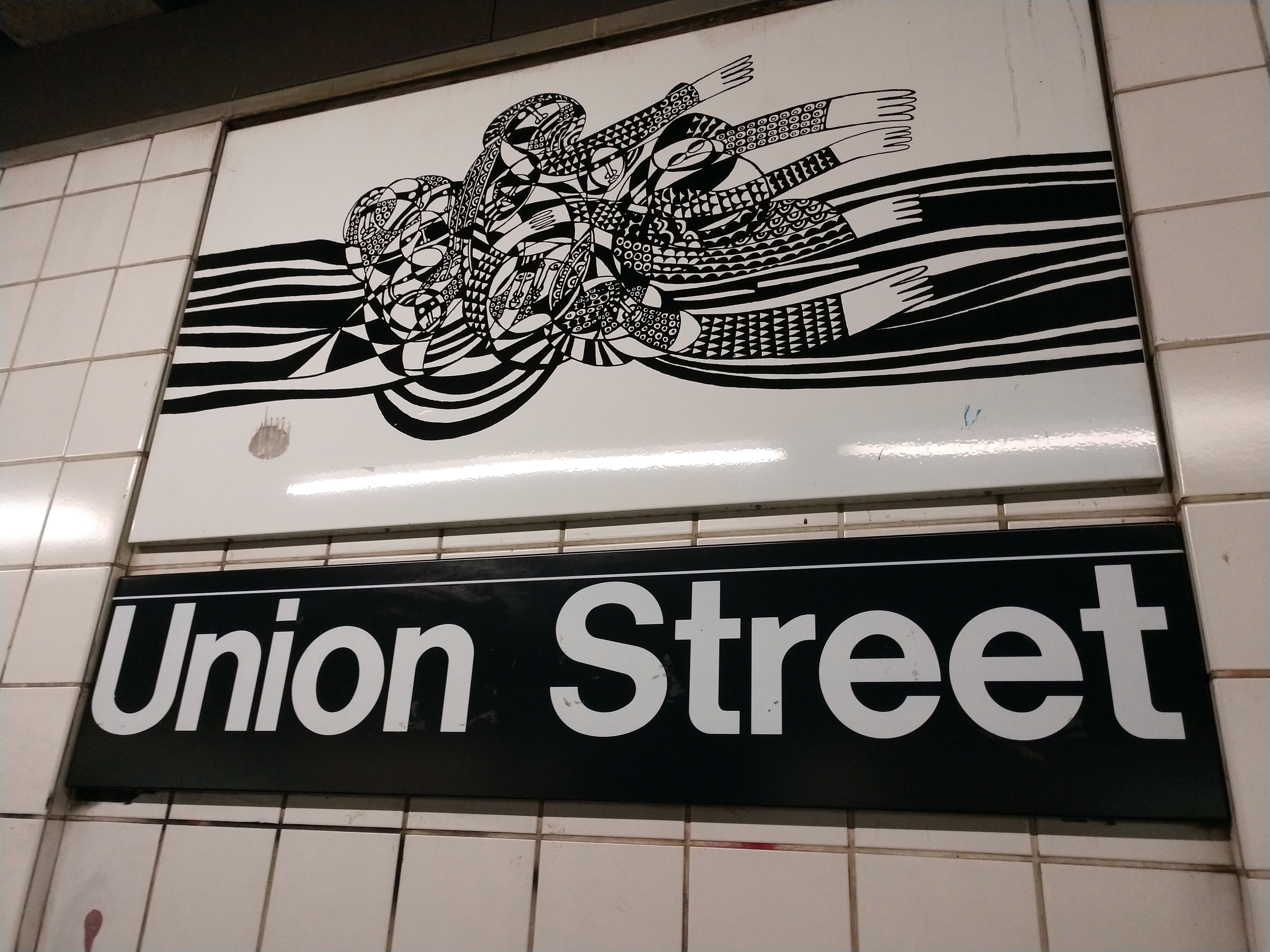
CommUnion artwork above the signage

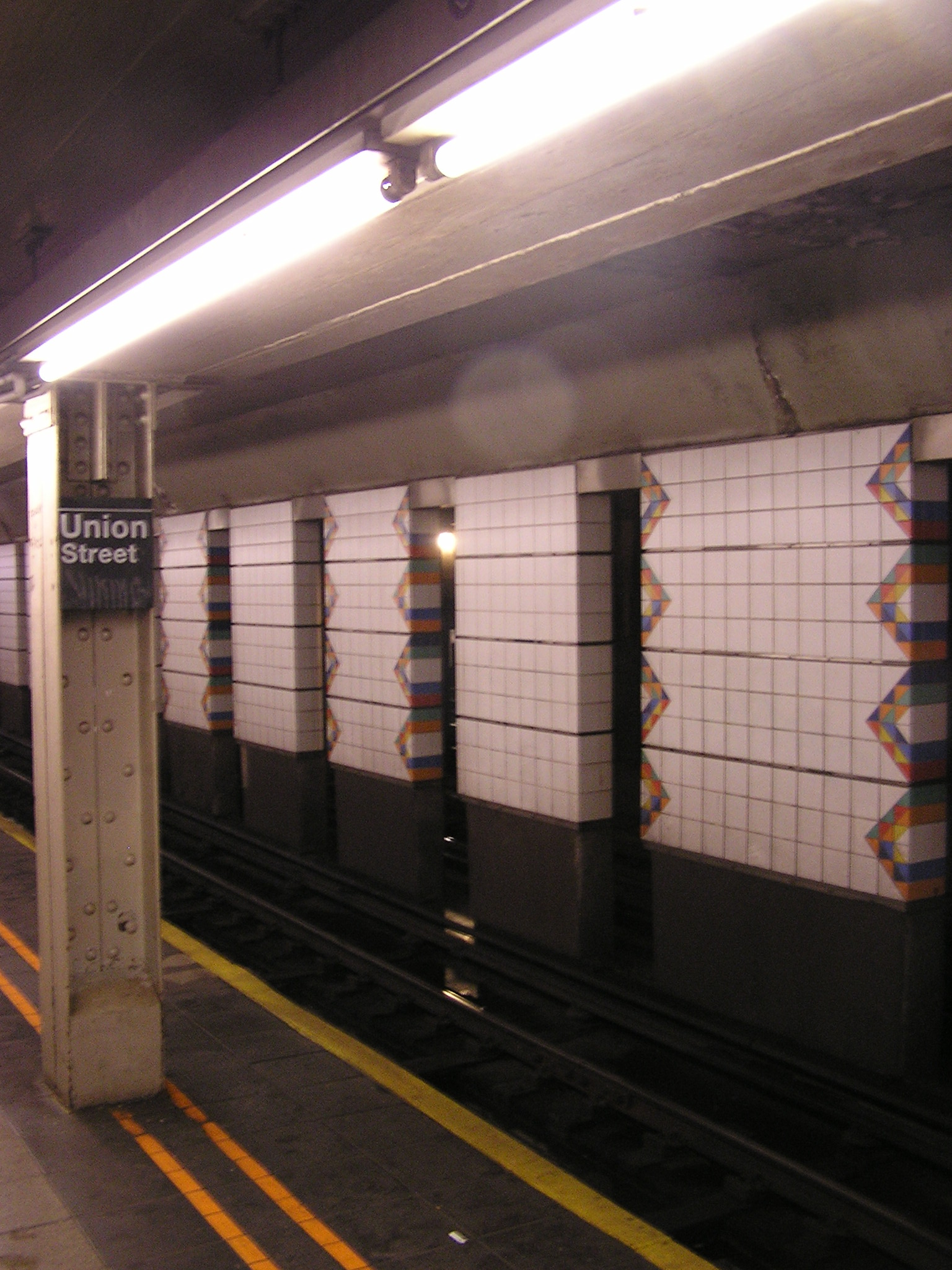
CommUnion tilework on the track wall

The station was renovated again from 1991 to 1994. The $2.397 million (equivalent to $5,666,000 in 2025) contract for the project was awarded on February 28, 1991. During the closure of the Bay Ridge-bound platform, the glazed tiles at the station were heavily defaced with graffiti, and were cleaned prior to the station's reopening with a heavy duty cleaner, which damaged the glazing. A modification to the contract was approved on May 23, 1994. As part of the modification, new graffiti resistant ceramic tile was installed, signage, advertising panels, benches and trash bins were removed and reinstalled, exhaust systems were added in the porter rooms at both platforms, and the wall-mounted conductors board was replaced by a ceiling-mounted one. The modification cost $174,000 (equivalent to $378,000 in 2025), and change orders cost $111,004 (equivalent to $241,000 in 2025). The Brooklyn-bound platform was closed between July 15 and November 15, 1991, while the Manhattan-bound platform was closed between February 19 and June 20, 1992.

In addition to upgrading the same elements that were replaced in the previous overhaul, floors and track wall tiling, the public announcement system, and safety treads along platform edges and track-beds were replaced. It also included an art installation by Emmett Wigglesworth called CommUnion. It features twenty-two panels of various designs in the recessed area of the platform tiles above the station signs and other designs on the openings in the track walls.

==== Proposed accessibility ====
As part of the 2015–2019 Metropolitan Transportation Authority Capital Program, $300 million was allocated to enhance station access and provide ADA-accessibility at 15 stations chosen by New York City. Four stations were being evaluated for such improvements, including the Union Street station.

In 2019, development firm Avery Hall Investments offered to pay $11 million for a new entrance to the southbound platform, including an elevator, as part of the development of a 17-story building on the northwestern corner of Fourth Avenue and Union Street (651 Union Street). In exchange, the developers would be able to add 50,000 square feet (4,600 m^{2}) of space to their building. In late March 2022, 204 4th Avenue LLC submitted an application for the new easement entrance to the New York City government.

== Station layout ==
This underground station has four tracks and two side platforms. The R stops here at all times; some rush-hour W trains stop here in the peak direction; and the D and N stop here during late nights, but use the center express tracks to bypass the station during daytime hours. The station is between Atlantic Avenue–Barclays Center to the north and Ninth Street to the south. A white tiled curtain wall separates the express tracks from the local tracks, with several openings that allow a view of the tracks from the platforms. The walls were intended to improve ventilation, as passing trains would push air forward, rather than to the sides of the tunnel.

Both platforms are columnless except for a section at their extreme north ends, where they were extended in 1970 to accommodate 10-car trains. Here, the columns are cream colored I-beams. The ceiling is lower in this section.

Prior to the station's 1970 renovation, it was finished all in white and marble tile with green trim, in a distinctive shade to allow regular passengers to identify the station based only on the color of the marble trimmings. Since the renovation, the station walls have consisted of white cinderblock tiles, except for small recesses in the walls, which contain gray-painted cinderblock tiles. The gray cinderblock field contains the station-name signs and white text pointing to the exits.

=== Exits ===
Each platform has one same-level fare control area in the center and there are no crossovers or crossunders to allow free transfer between directions. The Manhattan-bound side has a fare control area, a turnstile bank, token booth, and two street stairs. The stairs on the Manhattan-bound platform go up to the southeast corner of Union Street and Fourth Avenue while those on the Bay Ridge-bound platform goes up to the southwest corner. The Bay Ridge-bound side has a fare control area, a turnstile bank without a token booth, and two street stairs.
