= Fourth Avenue/Ninth Street station =

New York City Subway station in Brooklyn

4 Avenue/9 Street
- New York City Subway station complex
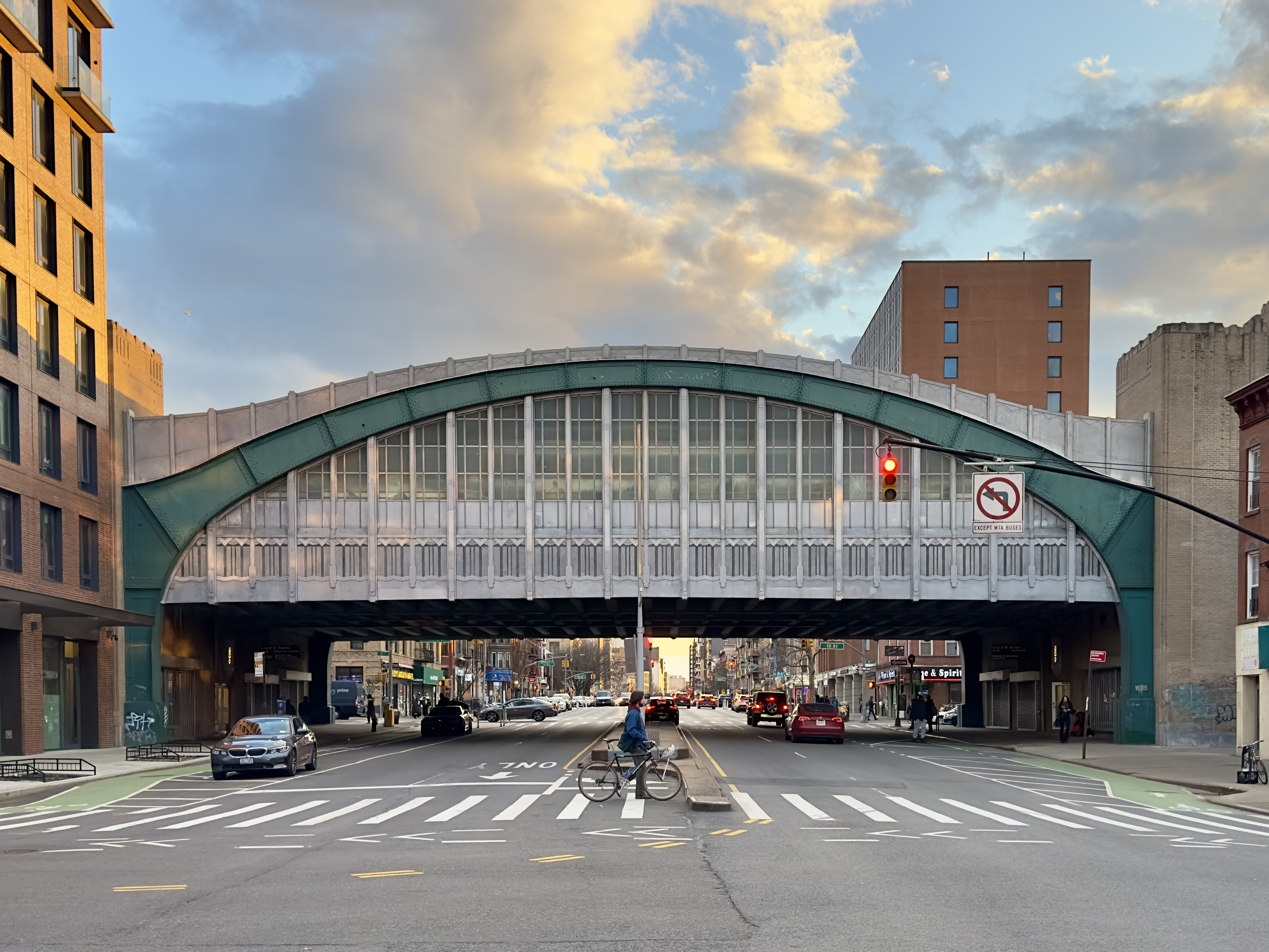
- The IND Culver Line's bridge over Fourth Avenue

Station statistics
- Address: Fourth Avenue and Ninth Street; Brooklyn, New York
- Borough: Brooklyn
- Locale: Park Slope, Gowanus
- Coordinates: 40°40′13″N 73°59′23″W
- Division: B (BMT/IND)
- Line: BMT Fourth Avenue Line; IND Culver Line
- Services: D (late nights); N (late nights, and limited rush hour service in the reverse-peak direction); R (all times); W (limited rush hour service only); F (all times); G (all times)
- Transit: NYCT Bus: B61; MTA Bus: B103
- Levels: 2

Other information
- Accessible: No; planned

Traffic
- 2025: 3,120,872 ▲7.6%
- Rank: 120 out of 423
Location
Location within New York City Subway
Location within New York City
Location within New York
Street map
Station service legend
Symbol	Description
Stops all times except late nights	Stops all times except late nights
Stops all times	Stops all times
Stops late nights only	Stops late nights only
Stops rush hours only	Stops rush hours only
Stops rush hours in the peak direction only	Stops rush hours in the peak direction only

The Fourth Avenue/Ninth Street station is a New York City Subway station complex shared by the elevated IND Culver Line and the underground BMT Fourth Avenue Line. It is located at the intersection of Ninth Street and Fourth Avenue in Park Slope, Brooklyn and served by the:

- F, G and R trains at all times
- D and N trains late nights
- W train during rush hours only, with some trips in the peak direction

The Ninth Street portion of the station was constructed as part of the Fourth Avenue Line, which was approved in 1905. Construction on the segment of the line that includes Union Street started on December 20, 1909, and was completed in September 1912. The station opened on June 22, 1915, as part of the initial portion of the BMT Fourth Avenue Line to 59th Street. The station's platforms were lengthened in 1926–1927, and again in 1970. The Fourth Avenue portion was built as part of the Culver Line of the city-operated Independent Subway System, and was constructed as an elevated station so the line could pass over the Gowanus Canal to the west. This station opened on October 7, 1933. The two stations were consolidated into a single station complex on May 28, 1959.

== History ==
=== Fourth Avenue Line ===
==== Construction and opening ====
The Ninth Street station was constructed as part of the Fourth Avenue Line, and was the first part of this station complex to open. The plan for the line was initially adopted on June 1, 1905. The Rapid Transit Commission was succeeded on July 1, 1907, by the New York State Public Service Commission (PSC), which approved the plan for the line in late 1907. The contract for the section of the line that included the Ninth Street station, Route 11A2, which extended from 10th Street to Sackett Street, was awarded on May 22, 1908, to the E.E. Smith Construction Company for $2,296,234.93 (equivalent to $82,282,000 in 2025). The New York City Board of Estimate approved the contract on October 29, 1909. Construction on the segment started on December 20, 1909, and was completed in September 1912. The South Brooklyn Board of Trade proposed in 1910 to change the Ninth Street and DeKalb Avenue stations from local to express stops, as well as changing the Pacific Street station from an express stop to a local stop, but this was not done.

As part of negotiations between New York City, the Brooklyn Rapid Transit Company (BRT), and the Interborough Rapid Transit Company for the expansion of the city's transit network, the line was leased to a subsidiary of the BRT. The agreement, known as Contract 4 of the Dual Contracts, was signed on March 19, 1913. Ninth Street opened on June 22, 1915, as part of an extension of the subway to Coney Island, which included the Fourth Avenue Line north of 59th Street as well as the entire Sea Beach Line. The station's opening was marked with a competition between two trains heading from Chambers Street station in Manhattan to the Coney Island station, one heading via the West End Line and the other via the Sea Beach Line; the latter got to Coney Island first.

==== 1920s platform extensions ====
On June 27, 1922, the New York State Transit Commission commissioned its engineers to examine platform-lengthening plans for 23 stations on the lines of the Brooklyn–Manhattan Transit Corporation (BMT), the successor to the BRT, to accommodate eight-car trains. As part of the project, Ninth Street's platforms would have been lengthened from 435 feet (133 m) to 530 feet (160 m). Though the Transit Commission ordered the BMT to lengthen these platforms in September 1923, no further progress was made until February 16, 1925, when the New York City Board of Transportation (NYCBOT) commissioned its engineers to examine platform-lengthening plans for this and eleven other stations along the Fourth Avenue Line. It estimated the project would cost $633,000 (equivalent to $11,621,000 in 2025). The NYCBOT received bids for the project on February 25, 1926. The contract was awarded to the Corson Construction Company for $345,021 (equivalent to $6,275,000 in 2025). The extensions opened on August 1, 1927.

=== Culver Line ===
The Fourth Avenue station was constructed as part of the Culver (South Brooklyn) Line of the Independent Subway System (IND). One of the goals of Mayor John Hylan's IND, proposed in the 1920s, was a line to Coney Island, reached by a recapture of the BMT Culver Line. As originally designed, service to and from Manhattan would have been exclusively provided by Culver express trains, while all local service would have fed into the IND Crosstown Line.

In 1925, the IND finalized plans to build the line. The line's path crossed the Gowanus Canal, and the IND originally wanted to build a deep-river tunnel under the canal. To save money, the IND built a viaduct over the canal instead, resulting in the creation of the only above-ground section of the original IND. The first section of the line opened on March 20, 1933, from Jay Street to Bergen Street. The line was extended from Bergen Street to Church Avenue on October 7, 1933, including the Fourth Avenue station.

=== Station complex and subsequent years ===
The city government took over the BMT's operations on June 1, 1940. A free transfer point was established between the two stations on May 28, 1959, to compensate for the loss of through Culver service via the Fourth Avenue Line.

==== Fourth Avenue Line renovation ====
In July 1959, the New York City Transit Authority (NYCTA) announced that it would install fluorescent lighting at the Ninth Street station and five other stations along the Fourth Avenue Line for between $175,000 and $200,000. Bids on the project were to be advertised on August 7, 1959, and completed by fall 1960.

In the 1960s, the NYCTA started a project to lengthen station platforms on its lines in Southern Brooklyn to 615 feet (187 m) to accommodate 10-car trains. On July 14, 1967, the NYCTA awarded a contract to conduct test borings at eleven stations on the Fourth Avenue Line, including Ninth Street, to the W. M. Walsh Corporation for $6,585 (equivalent to $63,583 in 2025) in preparation of the construction of platform extensions. The NYCTA issued an invitation for bids on the project to extend the platforms at stations along the Fourth Avenue Line between Pacific Street and 36th Street, including those at Ninth Street, on March 28, 1969. Funding for the renovation projects came out of the NYCTA's 1969–1970 Capital Budget, costing $8,177,890 (equivalent to $71,798,000 in 2025) in total.

As part of the renovation project, the station's platforms were extended, and the station's elaborate mosaic tile walls were covered over with 8-by-16-inch (20 by 41 cm) white cinderblock tiles. The latter change, which was also made to 15 other stations on the BMT Broadway and Fourth Avenue Lines, was criticized for being dehumanizing. The NYCTA spokesman stated that the old tiles were in poor condition and that the change was made to improve the appearance of stations and provide uniformity. Furthermore, it did not consider the old mosaics to have "any great artistic merit".

==== Culver Viaduct renovation ====
In 2007, the Metropolitan Transportation Authority (MTA) announced a three-year renovation project of the elevated Culver Viaduct. The work area covers from south of Carroll Street to north of Ditmas Avenue. For Phase 2A of the project, a temporary platform was built over the southbound express track to allow northbound trains to stop at the station. The platform was then removed for Phase 2B. For Phase 3A a temporary platform was built over the northbound express track to allow southbound trains to stop. Reconstruction of the Fourth Avenue station was completed in April 2013. As part of the project, the arch bridge over Fourth Avenue was restored with the elimination of billboards and the removal of paint over the windows. The station received a public address system as part of the project. In addition, the MTA reopened the east station house to the station, after it had been closed for over 40 years.

Before 2009, G service terminated at Smith–Ninth Streets, one stop to the north. Terminating southbound trains used the switches just west of Fourth Avenue to enter the southbound express tracks. After being stored on the southbound express track, the G trains would start their Queens-bound runs by using the switches to enter the northbound local track. The switches were taken out of regular service in 2009, when the viaduct's reconstruction started and the G was extended to Church Avenue.

=== Planned accessibility ===
As part of its 2025–2029 Capital Program, the MTA has proposed making the station wheelchair-accessible in compliance with the Americans with Disabilities Act of 1990.

== Station layout ==
=== Exits ===
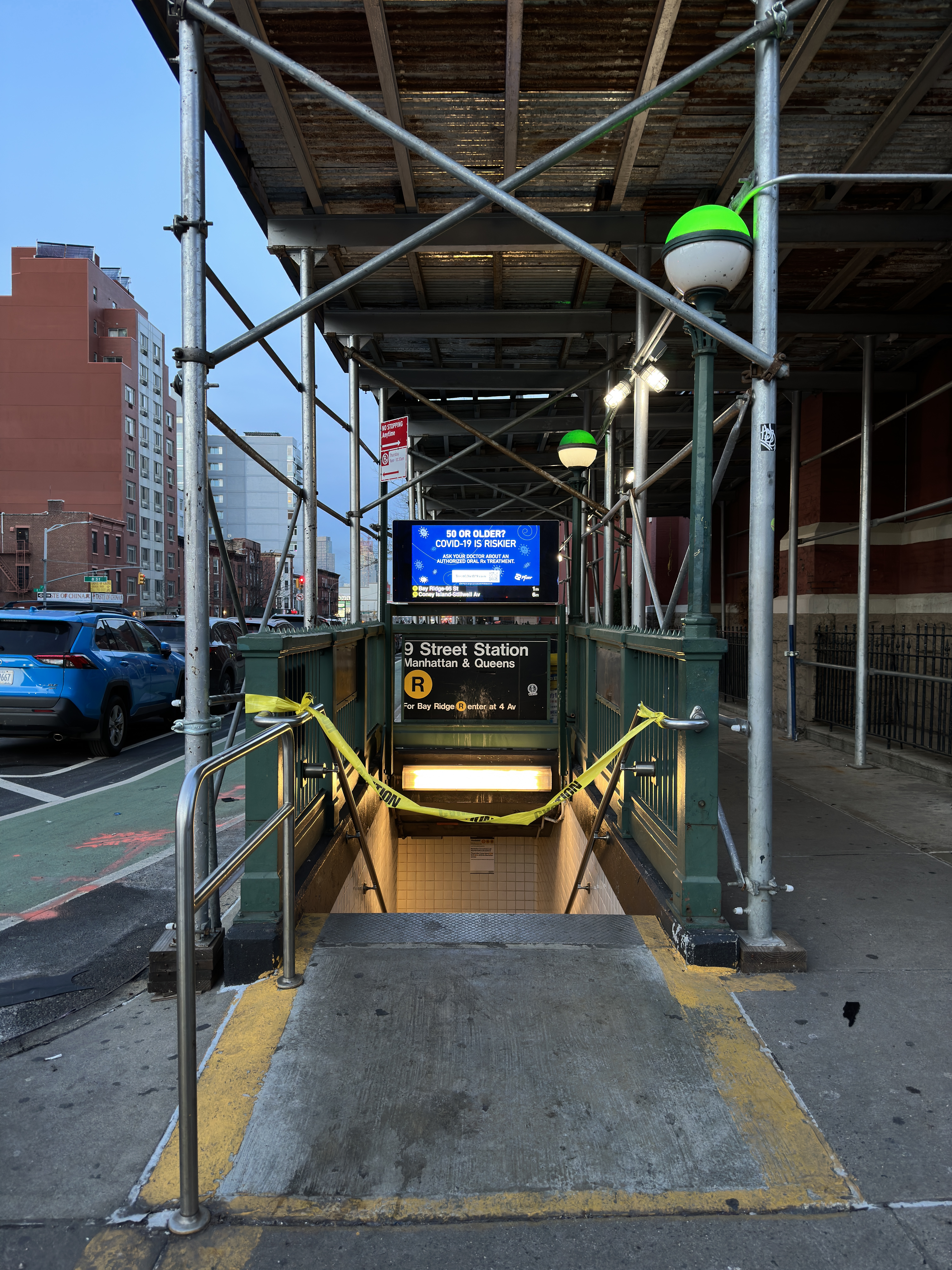
Entrance at the NE corner of 4th Avenue & 9th Street

Exit location	Exit type	Number of exits	Platform served
Building on the west side of 4th Avenue between 9th and 10th Streets	Two doorways	1	Southbound Fourth Avenue Line Both Culver Line platforms
Building on the east side of 4th Avenue between 9th and 10th Streets	Two doorways	1	Northbound Fourth Avenue Line Both Culver Line platforms
NW corner of 4th Avenue and 9th Street	Staircase	1	Southbound Fourth Avenue Line
NE corner of 4th Avenue and 9th Street	Staircase	1	Northbound Fourth Avenue Line

This station has four entrances. There are three doorways to common fare areas to large buildings on both sides of 4th Avenue between 9th and 10th Streets. Each building has two doorways to 4th Avenue and one to 10th Street. The other two are entrances on either northern corner of 4th Avenue and 9th Street, and lead directly to the BMT Fourth Avenue Line platforms.

== IND Culver Line platforms ==
4 Avenue
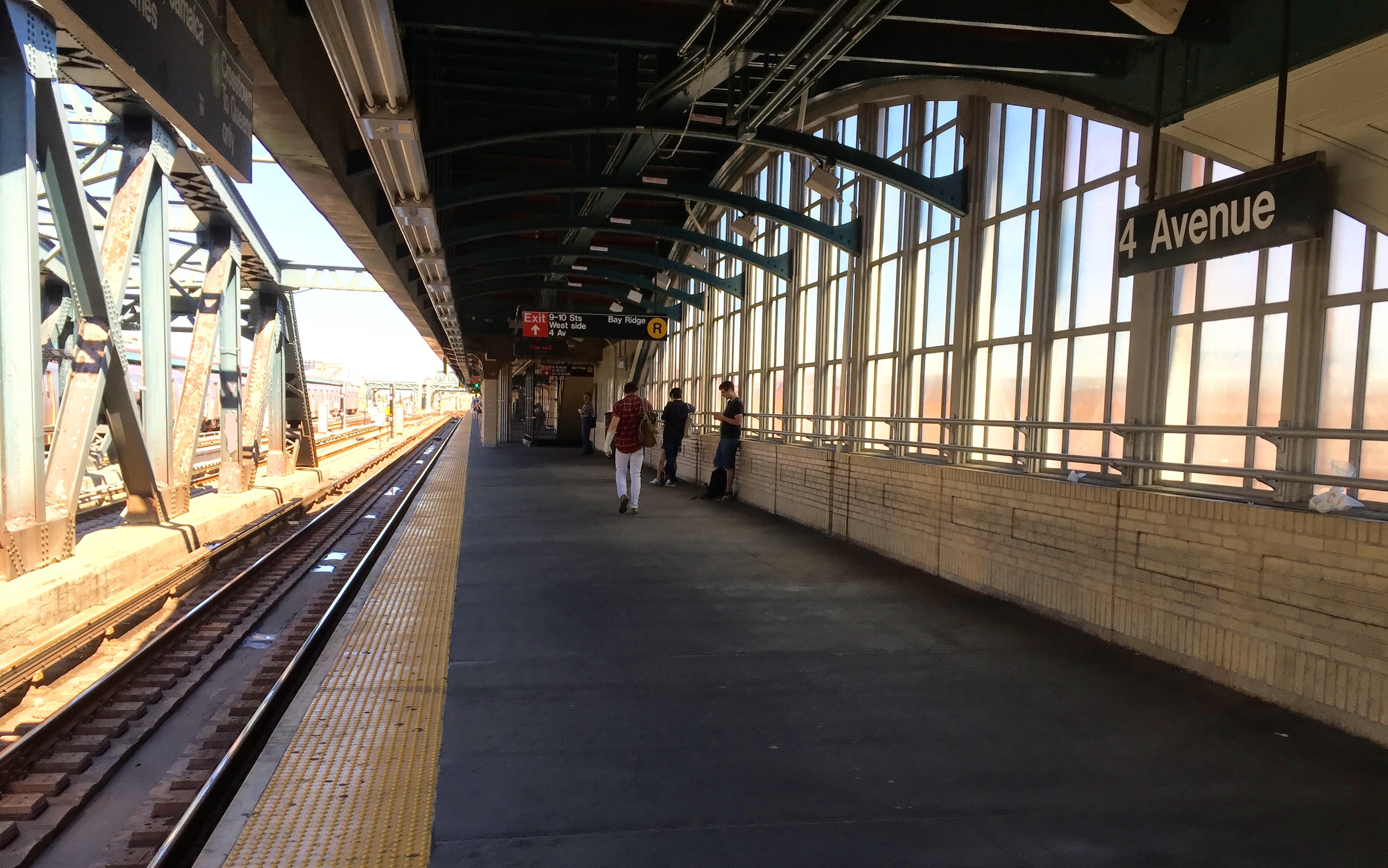
- Manhattan/Queens-bound platform

Station statistics
- Division: B (IND)
- Line: IND Culver Line
- Services: F (all times); G (all times)
- Structure: Elevated
- Platforms: 2 side platforms
- Tracks: 4

Other information
- Opened: October 7, 1933; 93 years ago
- Accessible: No; planned
Services
Preceding station	New York City Subway	Following station
Smith–Ninth Streets via Bergen Street	Local	Seventh Avenue via Church Avenue
does not stop here
Track layout
Station service legend
Symbol	Description
Stops all times	Stops all times
- 4th Avenue Station (IND)
- U.S. National Register of Historic Places
- New York State Register of Historic Places
- MPS: New York City Subway System MPS
- NRHP reference No.: 05000673
- NYSRHP No.: 04701.015594

Significant dates
- Added to NRHP: July 6, 2005
- Designated NYSRHP: May 11, 2005

The Fourth Avenue station (announced as Fourth Avenue-Ninth Street) is a local station on the IND Culver Line that has four tracks and two side platforms. The station is between Smith–Ninth Streets to the north and Seventh Avenue to the south. It along with Smith–Ninth Streets are the only two elevated stations in the original IND system, both located on the 1-mile (1.6 km) Culver Viaduct crossing over the Gowanus Canal. The platforms are the IND's usual length of 660 feet (200 m), and the width of the platforms is 16 feet (4.9 m). Both platforms have tan brick windscreens with covered-up windows and column-less cantilevered canopies along their entire lengths except for a small portion of the west (railroad north) end.

At the east (railroad south) end of the station, the line crosses over Fourth Avenue atop an Art Deco truss arch bridge, consisting of massive steel arches with glass panes forming the outer walls of the station and platforms; each arch is anchored between two limestone-and-brick towers, one on either side of the arch. Running along the top of the arches are straight brick piers with patterns. Above the four tracks is an additional truss structure. The windows of the arches were formerly painted over, while billboards were affixed to the outside of each arch; these were removed in the 2012 renovation.

Each bridge tower is four-stories tall, constructed of buff brick with granite bases. The uppermost floor of each tower contains crew quarters located above both platforms, while the bottom two stories contain the station's exits (see below). Characteristic of the Art Deco style, the crew quarters towers contain small setbacks. Repeating chevron designs are located along the center of each tower, while limestone bands are located atop the parapets and setbacks on each tower.

=== Exits ===
There are two fare control areas at the east end of the station, within street-level Art Deco station houses at the base of the two bridge towers. Both station houses have walls fitted with rectangular yellow tiles and rectangular green tile band accents, unique from typical IND tilework. Numerous green IND-style directional mosaics read "Coney Island" and "Manhattan" near each respective platform, along with mosaics reading "To Street", and those reading "BMT Subway" at the transfer stairs to the BMT platforms. Both station houses also have their original illuminated IND "SUBWAY" signs above their street entrances. Storefronts are located within each station house at ground level.

The western station house within the western tower has three staircases from each platform going down to an I-shaped mezzanine. The two sides of the mezzanine are connected by a narrow open-air footbridge overlooking the ground level, allowing crossovers between the two platforms. In the center of the footbridge are now-closed public restrooms, identified by green mosaics reading "MEN" and "WOMEN". Two staircases lead down from the mezzanine to street level, with a turnstile bank to exit the station, and a single staircase going down to the extreme south end of the Bay Ridge-bound platform of Ninth Street BMT station. Outside fare control, there is a token booth and two sets of entry/exit doors, one to the west side of Fourth Avenue directly underneath the viaduct and the other to the north side of Tenth Street.

The eastern station house was reopened for entrance from the street in February 2012 during the Culver Viaduct Rehabilitation Project; prior to that, it was only used for crossovers and transfers. It has a similar layout to the western station house, with a street entrance on the east side of Fourth Avenue and a second at 10th Street, and a single staircase within fare control going down to the extreme south end of the Manhattan-bound platform of the BMT station. However, the mezzanine level in the station house is closed to the public, with a single staircase going up from fare control to the east end of each IND platform.

=== Track layout ===
At the west end of the station is the 4th Avenue Interlocking, which was historically used by G trains terminating at Smith–Ninth Streets (see below) to layover and reverse direction. The interlocking is controlled by a concrete signal tower at the west end of the Manhattan-bound platform. Farther west between 4th Avenue and Smith–Ninth Streets was a short stub-end reversing spur accessible only from the 4th Avenue station. The spur, located between the two express tracks, remained level while the other tracks ramped up toward Smith–Ninth Streets. The track was removed during the overhaul of the Culver Viaduct from 2007 to 2013. East of this station, the line enters a tunnel toward Seventh Avenue. That station is underground, but at a higher altitude than this elevated station due to the steep slope of the land (hence the neighborhood name of Park Slope).

=== Service patterns ===
The station was originally served by the A train. In 1936, the A was rerouted to the IND Fulton Street Line and was replaced by E trains from the Queens Boulevard Line. In 1937, the connection to the IND Crosstown Line opened and GG (later renamed the G) trains were extended to Church Avenue, complementing the E. In December 1940, after the IND Sixth Avenue Line opened, E trains were replaced by the F, and the GG was cut back to Smith–Ninth Streets. Following the completion of the Culver Ramp in 1954, D Concourse Express trains replaced F service to Coney Island. In November 1967, the Chrystie Street Connection opened and D trains were rerouted via the Manhattan Bridge and the BMT Brighton Line to Coney Island. F trains were extended once again via the Culver Line.

The station acted as a local-only station from 1968 to 1976, when F trains ran express in both directions between Bergen Street and Church Avenue during rush hours. G trains were extended from Smith–Ninth Streets to Church Avenue to provide local service. Express service between Bergen and Church ended in 1976 due to budgetary concerns and passenger complaints, and the GG, later renamed the G, was again terminated at the Smith–Ninth Streets station.

In July 2009, the G was again extended from its terminus at Smith–Ninth Streets to a more efficient terminus at Church Avenue to accommodate the rehabilitation of the Culver Viaduct. The G extension was made permanent in July 2012. In July 2019, the MTA revealed plans to restore express service on the Culver Line between Jay Street and Church Avenue. Express service started on September 16, 2019.

=== Gallery ===
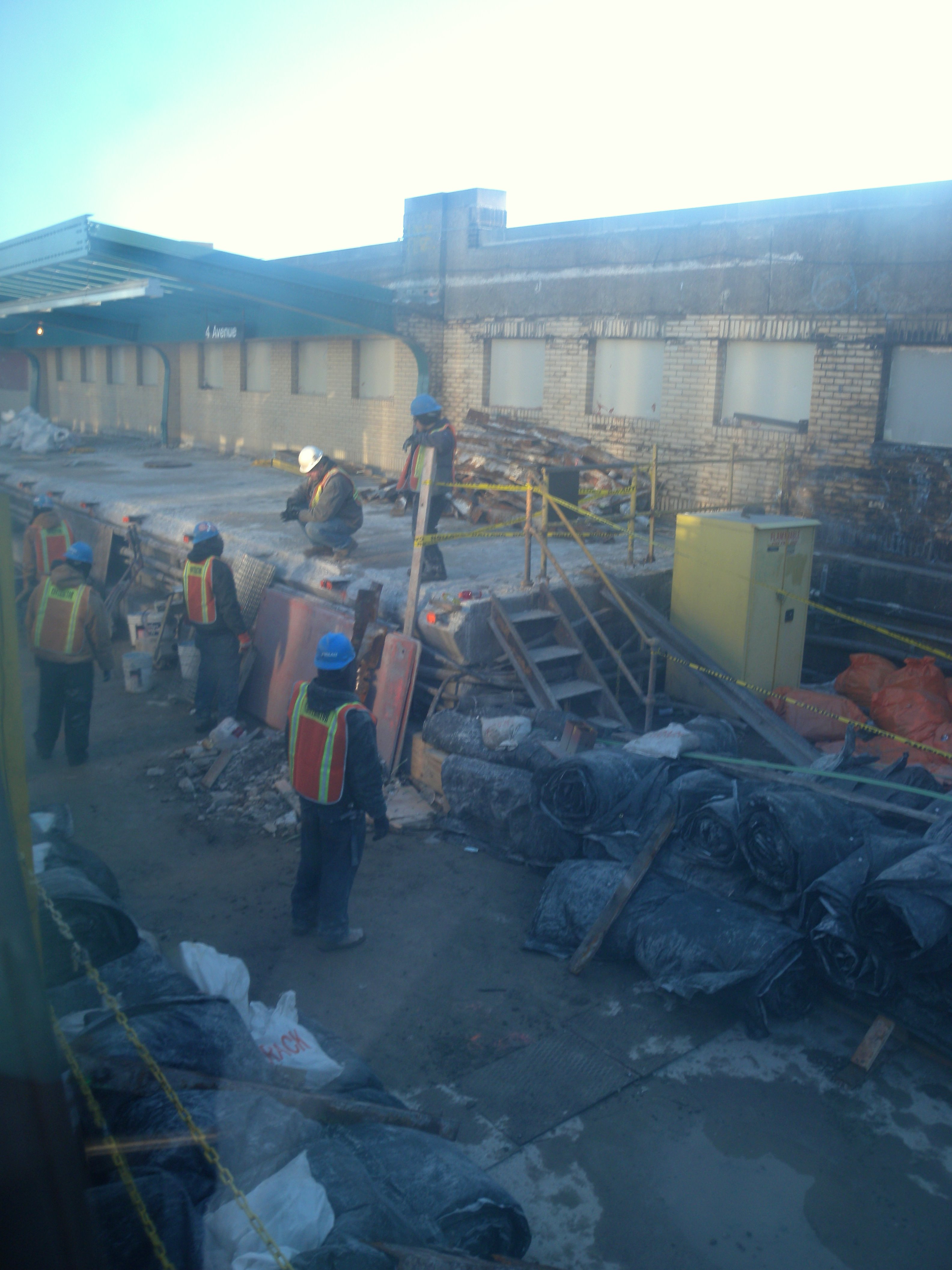
Demolition of the old platform during construction

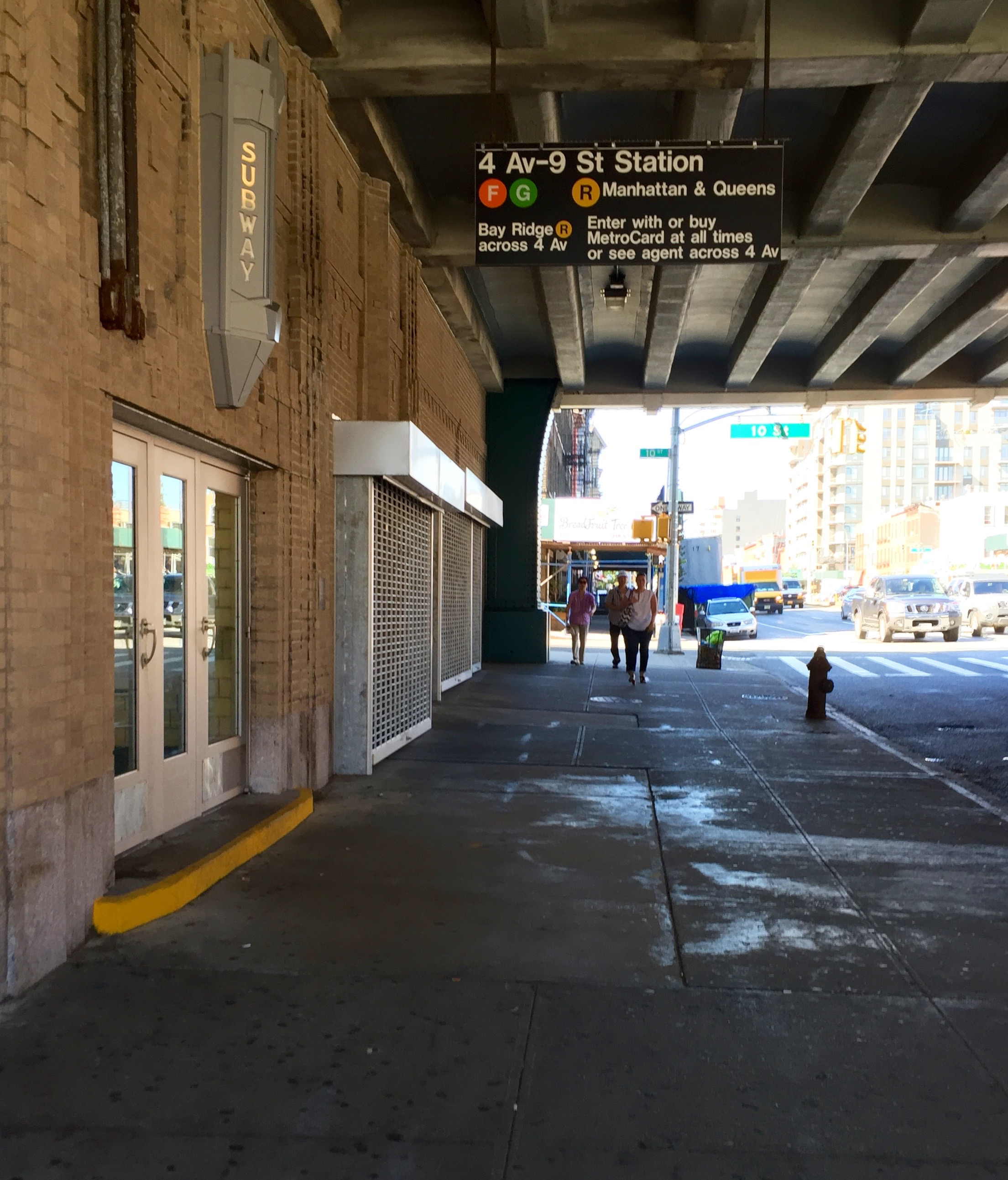
Entrance to the eastern station house under the 4th Avenue bridge

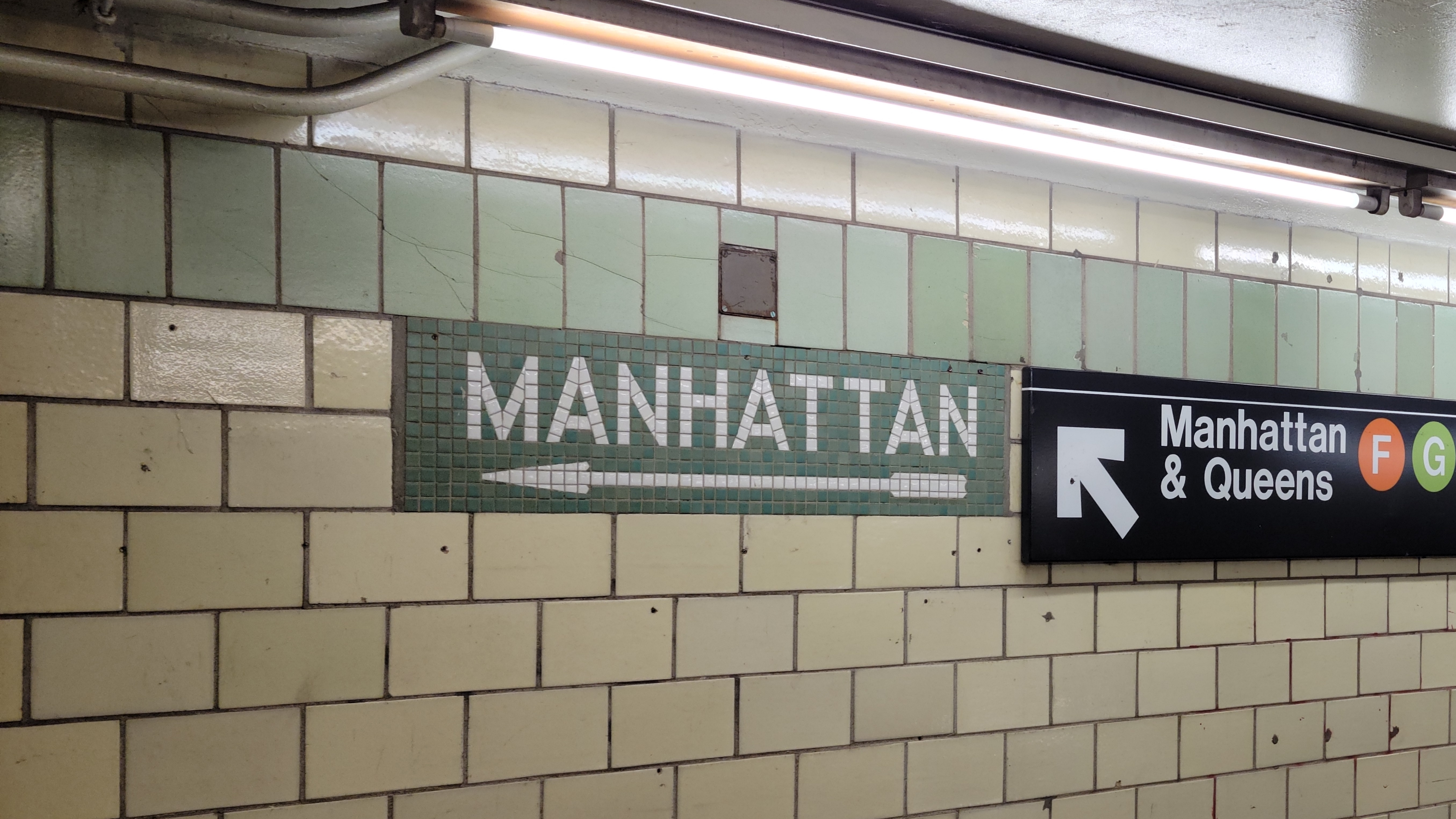
Mosaic and tilework in western station house

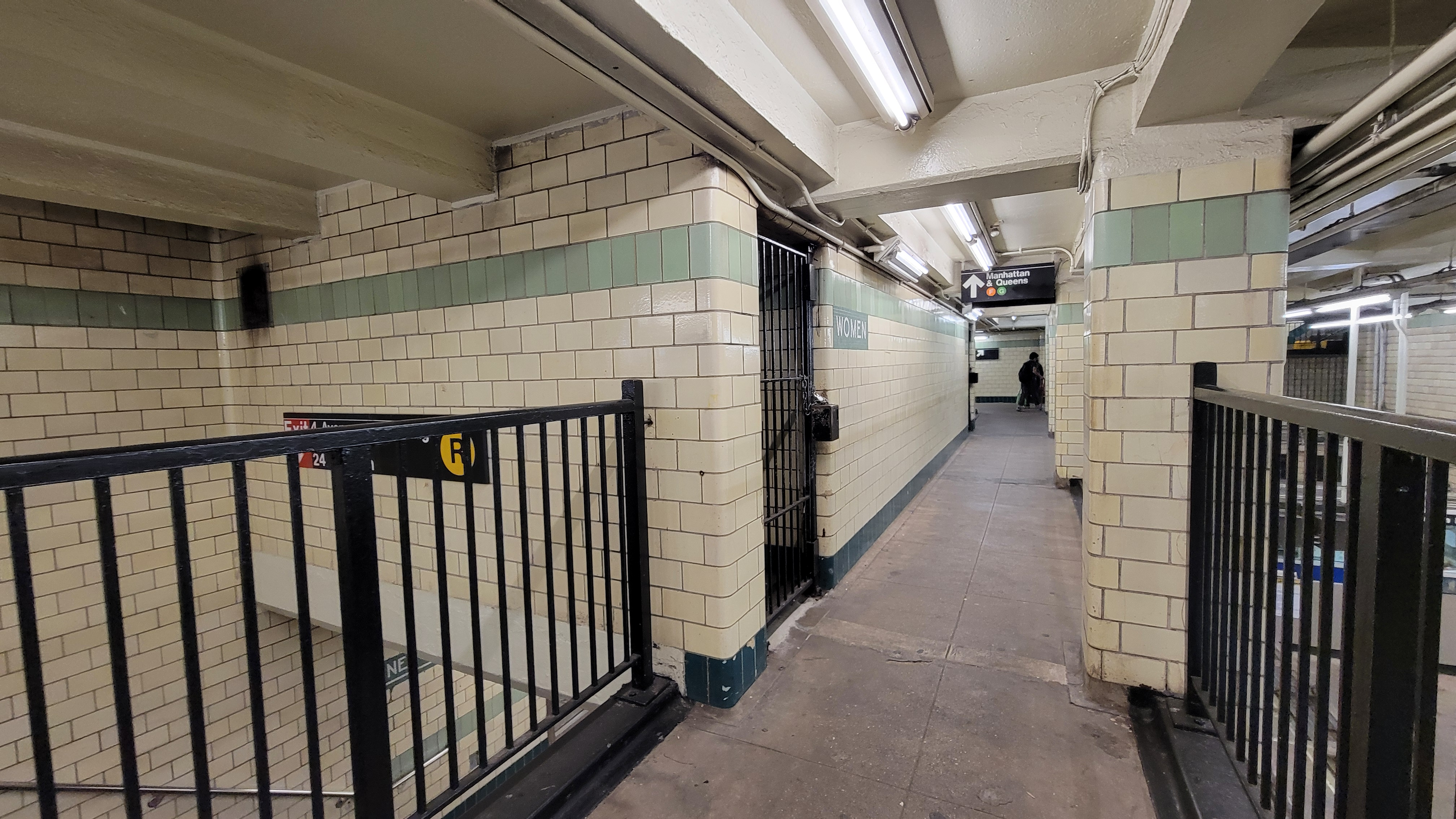
Mezzanine and former restrooms in western station house

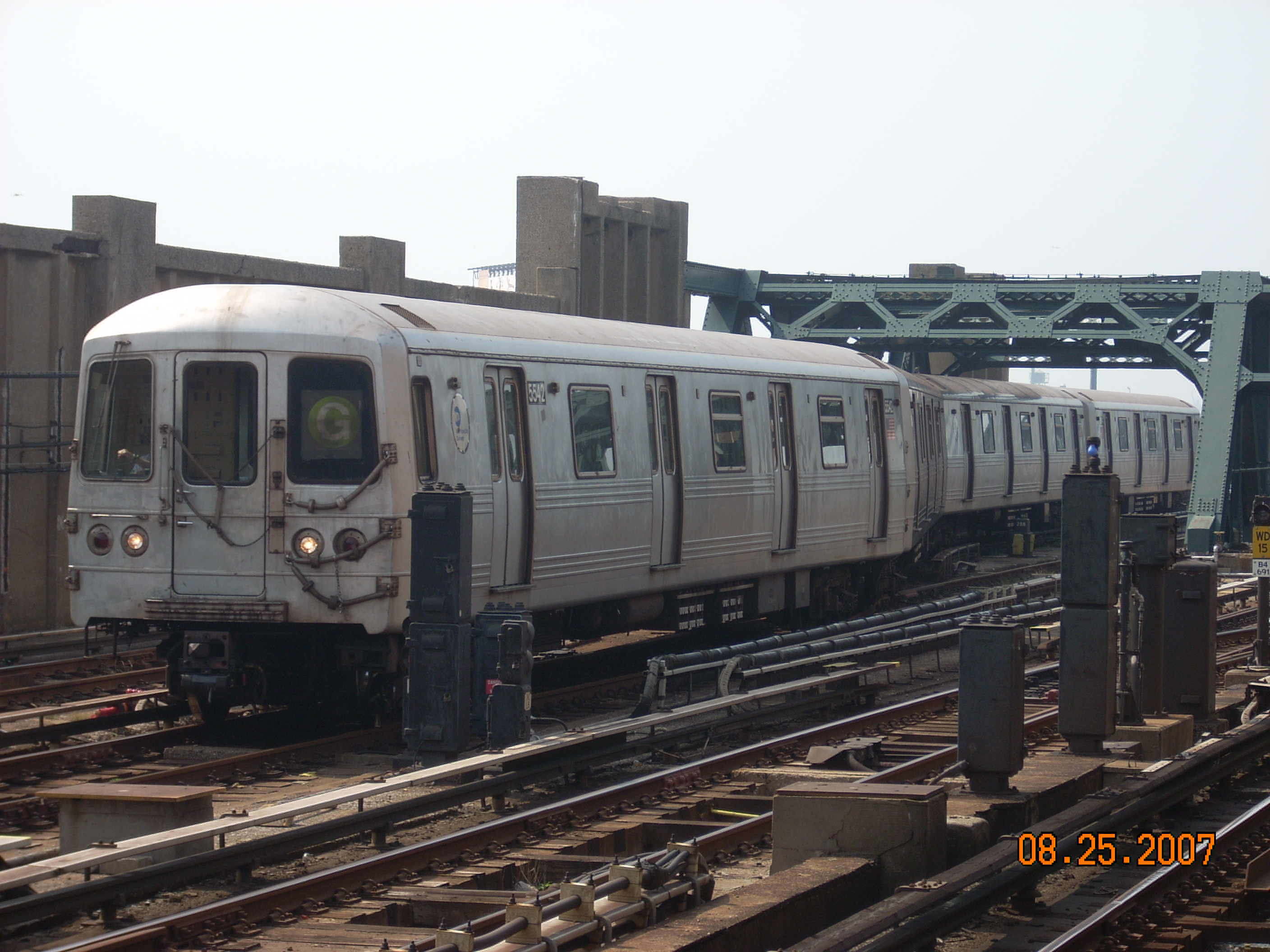
R46 G train switching tracks at Fourth Avenue, when G service terminated at Smith–Ninth Streets prior to July 2009

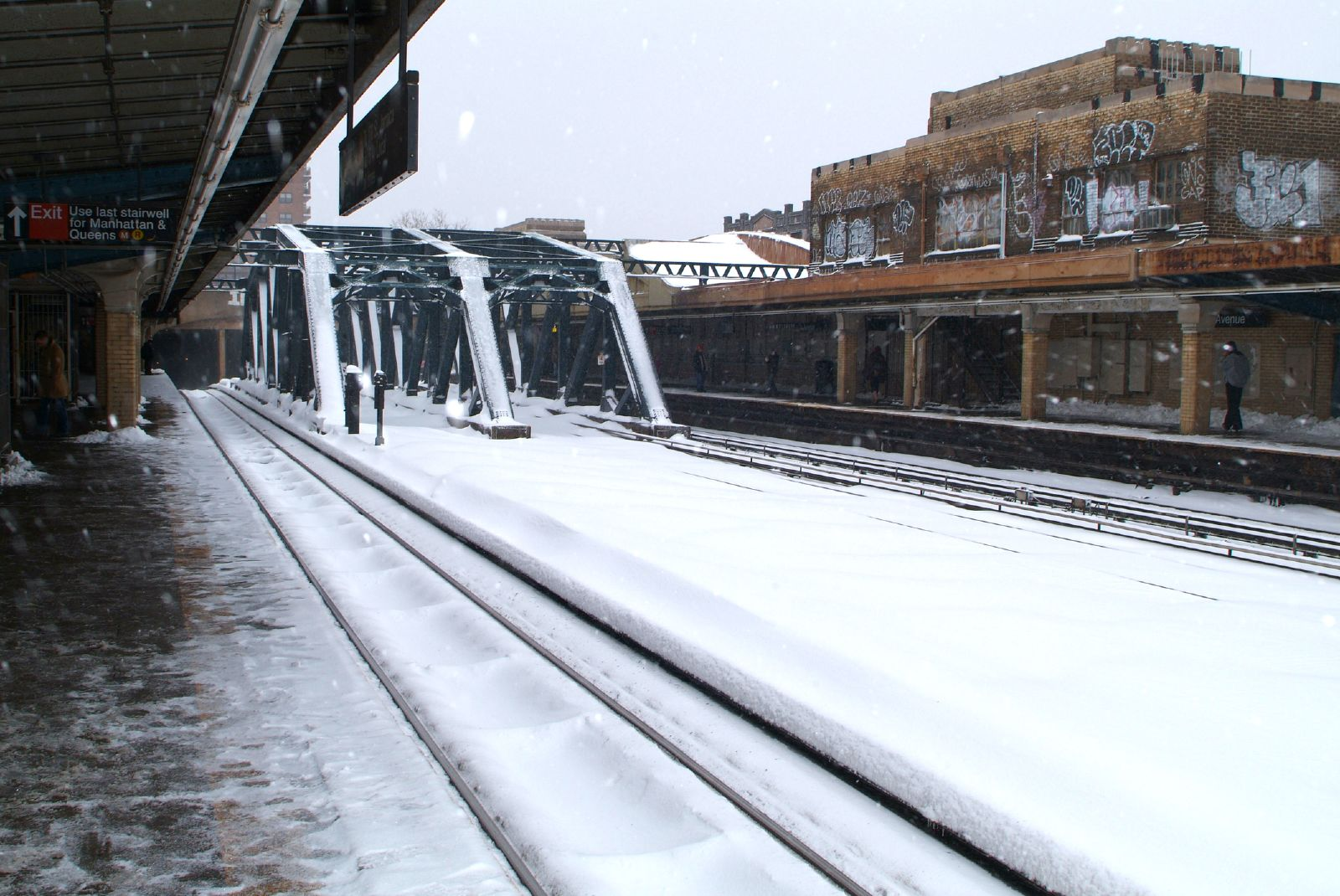
The platforms during snowfall in 2006

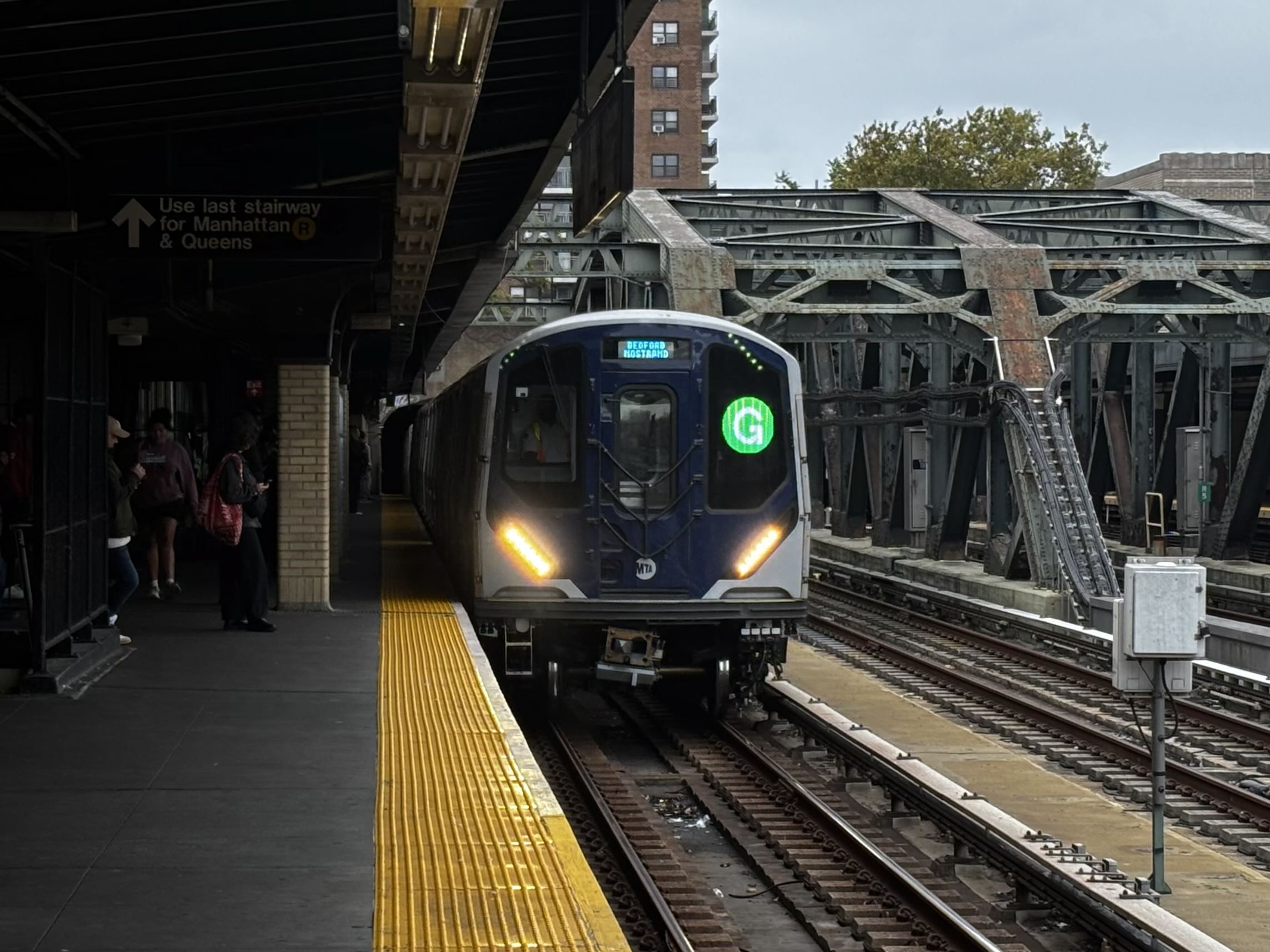
An R211 car arriving at the station in October 2025.

== BMT Fourth Avenue Line platforms ==
9 Street
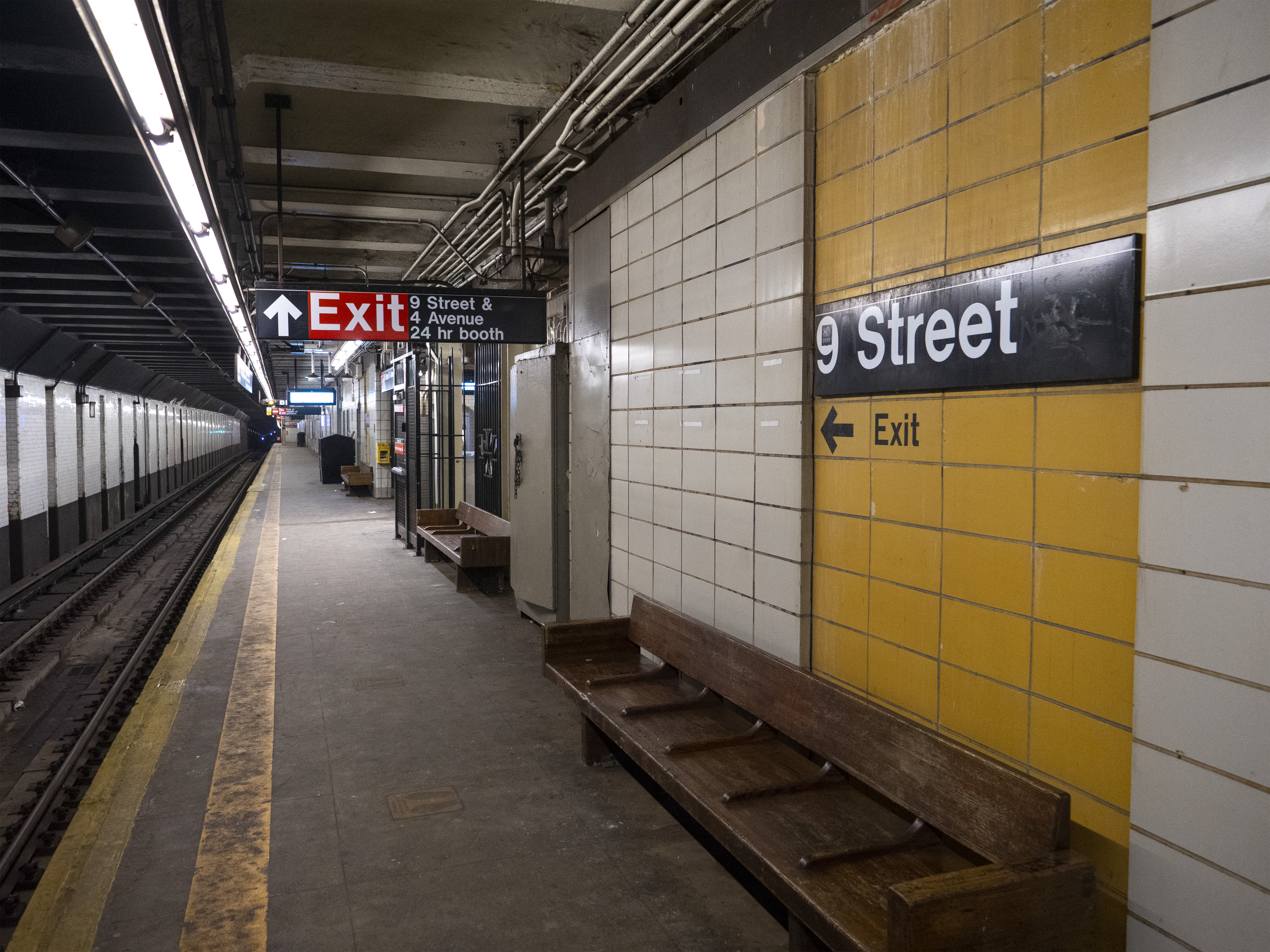
- Northbound platform

Station statistics
- Division: B (BMT)
- Line: BMT Fourth Avenue Line
- Services: D (late nights); N (late nights, and limited rush hour service in the reverse-peak direction); R (all times); W (limited rush hour service only)
- Structure: Underground
- Platforms: 2 side platforms
- Tracks: 4

Other information
- Opened: June 22, 1915; 111 years ago
- Accessible: No; planned
Services
Preceding station	New York City Subway	Following station
Union Street D N R W toward Forest Hills–71st Avenue	Local	Prospect Avenue D N R W toward Bay Ridge–95th Street
Track layout
Station service legend
Symbol	Description
Stops all times except late nights	Stops all times except late nights
Stops late nights only	Stops late nights only
Stops rush hours only	Stops rush hours only
Stops rush hours in the peak direction only	Stops rush hours in the peak direction only

The Ninth Street station (also announced as Fourth Avenue-Ninth Street) on the BMT Fourth Avenue Line is a local station that has four tracks and two side platforms. The station is between Union Street to the north and Prospect Avenue to the south. White tiled curtain walls separate the express tracks from the local tracks, with several openings that allow a view of the tracks from the platforms. The walls were intended to improve ventilation, as passing trains would push air forward, rather than to the sides of the tunnel. Beige columns run along both platforms at the station's northern end where they were extended in 1970. The ceiling is lower in this section.

Prior to the station's 1970 renovation, it was finished all in white and marble tile, and it had its own color scheme to allow regular passengers to identify the station based only on the color of the marble trimmings. Since the renovation, the station walls have consisted of white cinderblock tiles, except for small recesses in the walls, which contain yellow-painted cinderblock tiles. The yellow cinderblock field contains the station-name signs and black text pointing to the exits.

Each platform has one same-level fare control area in the middle. The one on the Manhattan-bound platform has a turnstile bank, token booth, and one staircase going up to the northeast corner of Ninth Street and Fourth Avenue. This fare control area still has the station's original trim line with "9" tablets at regular intervals. The fare control area on the Bay Ridge-bound platform is unstaffed, containing one High Entry/Exit Turnstile, one exit-only turnstile, a row of four low turnstiles, and a staircase to the northwest corner of Ninth Street and Fourth Avenue. A small section of the original trim line is visible here as well.

At the extreme south end of both platforms, staircases lead up to the IND station houses at street level, with additional staircases up to both IND platforms. The Bay Ridge-bound BMT platform feeds into the western station house, the Manhattan-bound platform to the eastern station house. Crossovers for the BMT station are via the IND platforms.

=== Gallery ===
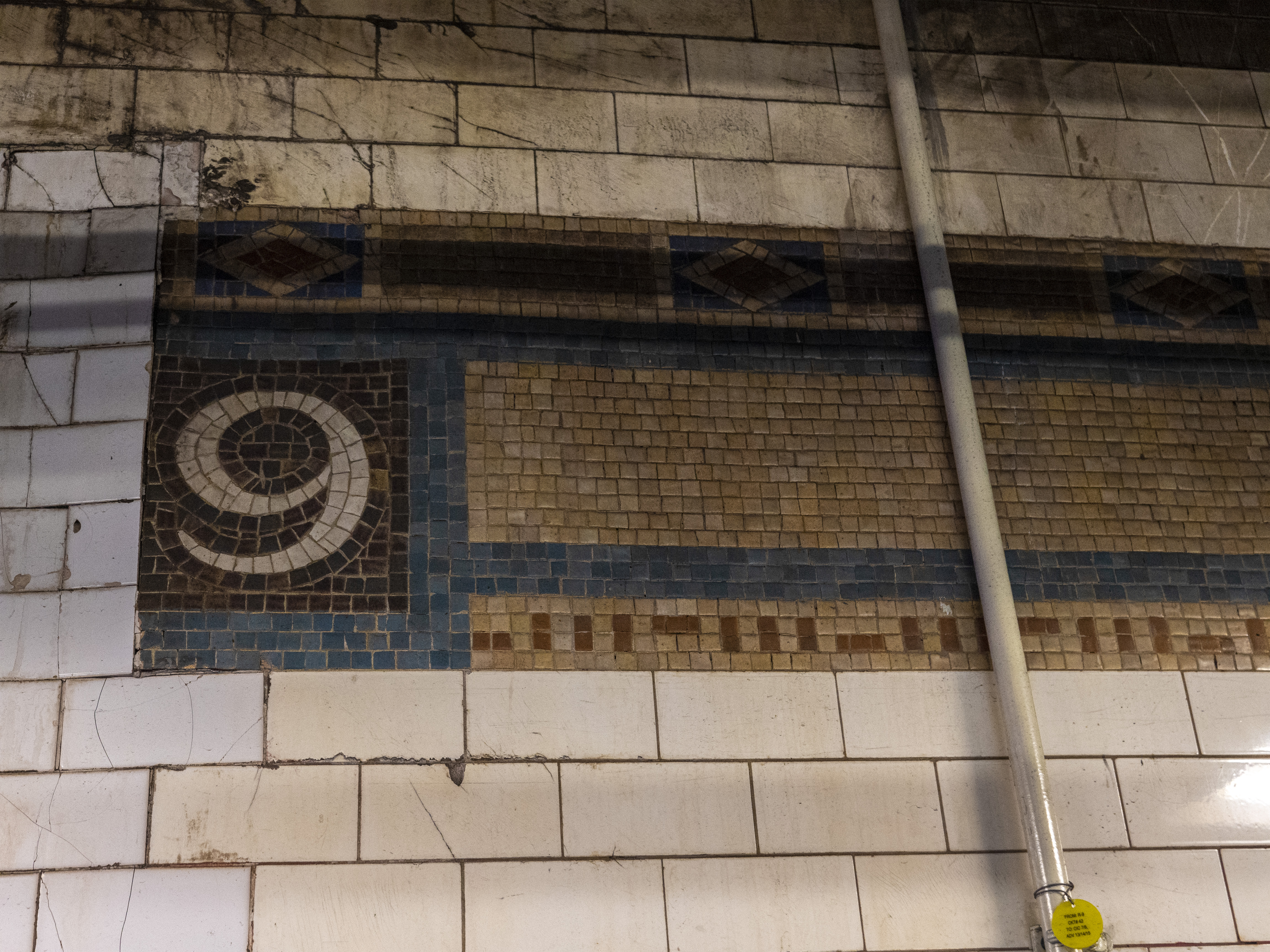
Original mosaic trim remnant in the southbound fare area

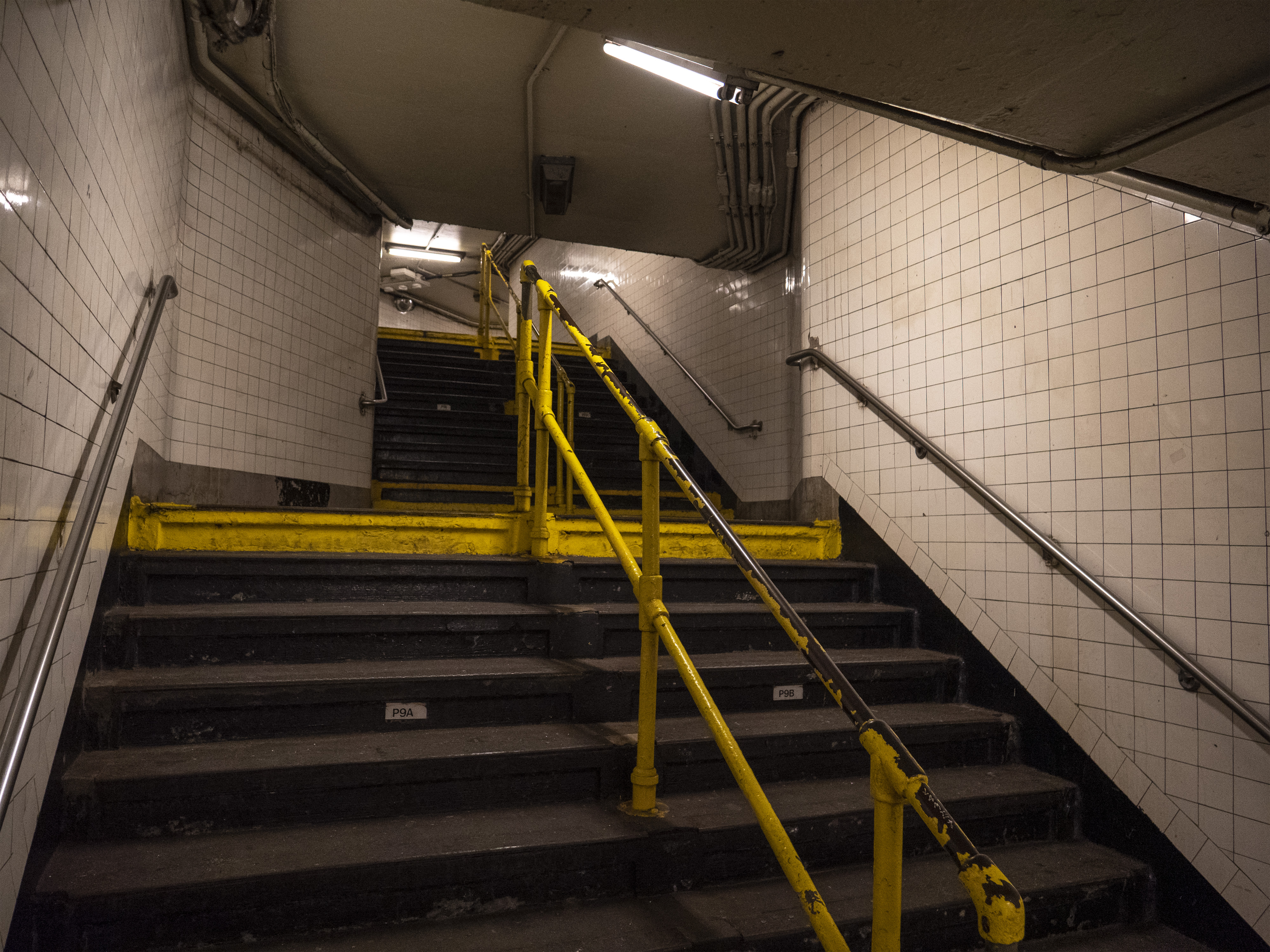
Stairs leading up to street level and the IND station

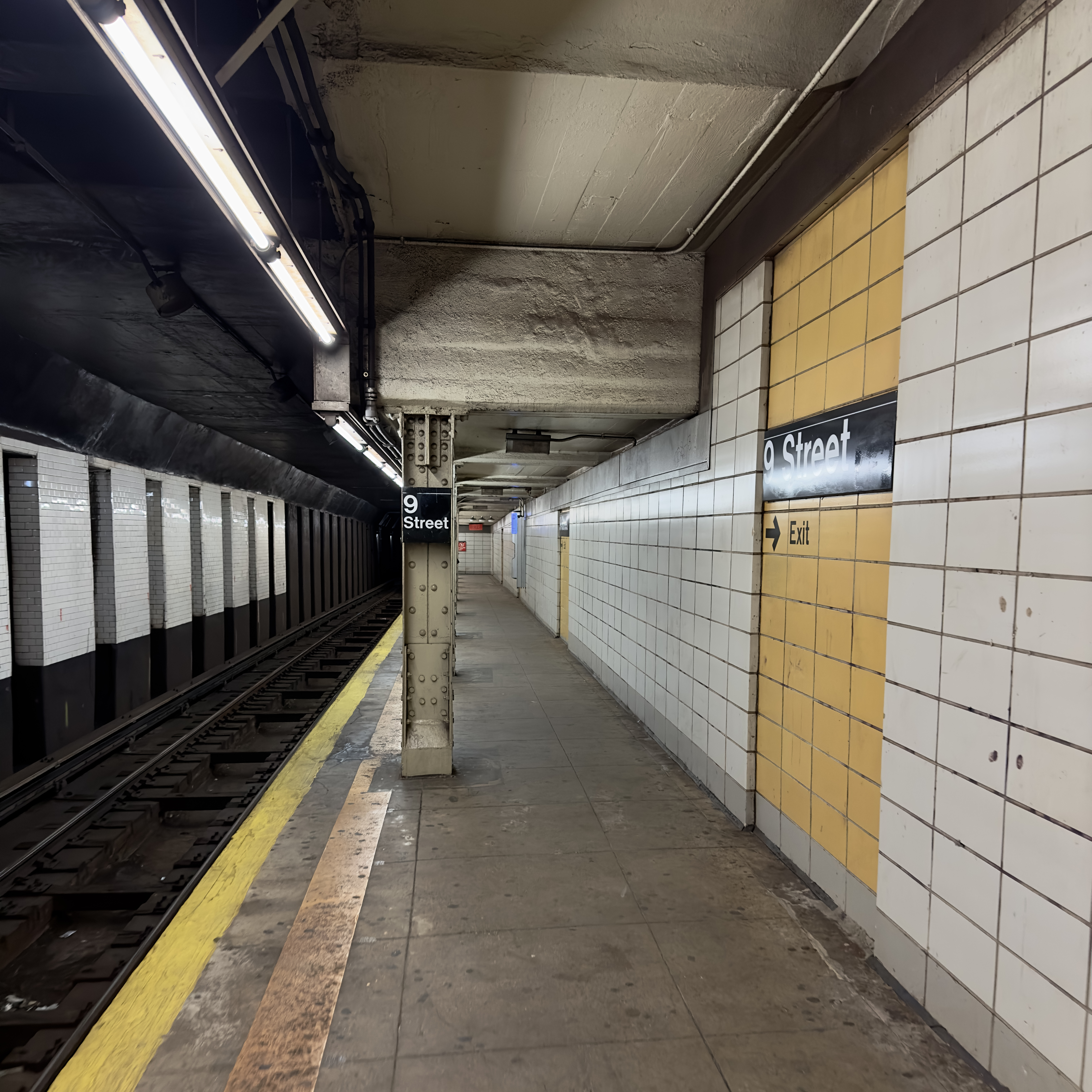
Evidence of platform extensions

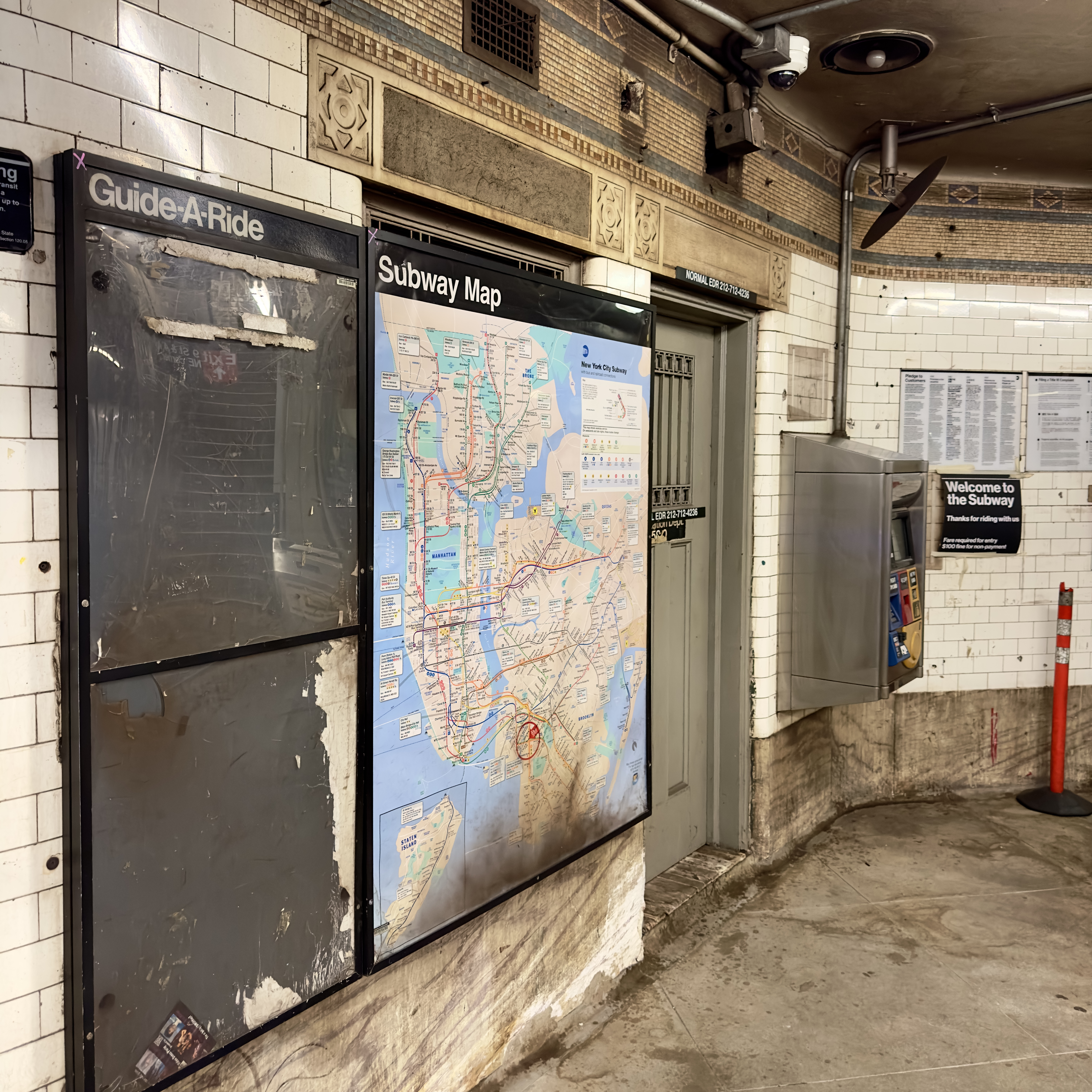
Blocked off doors at the northbound fare control area

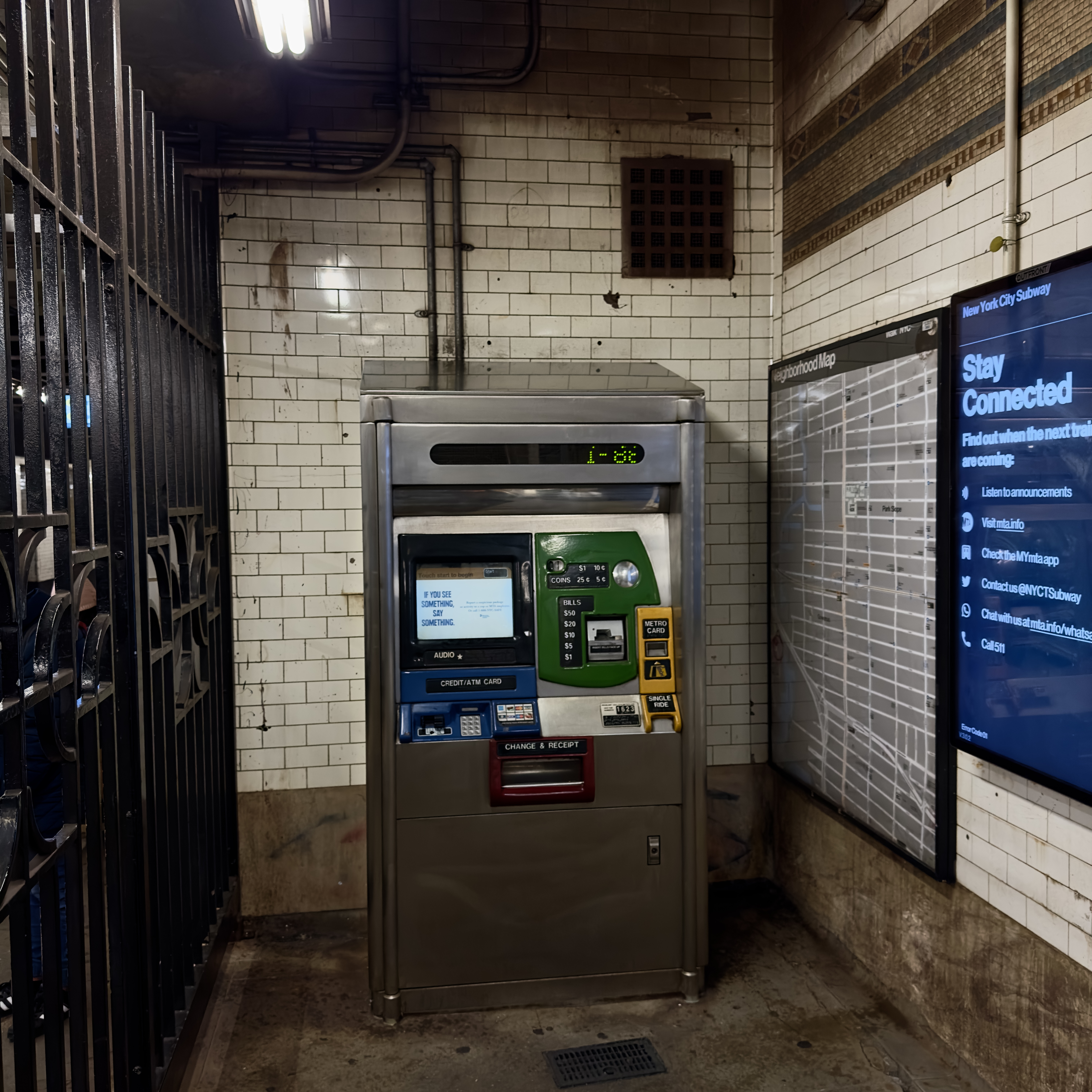
A MVM fronting the original tiled wall at the northbound fare control area

== See also ==
- National Register of Historic Places listings in Brooklyn
