= Gritten =

Gritten is a surname with English locational origin from Gretton in Gloucestershire or Shropshire, or Girton in Cambridgeshire or Nottinghamshire. Modernization of some names also happen thus resulting to the surname's many variations including Girton, Girtin, Gurton, Gritton, Gritten, etc..

Notable people with the surname include:

- Henry Gritten (1818–1873), English-Australian artist
- William George Howard Gritten (1870–1943), British politician

== See also ==
Gritton
