= Gowanus Canal Conservancy =

- Formation: 2009; 17 years ago
- Type: Nonprofit
- Tax ID no.: 26-0681729
- Legal status: 501(c)(3)
- Headquarters: Brooklyn, New York
- Website: https://www.gowanuscanalconservancy.org

The Gowanus Canal Conservancy is a nonprofit conservancy founded in 2009 that serves as a community-based environmental steward of the Gowanus Canal in Brooklyn, New York City. Partnering with the EPA, the city Department of Environmental Protection (NYCDEP), groups like Riverkeeper and universities as diverse as Brooklyn Law School, SUNY Environmental Science and Forestry at Syracuse, and Rutgers, it seeks to improve the canal's water quality while promoting local green spaces and building habitats for the fauna that live in or near the waterway.

With the population of the area increasing, the Conservancy is concerned about the risk that Combined Sewage Overflows will cause untreated waste to flood the waterway. The GCC advocates for equitable rezoning as a way to address several problems including sewage overflows in the canal. They advocated for the implementation of the Uniform Land Use Review Procedure for Gowanus rezoning, which will begin in 2021. This process was delayed by lawsuits from groups claiming that virtual meetings did not afford sufficient opportunity for community participation.

In 2012, the GCC hosted a panel by the Climate Reality Project which emphasized that the danger of flooding in the canal would increase due to climate change. Richard Kampf, a GCC board member and environmental consultant, argues that climate change should be taken into consideration in canal remediation plans. In 2019, the canal experienced extreme flooding, and the GCC again called for additional attention to this problem. They have also argued for tree canopies to prevent heat waves in the area, which may be exacerbated by climate change.

In 2019, the GCC ran a small trial to monitor whether trees are effective in absorbing polluted rainwater, preventing it from seeping into the canal. To accomplish this, they purchased sensors that could send data to a cloud-based metrics platform and attached the sensors to six trees. The results suggested that maintenance of the trees improves their ability to absorb storm water. Other conservation organizations in New York have adopted similar approaches.

The Gownaus Canal Conservancy partners with the Brooklyn School for Collaborative Studies to offer the Gowanus Blue Schools Design Challenge, which was featured in a collection of New York City climate resources compiled by the New York City Department of Environmental Protection.

Twenty to forty volunteers turn up for the events that the conservancy organizes. There are monthly composting events using compost culled at the city's many Greenmarkets.

The New York Community Trust awarded the Gowanus Canal Conservancy a $130,000 grant for land use and public investment in 2019.
