= Gowanus Canal =

Canal in Brooklyn, New York

- Superfund site
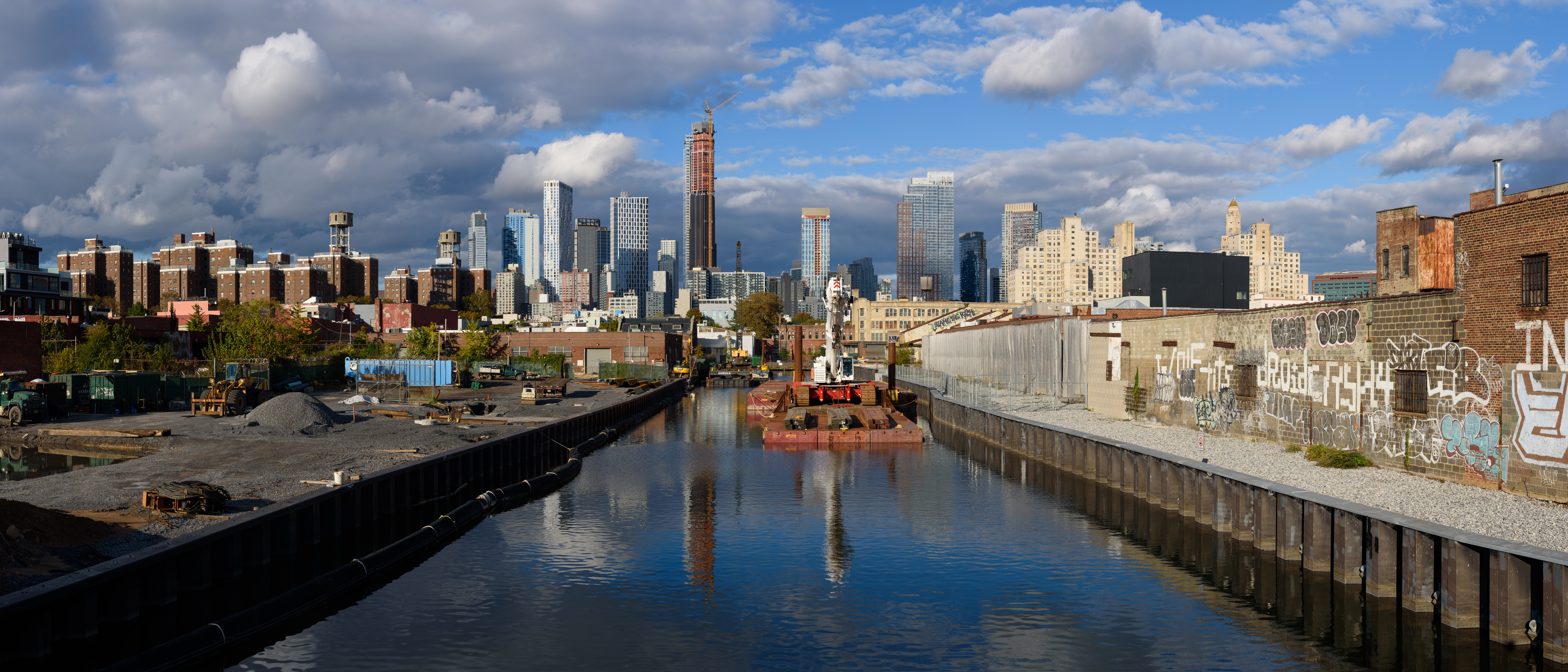
- View from Union Street Bridge
- Map of the canal and its crossings
- Location: Brooklyn, New York City, Kings, New York; 40°40′1″N 74°0′11″W

Information
- CERCLIS ID: NYN000206222
- Contaminants: PAHs, VOCs, PCBs, pesticides, metals

Progress
- Proposed: September 4, 2009
- Listed: April 3, 2010

The Gowanus Canal (originally known as Gowanus Creek) is a 1.8-mile-long (2.9 km) canal in the New York City borough of Brooklyn, on the westernmost portion of Long Island. Once a vital cargo transportation hub, the canal has seen decreasing use since the mid-20th century as domestic shipping declined. It continues to be used for occasional movement of goods and daily navigation of small boats, tugs, and barges. It is among the most polluted bodies of water in the United States.

Connected to Gowanus Bay in Upper New York Bay, the Gowanus Canal borders the neighborhoods of Red Hook, Carroll Gardens, and Gowanus, all within South Brooklyn, to the west; Park Slope to the east; Boerum Hill and Cobble Hill to the north; and Sunset Park to the south. Seven bridges or viaducts cross the canal, carrying, from north to south, Union Street, Carroll Street, Third Street, the New York City Subway's Culver Viaduct, Ninth Street, Hamilton Avenue, and the Gowanus Expressway.

The canal was created in the mid-19th century from local tidal wetlands and freshwater streams. For roughly a century, heavy industrial use poured pollutants into the canal. Various attempts to remove the pollution or dilute the canal's water have failed. High ratios of fecal coliforms, deadly proportions of pathogens, and a low concentration of oxygen have left it generally incompatible with macroscopic marine life, although a variety of extremophiles have been observed in the canal.

Despite the canal's heavy pollution, its proximity to Manhattan and upper-class Brooklyn neighborhoods is attracting concerted waterfront redevelopment. This has restarted calls for environmental cleanup, and prompted concerns that adjacent waterfront economic development would be incompatible with environmental restoration and environmental risks. It was designated a Superfund site in 2009, and work to clean up the canal began in 2013.

== Course ==
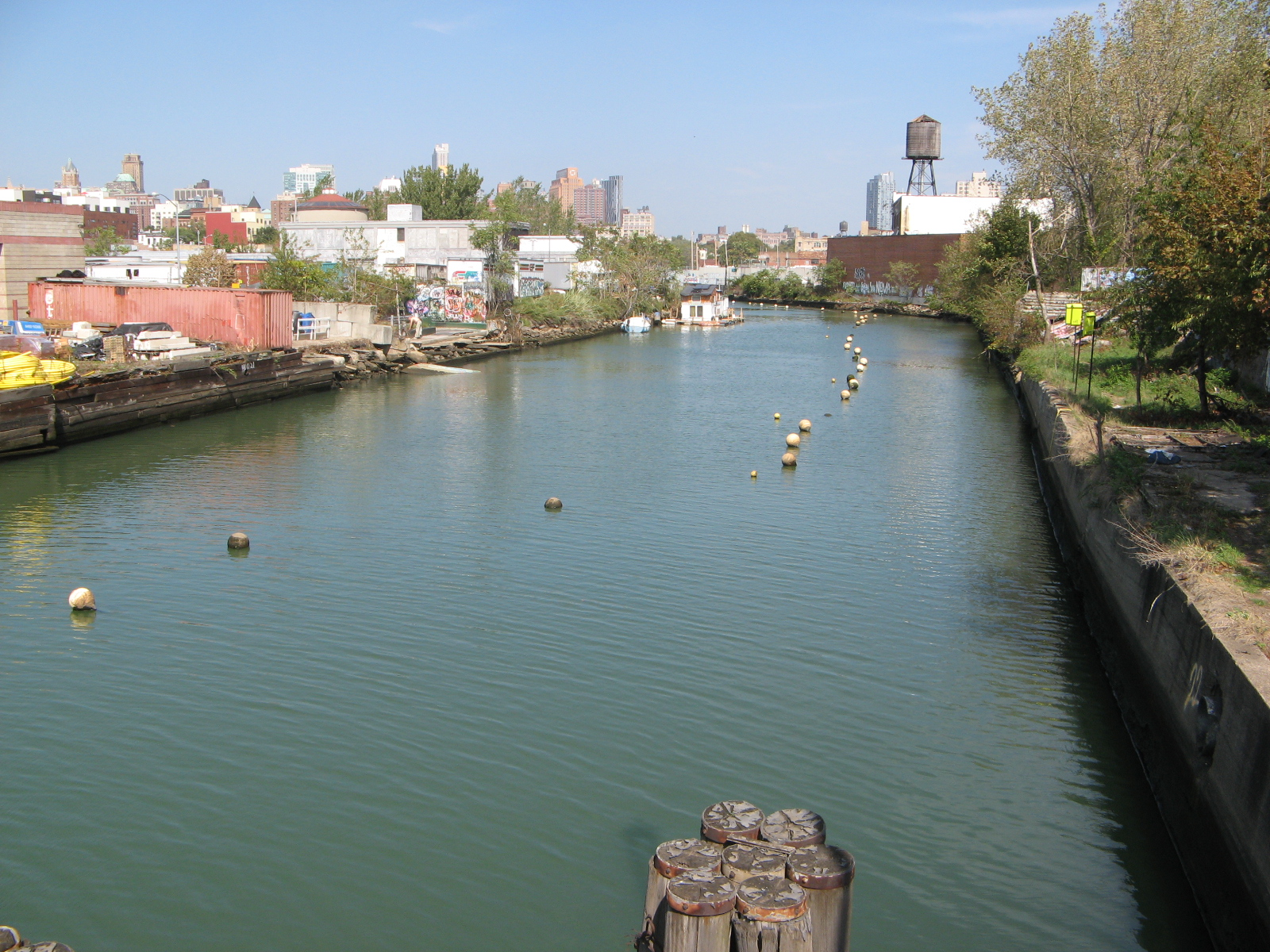
View of the canal from the Third Street Bridge in 2010

The Gowanus Canal begins at Butler Street in the neighborhood of Boerum Hill, in the northwestern part of Brooklyn. The wastewater pumping station at 201-234 Butler Street, a terracotta structure dating to 1911, is located north of the canal's head. The canal then runs in a south-southwest alignment parallel to the local street grid. Its course is located mid-block between Bond Street to the west and Nevins Street to the east. Along the way it passes bridges at Union Street, Carroll Street, and Third Street from south to north. While the Union Street and Third Street Bridges are movable bascule bridges, the Carroll Street Bridge is a retractable bridge that can be rolled diagonally to let ships through.

The western bank of the Gowanus Canal hosts a boat launch at Second Street. The Second Street boat launch is located adjacent to a "Sponge Park", which absorbs pollutants from the western bank before they can go into the canal. At Fourth Street, the Fourth Street Basin splits off to the east, while the Gowanus Canal proper turns west. A walkway with seating, built as part of the construction of a Whole Foods Market, is located on the north bank of the 4th Street Basin.

At Hoyt Street, two blocks west of Bond Street, the canal turns south with two extra tributaries at the east: one 480-foot-long (150 m) tributary at Seventh Street, and another 700-foot-long (210 m) near Sixth Street. Shortly afterward, it crosses under the Ninth Street Bridge, a vertical-lift bridge opened in 1999. The New York City Subway's Culver Viaduct, a 90-foot-tall (27 m) fixed-span viaduct, crosses above the Ninth Street Bridge. The viaduct contains the Smith–Ninth Streets station, which is partially located above the canal and is served by the F, <F>, and G trains. There is a short tributary to the east, about 185 feet (56 m) long, connecting to the parking lot of a Lowe's home-improvement store to the east, and Hamilton Plaza: a shopping center located at 1-37 12th Street which formerly housed a Pathmark supermarket and a Dunkin' Donuts directly to the south. At this point, a walkway leads from Lowe's north to Ninth Street along the northern bank of the tributary and the eastern bank of the canal. Owing to its hidden location, the waterfront promenade has seen little use.

At approximately 14th Street along the eastern bank, Hamilton Avenue and the Gowanus Expressway cross the canal at a diagonal from southeast to northwest, connecting to Lorraine Street on the western bank. Separate movable bascule bridges built in 1942 carry both directions of Hamilton Avenue's traffic, while the Gowanus Expressway rises on a viaduct far above the canal.

The Gowanus Canal's mouth is at the Gowanus Bay, a portion of Upper New York Bay bordering western Brooklyn. The mouth is located near 19th Street on the eastern bank, or Bryant Street on the western bank. The canal takes a north-northeasterly course from this point, running east of Smith Street. An asphalt plant and marine transfer station are located on the canal's eastern bank, as well as a Home Depot and a FedEx Shipping Center.

== History ==
=== Early history ===
==== Mill Creek ====
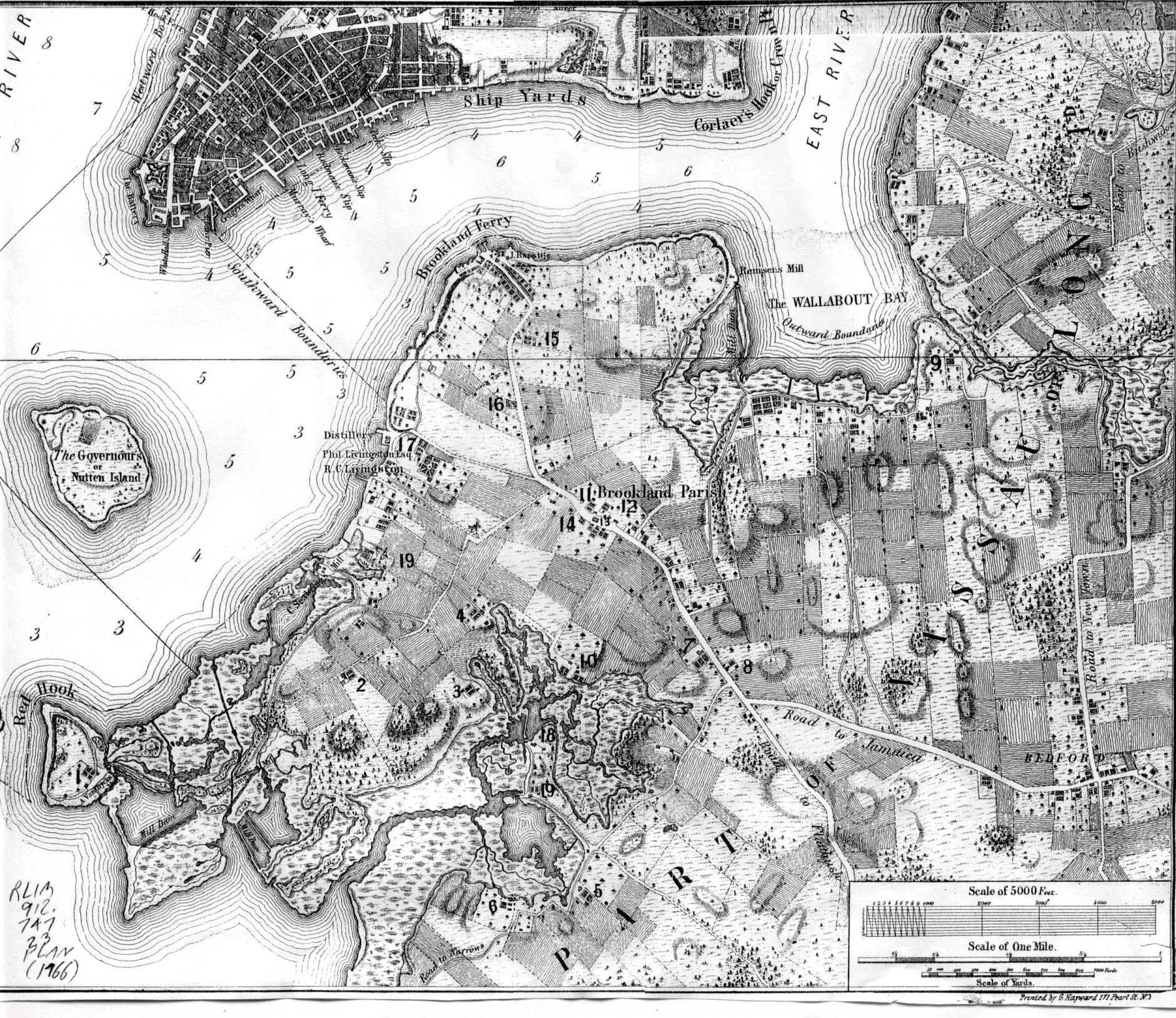
Map of Brooklyn in 1766, including Gowanus Creek

The Gowanus neighborhood originally surrounded Gowanus Creek. It consisted of a tidal inlet of navigable creeks in original saltwater marshland and meadows that contained wildlife. The Dutch government issued the first land patents within Breukelen (modern-day Brooklyn), including the land of the Gowanus, from 1630 to 1664. In 1636, the leaders of New Netherland bought the area around the Gowanus Bay. In 1639, the inhabitants swapped land claims with each other to build a tobacco plantation. The area's early settlers named the waterway "Gowanes Creek" after Gouwane, sachem (chief) of the local Lenape tribe called the Canarsee, who farmed on the shores.

Adam Brouwer, who had been a soldier in the service of the Dutch West India Company, built and operated the first tide-water gristmill patented in New York at Gowanus. The mill was located on land that was deeded on July 8, 1645, to Jan Evertse Bout. It was the first gristmill in the town of Breukelen and the first mill to operate in New Netherland. The mill was located north of Union Street, west of Nevins Street, and next to Bond Street. A second mill—Denton's Mill, also called Yellow Mill—was built on Denton's Mill Pond, after permission was granted to dredge from the creek to the mill pond once located between Fifth Avenue and the present-day canal at Carroll and Third Streets. On May 26, 1664, several Breuckelen residents, headed by Brouwer, petitioned Director General Peter Stuyvesant and his Council for permission to dredge a canal at their own expense through the land of Frederick Lubbertsen to supply water to run the mill. The petition was presented to the council on May 29, 1664, and the motion was granted. Another mill, Cole's Mill, was located just about at present day 9th Street, between Smith Street and the canal. Cole's Mill Pond, located north of 9th Street, occupied the present location of Public Place.

==== Farms and oyster fishing ====
In 1699, a settler named Nicholas Vechte built a farmhouse of brick and stone now known as the Old Stone House. In 1776, during the Battle of Long Island, American troops engaged British Army troops at the house, enabling General George Washington to relocate his troops behind American lines. This house sat at the southeastern edge of the Denton's Mill pond. Brower's Mill, also known as Freeks Mill or Brouwer's Mill, was located at the present-day intersection of Union and Nevins Streets. It can be seen in drawings depicting the Battle of Brooklyn.

Throughout this period, a few Dutch farmers settled along the marshland and engaged in clamming of large oysters that became a notable first export to Europe. The Gowanus Bay's 6-foot (1.8 m) tides pushed brackish water further into the creek, creating an environment where large bivalves thrived. In succeeding generations, negative artificial selection slowly reduced the size of the bivalves, since smaller bivalves were better adapted to the creek's water. Larger bivalves were less likely to survive, and thus, less likely to reproduce. In 1774 the Government of New York enacted a law to widen the creek into a canal, to keep the watercourse in good condition, and to levy taxes on people who used land near it.

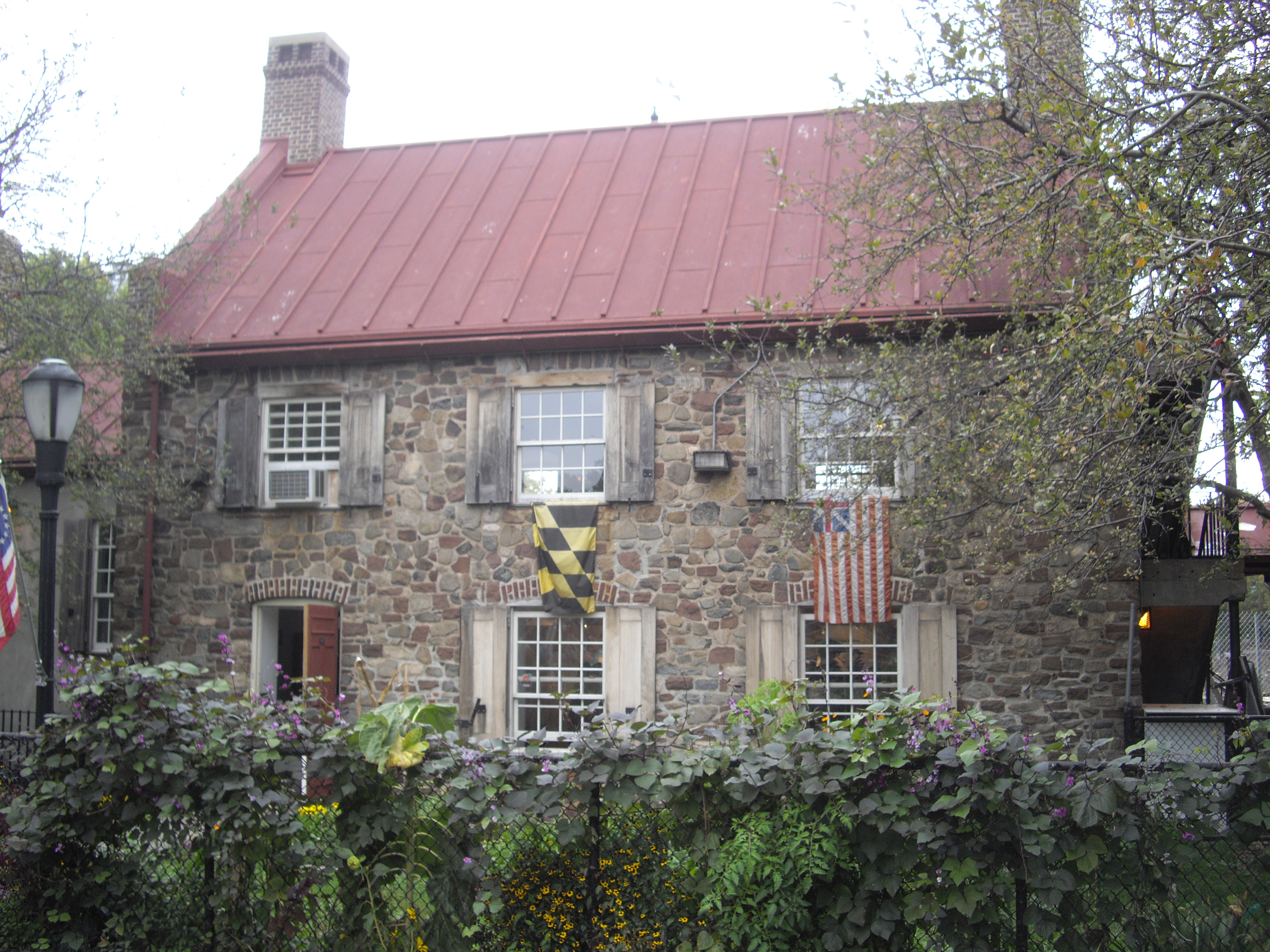
Old Stone House

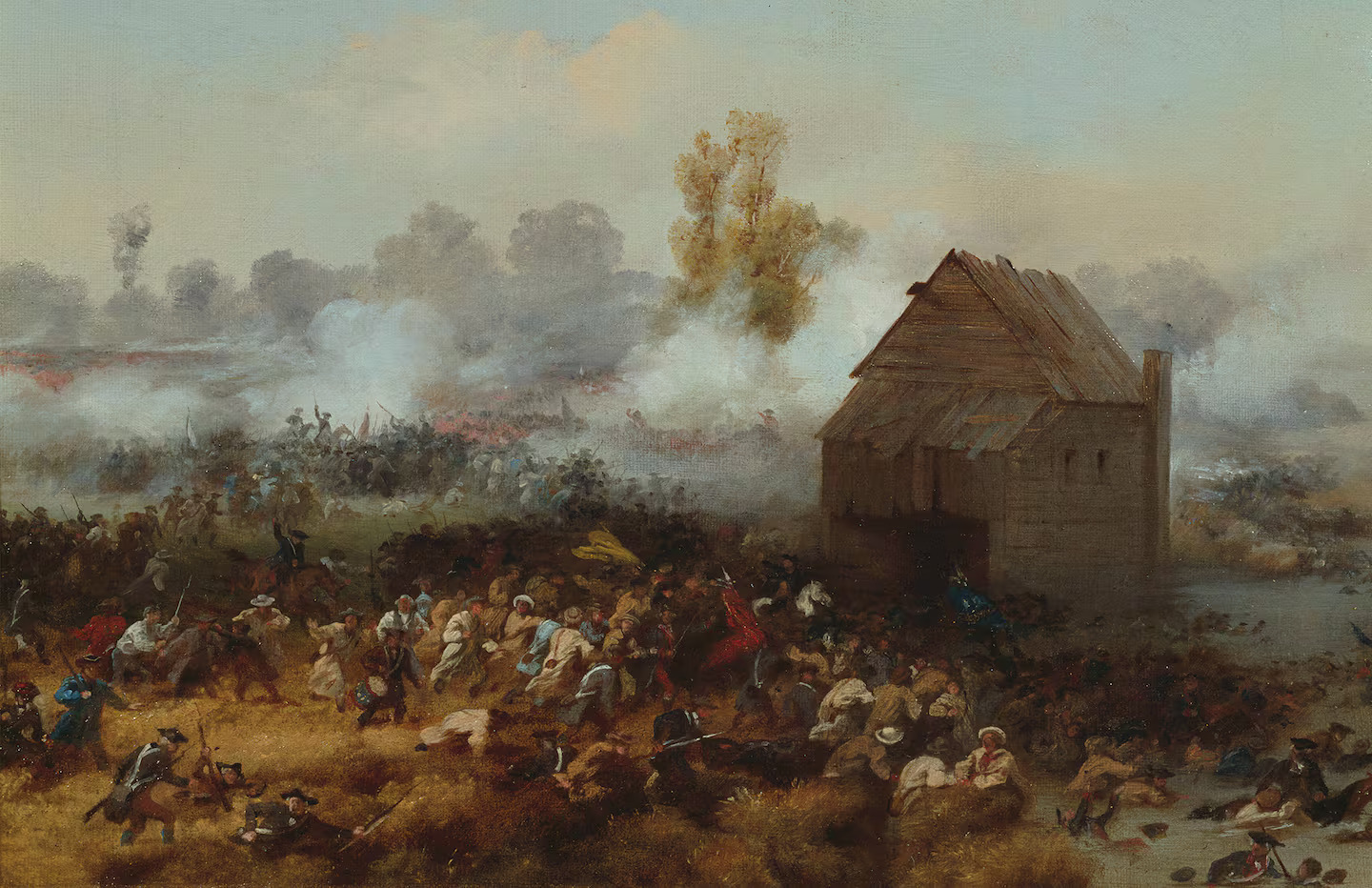
In Battle of Long Island (1858) by Alonzo Chappel, William Alexander, Lord Stirling leads the attack with 250 troops while others swim into the marsh.

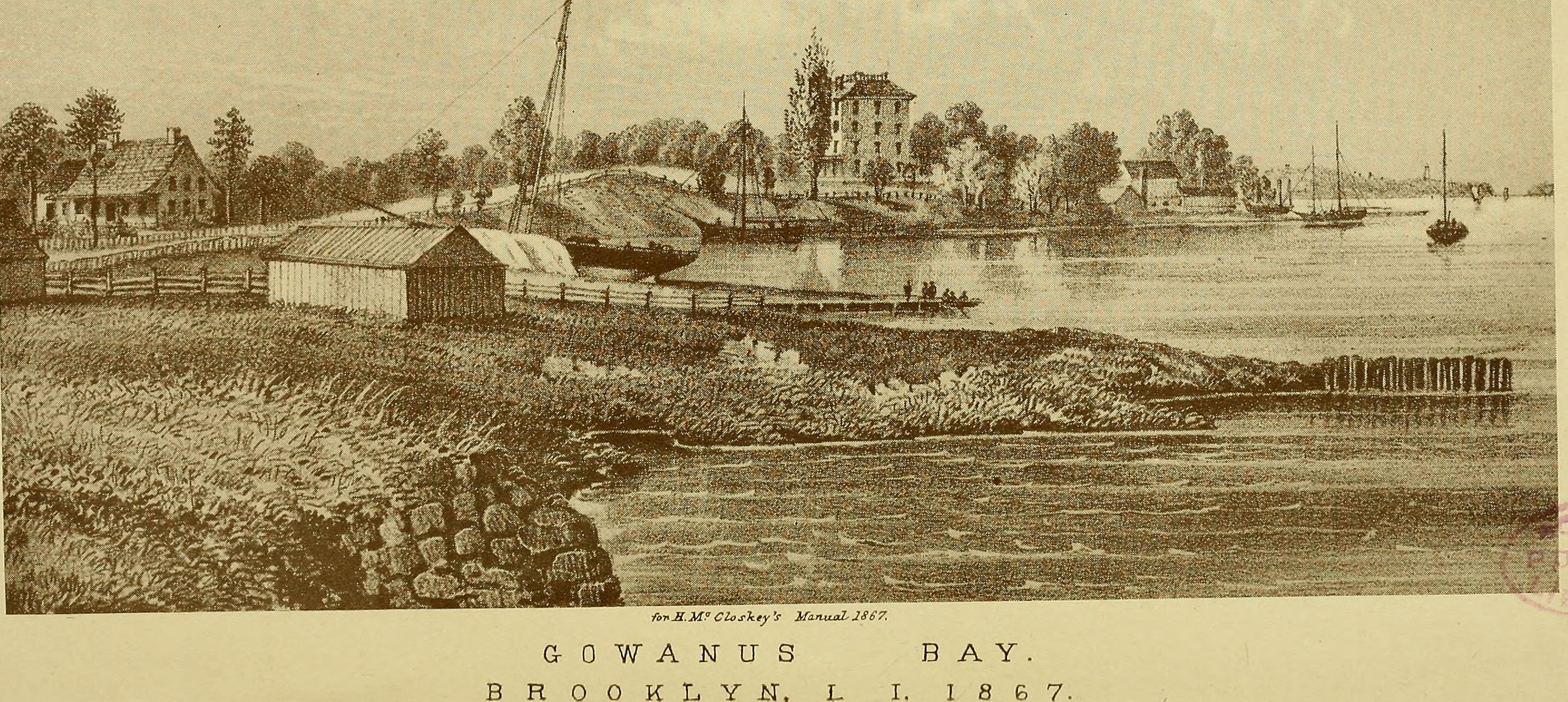
An 1867 print showing Gowanus Bay

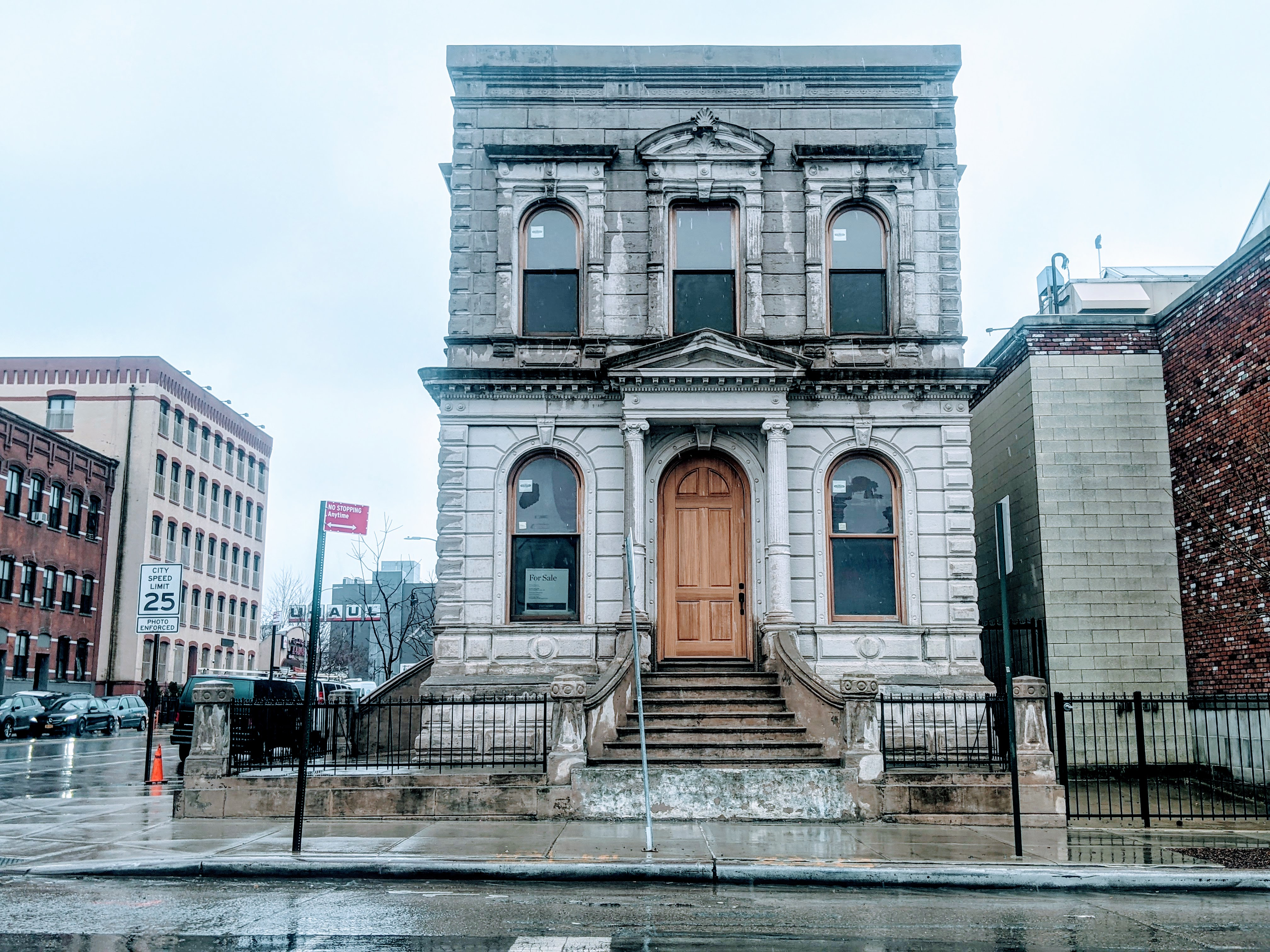
Third Street view of the Coignet Stone Company Building, later used by Edwin Litchfield's Brooklyn Improvement Company, which developed much of Park Slope and the Gowanus Canal basins

=== Industrial use ===
==== Transformation to city ====
By the mid-19th century, the City of Brooklyn was quickly growing and was the United States' third-largest city. The creek and surrounding agricultural land was now part of an urban agglomeration, consisting of villages along the creek's shores. That same shoreline of river and swamp functioned as both a transportation system and an informal sewage system for the growing city. The valley's watershed is approximately 6 square miles (16 km^{2}) and includes drainage from what are now the adjacent neighborhoods of Carroll Gardens and Park Slope. Wealthier residents tended to live inland and uphill to avoid the smells and "discomforts" of lower areas. Industries, which needed water for processing, transport, and disposal of wastes, gravitated toward sites along the shoreline.

The mills on the Gowanus were home to public landing sites, connecting the water route to the old Gowanus Road. As the local population grew, and the 19th-century industrial revolution reached Brooklyn, the need for larger navigational and docking facilities grew. Colonel Daniel Richards, a successful local merchant, advocated building a canal to benefit existing inland industries, and draining the surrounding marshes for land reclamation that would raise property values.

In 1849, under a decree by the New York Legislature, the Gowanus Creek was deepened so it could be used as a 1.5-mile (2.4 km) commercial waterway connected to Upper New York Bay. The creek's dredging was completed in 1860. Another act of the Legislature in 1867 allowed the canal to be deepened further. In the same decade, a developer named Edwin Litchfield undertook a project to straighten the creek into a canal.

At the time the 1.8-mile-long (2.9 km), 100-foot-wide (30 m) canal was built, several designs were proposed for it. Some included lock systems that would have allowed daily flushing of the whole waterway. However, these designs were considered too expensive. After exploring numerous alternative (and some more environmentally sound) designs, the final plan was chosen for its low cost. United States Army Corps of Engineers (USACE) Major David Bates Douglass was hired to design the canal, which was essentially complete by 1869. The cost of the construction came from assessments on the local residents of Brooklyn and State money.

==== Industrial heyday and massive pollution ====
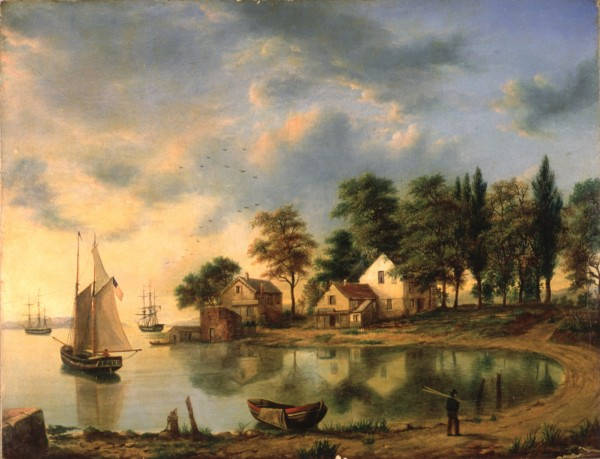
Sunset at Gowanus Bay in the Bay New York (1851) by Henry Gritten

Despite its relatively short length, the Gowanus Canal was a hub for Brooklyn's maritime and commercial shipping activity. At its busiest, as many as 100 ships a day transported cargo through it. In addition, the industrial sector around the canal grew substantially over time to include stone and coal yards; flour mills; cement works, and manufactured gas plants; tanneries, factories for paint, ink, and soap; machine shops; chemical plants; and sulfur producers. All of these industries emitted substantial water and airborne pollutants. Chemical fertilizers were manufactured along the canal soon after the Civil War.

Coal processing had been a dominant industry since 1869. By the late 19th century, there were 22 coal plants with frontage on the canal. Coal plants along the upper canal used large amounts of water in the conversion of coal to coke, liquids and gases. Coal gas was soon used for heating, light, and factory power. Coke was used to make steel. Wastewater and coal tar (now known to be a source of carcinogens) were dumped back into the canal. Brooklyn's slaughterhouses dumped blood and other wastes into the canals.

There was no through-flow of water and the canal was open at only one end, but the hope was that tides would be enough to flush the waterway. With the canal's wooden and concrete embankments, the strong tides of fresh diurnal doses of oxygenated water from New York Harbor were barred from flowing into the channel. With the high level of development in the Gowanus watershed area, excessive nitrates and pathogens are constantly flowing into the canal, further depleting the oxygen and creating breeding grounds for the pathogens responsible for the canal's odor. Water quality measures of the concentration of oxygen in the canal were just 1.5 ppm, well below the minimum 4 ppm needed to sustain life. The canal water took on a reddish-purple color, and a colloidal mixture described as "black mayonnaise" accumulated on its bottom.

In 1887, the New York State Legislature closed the Bond Street outflow point. By 1889, pollution in the Gowanus Canal had become so bad that the Legislature appointed a commission to study ways to ameliorate the canal's condition. It concluded that the canal would be best off if it were closed to commercial traffic and then covered-over. The commission also called the canal "a disgrace to Brooklyn" because of the foul smells arising from the waterway.

==== Attempts to lessen pollution ====
The first step to ameliorate the canal's pollution was the 1890s construction of the Bond Street sewer pipeline that carried sewage out into the harbor. This proved inadequate. In the first attempt to improve flow at the northern, closed end of the canal, the "Big Sewer" was constructed from Marcy Avenue in Prospect Heights to Green and 4th Avenues in Gowanus. It then entered the canal at an inflow point near Butler Street. Scientific American featured this sewer design for its innovative construction method and size. The area the sewer ran through was known as the "Flooded District". It was believed that this new sewer would serve two purposes: to drain the flooded district, and to use the flow of that excessive water to move the water of the upper Gowanus Canal. The tunnel was completed by 1893, but Brooklyn residents complained their sewage outputs were not connected to the Big Sewer. The Brooklyn Daily Eagle initially hailed the sewer's size and extent. However, the newspaper declared it an "engineering blunder" in 1898, saying the Big Sewer caused sewage to go back into the Gowanus Canal, rather than its intended purpose of draining sewage from it.

During the first decade of the 20th century, up to 700 structures were built in South Brooklyn every year. Thriving industry brought many new people to the area, but important questions about wastewater sanitation had not been properly addressed to handle such growth. All sewage from the new buildings drained downhill and into the Gowanus. Since there was less open ground than before, rainwater now went onto the roofs of the buildings and down into the canal. The building of new sewer connections only compounded the problem by discharging raw sewage from farther away neighborhoods into the canal. Pollutants, storm runoff, and discharge from the sewage system combined to make the canal's malodor so disgusting it was nicknamed "Lavender Lake". Compounding the problem, area property owners sued the city for damages related to the flooding issues that plagued the canal.

By 1910, complaints were being made about the canal's water being almost solid waste, which provoked the installation of a flushing tunnel that was 12 feet (3.7 m) across. The Butler Street Pumping Station, a Beaux-Arts structure at the canal's inland end, opened on June 21, 1911. The new flushing tunnel connected to the Pumping Station. At first, the brick-lined 1.2-mile (1.9 km) tunnel supplied clean water from the Buttermilk Channel between Brooklyn and Governors Island, carried it eastward underneath Butler Street, and discharged the clean water at the mouth of the Gowanus Canal. The flushing tunnel also failed, and aside from numerous operational glitches, a long series of errors and mistakes occurred throughout the 1960s. This culminated in an incident when a city worker dropped a manhole cover, severely damaging the pump system, which was already suffering from the effects of the corrosive salt water. The Clean Water Act of 1972 had not yet been passed, and the city, stretched for funds at the time, did nothing to address the issue. As a result of the unrepaired damage to the flushing tunnel, and the long stretch of economic recession, the waters of the canal lay stagnant and under-used for years.

==== Reputation as dumping ground ====
On December 4, 1875, the body of an unknown woman was found in the Gowanus Canal. On May 30, 1904, the body of an unknown man was found in the Gowanus Canal, The same year on December 20, the body of an unknown man was found in the Gowanus Canal and the body of a man who had been missing for three weeks was also found in the canal on December 19, 1908. Two bodies were found there May 7, 1909.

Several people have died after driving into the canal; examples include one man on January 2, 1919; Police Officer Daniel J. Grennan on December 9, 1920; two people on July 25, 1921; and two men on January 30, 1928.

There is an urban legend that the Gowanus Canal served as a dumping ground for the Mafia. Some cases are on record: news reports state that the bodies of a Brooklyn racketeer in the 1930s and a president of the Grain Handlers Union in the 1940s were found in the canal. In Lavender Lake, a 1998 documentary about the canal, two New York City police officers discussed how two fishermen had recently pulled from the canal a suitcase containing human body parts.

There have been reports of vessels lost in the canal. For instance, on January 2, 1889, the tugboat "Hugh Bond" sank in the canal during a gale, though the crew escaped. On May 10, 1892, the canal boat Alpha sank with a cargo of coal. On December 31, 1903, a dredge was found sunk in the canal, and an unnamed engineer/nightwatchman was reported missing and believed to be drowned. On August 13, 1918, a policeman found 28 sections of a submarine boxed in sections on the banks of the canal.

=== Economic decline ===
Oil storage tanks belonging to Bayside Fuel Oil and a scrap metal yard line the Gowanus Canal. Both docks are still in active use today.

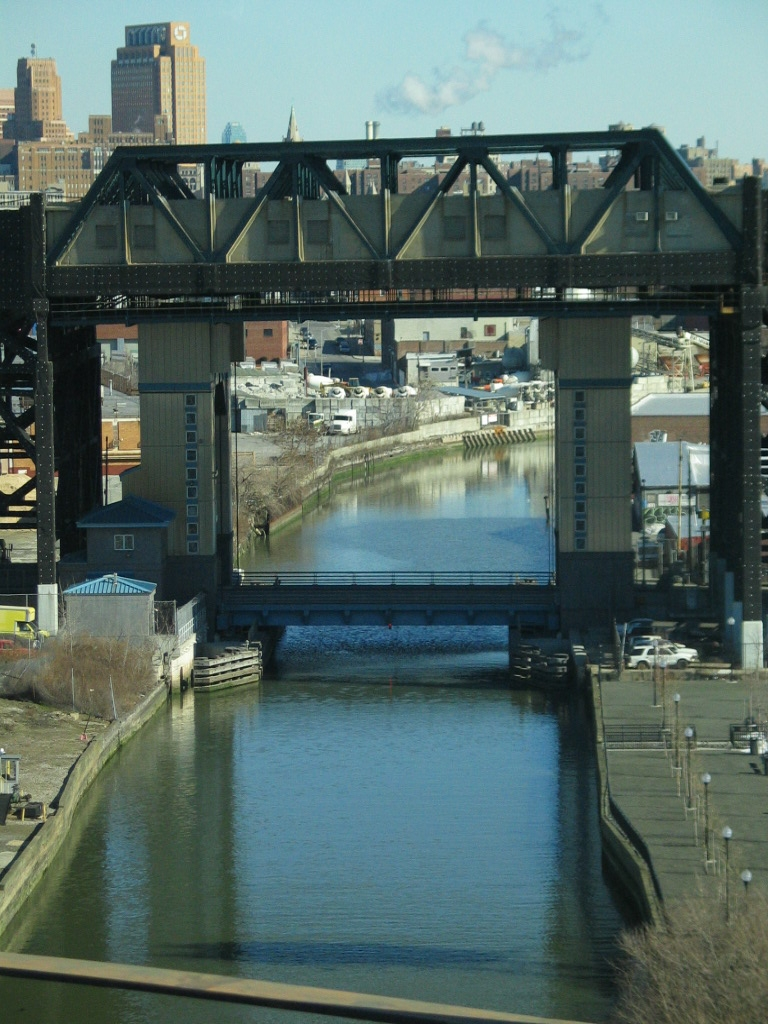
The bridge for the New York City Subway over the Gowanus Canal at Ninth Street

With six million tons of cargo hauled annually though the waterway after World War I, the Gowanus Canal became the nation's busiest commercial canal, and arguably the most polluted. The heavy sewage flow into the canal required regular dredging to keep the waters navigable. By the 1950s, Brooklyn's fuel trade was already converting from coal and artificial gas to petroleum, which was served by the wider and deeper Newtown Creek, and natural gas, which arrived by pipeline. In 1951, with the opening of the elevated Gowanus Expressway over the waterway, easy access for trucks and cars catalyzed industry slightly. The expressway carried 150,000 daily vehicles, which unloaded tons of toxic emissions into the air and water beneath. Around this time, sewage going to the Gowanus Canal was redirected into sewage treatment plants near the Buttermilk Channel.

With the early 1960s growth of containerization, the number of industrial waterfront jobs in the state declined. With much fanfare, the USACE completed its last dredging of the canal in 1955, and soon afterward abandoned its regular dredging schedule, deeming it to no longer be cost-effective. The intake fan that brought Buttermilk Channel water into the flushing tunnel broke in 1963, leading to its closure. A year later, the Verrazzano–Narrows Bridge opened, eliminating the need for industrial boats to use the canal at all, since trucks could use the bridge and Interstate 278 to ship goods from around the country to the Gowanus area.

With the failure of the city sewage and pump station infrastructure, the Gowanus Canal was used as a derelict dumping place. It remained in that condition for almost three decades. By 1993, a single company was actively using the Gowanus Canal as a shipping channel, and three of the drawbridges along the canal would only retract to let that company's boats pass. The few remaining barges mostly carried fuel oil, sand, gravel and scrap metal for export. The canal still serves as a port moving goods in and out of Brooklyn.

== Environmental cleanup ==
=== Early attempts at cleanup ===
External videos
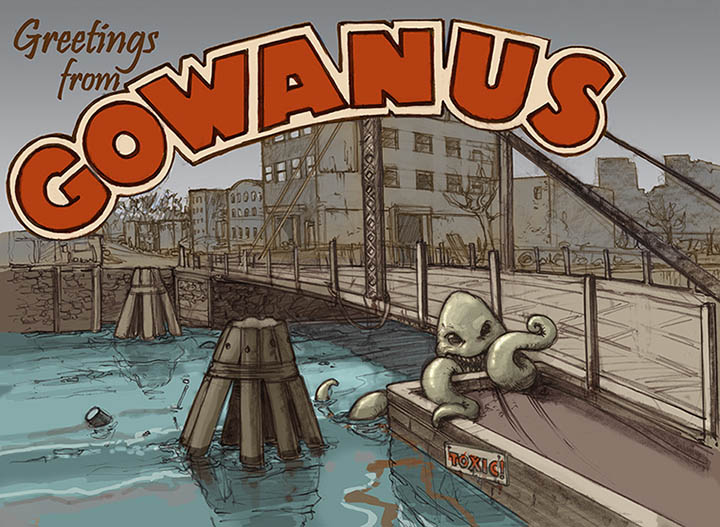
- "The case for Gowanus on the National Register of Historic Places", Marlene Donnelly, TEDxGowanus, on YouTube
- "Cleaning up a local superfund site", Natalie Loney, TEDxGowanus, on YouTube
- "CSI: Gowanus—Cleaning up the Canal", Science History Institute
- "LAVENDER LAKE: Brooklyn's Gowanus Canal", Allison Prete, on Vimeo

Repeated calls have been made to revitalize the economy and the environment of the Gowanus area. The first major U.S. law that would allow this, a law to address water pollution, was the Federal Water Pollution Control Act of 1948. It was followed by the establishment of the United States Environmental Protection Agency (EPA) in 1970 and the passage of the Clean Water Act in 1972.

Beginning in the 1960s, locals formed the Carroll Gardens Association (CGA) to lobby for civic improvements, including cleanup of the Gowanus Canal. Long-time restaurateur Nick Monte called it a "stinking, cancerous sore" and a "stinking cesspool". CGA founder Salvatore "Buddy" Scotto Jr. referred to the canal as "the most polluted waterway in the world", and "the spine of our deterioration", relating it directly to the economic problems of the area. In 1971, the City of New York held hearings on a Gowanus Industrial Urban Renewal Project, but did not support it with funding.

In 1974, Scotto brought microbiologists from the New York City Community College (now New York City College of Technology, or City Tech) to test the Gowanus Canal's water for bacteria. The organisms they found included several that caused typhoid, cholera, dysentery, and tuberculosis. The next year, funding was obtained for a preliminary assessment of the canal. Initial findings revealed an almost total absence of oxygen, much raw sewage, grease, oil, and sludge. In 1978, construction began on the Red Hook Sewage Treatment plant in Vinegar Hill that had been planned since the 1950s.

A full study of the canal was published in 1981. It indicated that on an average day, more than 13,000,000 US gallons (49,000,000 L) of raw sewage emptied into it. The report also documented the decreasing use of the canal by industry and shipping. The number of industrial firms using the canal fell from nearly fifty in 1942 to six in 1981. The amount of freight brought through the canal was more than 55% lower, and the number of times the drawbridges on the canal was opened declined by almost 70%. The report put forward a number of recommendations, one of which was fixing the flushing tunnel to increase the oxygen content of the water.

In 1987, the Red Hook Treatment Plant was opened, diverting more sewage input from the canal. This $375 million plant collected waste from the existing Bond Street sewer and brought the total of combined sewer overflow (CSO) points in the city to 14. With the opening of the new plant, the last dry-weather discharge into a New York City waterway ended, and the CSO points now only function during rain storms. The next year a sewage pipe was installed within the flushing tunnel, but according to a New York City Department of Environmental Protection (NYCDEP) engineer, the pipe was so poorly installed that it failed "almost immediately". The city unsuccessfully attempted to fix the flushing tunnel's sewage pipe in 1998. It was fixed in 1999 after engineers reversed the direction of the tunnel's fan. Previously, water from the canal had gone westward into the Buttermilk Channel, but now water from the channel went into the Gowanus Canal.

=== Superfund cleanup ===
==== Planning ====
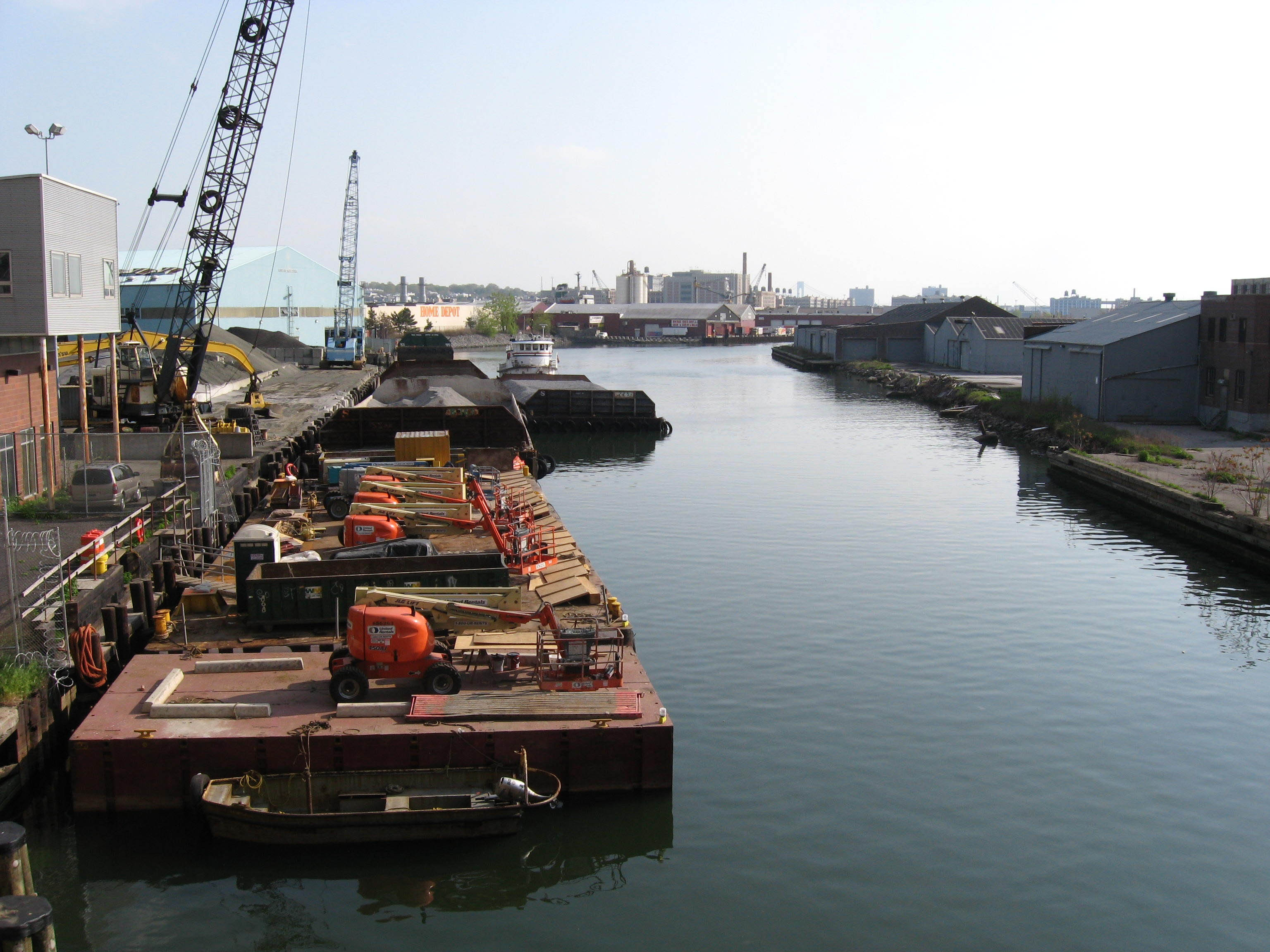
On the canal below Hamilton Avenue, barges bring crushed stone and store rental construction equipment.

In 2002, the US Army Corps of Engineers entered into a cost-sharing agreement with the DEP to collaborate on a $5 million Ecosystem Restoration Feasibility Study of the Gowanus Canal area. It was to examine possible alternatives for ecosystem restoration such as dredging, and wetland and habitat restoration and be completed in 2005. Discussions turned to breaking down the hard edges of the canal to restore some of the natural processes to improve the overall environment of the Gowanus wetlands area. The DEP also initiated the Gowanus Canal Use and Standards Attainment project to meet the city's obligations under the Clean Water Act.

In early 2006, the problem of wastewater management arose during a controversy over a planned arena for the Brooklyn Nets in nearby downtown Brooklyn. The project, at that point called Pacific Park, was to include a basketball arena and 17 skyscrapers. The resulting sewage would flow into antiquated combined sewers that can overflow when it rains. The Gowanus Canal has 14 combined sewer overflow points. The fear was the additional wastewater from the arena would lead to more frequent overflows in the canal.

In March 2009, the EPA proposed that the canal be listed as a Superfund cleanup site. The New York State Department of Environmental Conservation (NYSDEC) supported this action. It had requested help from the EPA to address the canal's environmental problems. In May 2009, the city stepped forward to oppose the Superfund listing. For the first time it offered to produce a Gowanus cleanup plan that would match the work of a Superfund cleanup, but with a promise to accomplish it faster. The city said it could now achieve a faster cleanup than the EPA. It would fund the cleanup through taxpayer dollars from the state and city levels, while the EPA would seek its funding from the polluters. The nonprofit Gowanus Canal Conservancy was also founded in 2009, creating partnerships with the EPA, the NYCDEP, groups such as Riverkeeper, and universities such as Cornell and Rutgers. On March 4, 2010, the EPA announced that it had placed the Gowanus Canal on its Superfund National Priorities List. Following this, the Corps of Engineers halted its study immediately, giving all its research to the EPA.

Initially, local residents resisted the EPA's proposed cleanup methods, as they feared that the toxic waste retrieved from the canal would instead be displaced onto nearby public areas. By 2013, the NYCDEP was planning to reduce the sewage content of the canal by repairing the freshwater tunnel that flushed the Gowanus. The repair was designed to mitigate, but not eliminate, the sewage problem. On September 27, 2013, the EPA approved a cleanup plan for the Gowanus Canal. The plan, which would cost $506 million was intended to be completed by 2022, and divided the canal into three segments split by 3rd Street and the Hamilton Avenue Bridge. The plan entailed three steps: dredging contaminated sediment from the bottom of the canal; capping the dredged areas; and implementing controls on combined sewer overflows to prevent future contamination. It also involved excavating and restoring approximately 475 feet (145 m) of the former 1st Street Basin and 25 feet (7.6 m) of the former 5th Street Basin. The restoration was expected to be paid for by the host of entities deemed "responsible parties" for the pollution by the EPA, including Brooklyn Gas and Electric, now part of National Grid and the City of New York.

The EPA suggested seven plans for the cleanup. In 2014, the EPA presented a proposal for containing toxic sludge in the Gowanus Canal. The Village Voice reported two scenarios as most viable. These were estimated to take ten years to complete and would cost around $350–$450 million. The first step in the plans was dredging, which was scheduled to begin in 2016. The second step was to lay down one of two different proposed "caps". The first "cap" proposal was for a concrete device, while the second was for a multi-layered device with pollutant-absorbent clay, a sand buffer, and an anchor composed of rocks. Ultimately, the multi-layered cap was selected for installation in the canal. However, there were concerns that the cleanup could pose a health risk.

==== Beginning of cleanup ====
In early 2017, EPA administrator Scott Pruitt, who had proposed many of the EPA budget changes and program eliminations, approved of the funding, saying that Superfund cleanups should be prioritized.

Work on the cleanup process began in October 2017, and at the time, the cleanup was expected to cost $506 million. The first phase of a pilot study at the canal's Fourth Street Turning Basin began in December 2016, but was delayed while bulkheads were being installed along the canal's banks. The pilot dredging uncovered several artifacts such as a crash boat from World War II; industrial wooden bobbins for textiles; and 19th-century wagon wheels. These artifacts had to be cleaned of contaminants before archaeologists could study them. In July 2018, during the pilot study, the promenade near Whole Foods was damaged due to contractor error. The cleanup itself was expected to start in 2020 and be completed two years later. The EPA issued a formal order on January 28, 2020, which initiated the first phase of the $506 million cleanup on the 1.8 mile long canal. This $125 million first phase would begin in September 2020 and last 30 months, though it wound up lasting 46 months ending in July 2024.

In the 2020s, the state government requested that 630 property owners test their properties for toxic substances such as trichloroethylene. Over a hundred buildings in the area were tested starting in 2023. On June 27, 2024, the EPA amended the 2020 order with a $369 million contract, beginning the second phase of cleanup, with no end date in sight. To encourage the city government to expedite the cleanup process, in August 2025, the New York State Department of Environmental Conservation proposed reclassifying the Gowanus Canal. At the time, the canal was a "Class SD" waterway (which required the city to make it clean enough to accommodate fishing), but the DEC proposed changing it to a "Class SC" waterway (which would force the city to make it safe enough for boating and swimming).

=== Cleanup components ===
==== EPA treatment ====
The Gowanus Canal, near Smith and 9th streets, with the Gowanus Expressway in the distance

The canal's toxic sediment layer averages 10 feet (3.0 m) thick, and at some spots reaches 20 feet (6.1 m). As part of the Superfund cleanup, the EPA would remove approximately 307,000 cubic yards (235,000 m^{3}) of highly contaminated sediment from the upper and middle segments and 281,000 cubic yards (215,000 m^{3}) of contaminated sediment from the lower segment. The sediment would be treated at an off-site facility.

Then, at the locations where contamination had permeated the underlying sediment, the EPA would cap the dredges with multiple layers of clean material. The multi-layer caps consist of an "active" layer made of a specific type of clay which would remove contamination potentially welling up from below. Atop the clay layer is laid an "isolation" layer of sand and gravel to ensure that the contaminants are not exposed. Next, an "armor" layer of heavier gravel and stone prevents boat traffic and canal currents from eroding the underlying layers. The topmost layer comprises sufficient clean sand atop the "armor" layer, filling the gaps in the layer of stones and establishing sufficient depth to restore the canal bottom as a habitat. In the middle and upper segments of the canal, where liquid coal tar has seeped into the natural sediment, the EPA would stabilize that sediment by mixing it with concrete or similar materials. The stabilized areas would then be covered with the multiple-layer caps.

Dredging in the canal in April 2022

As the Superfund model required the EPA to seek restitution from the Potentially Responsible Parties (PRPs), the estimated cost of the cleanup plan would be divided and distributed among more than 30 companies responsible for polluting the canal, as well as government entities like the New York City government and the United States Navy. Some of these companies, such as Brooklyn Union Gas, either no longer existed, had relocated, or had been renamed. If these defunct companies have been incorporated into another company, the property owners and the parent companies were expected to take responsibility, as are the companies that created or moved the pollutants around. The EPA Superfund Gowanus report identified two major PRPs: National Grid (which later acquired Brooklyn Union Gas' successor KeySpan) and the New York City government. National Grid filed a lawsuit in 2024, seeking to reduce the share it had to pay toward the cleanup.

==== Reactivation of the flushing tunnel ====
The Gowanus Canal Flushing Tunnel runs eastward from Buttermilk Channel and connects with the Gowanus Canal at Douglass Street, near the Canal's northern end.

According to the New York City Department of Environmental Protection, plans to reactivate the flushing tunnel pump were proposed in 1982. Various events caused the project to be delayed until 1994. The tunnel was finally reactivated in 1999. The new design employed a 600 horsepower (450 kW) motor, that pumped an average rate of 200,000,000 US gallons (760,000,000 L; 170,000,000 imp gal) a day of aerated water from the Buttermilk Channel in the Upper New York Bay into the head end of the canal. Although water was circulating through the tunnel, tidal forces meant it could only be pumped 11 hours a day. The water quality of samples taken while the flushing pump was operating was reported to have improved.

In 2010, New York City began a four-year project to upgrade and reactivate the flushing tunnel. According to The New York Times, the proposed plans included steps to "reconstruct the motor pit and replace the propeller with three modern vertical turbines; clean, patch and smooth the interior of the tunnel; replace the broken sewer pipe and encase it in concrete to improve water flow; and reduce the amount of sewer overflow into the canal by increasing capacity at a nearby pumping plant". Increasing oxygen content was a major goal of the project. The original plans were modified in 2012, after Hurricane Sandy, to protect critical equipment from flooding. In 2014, following completion of much of the work, the tunnel was reactivated at a cost of $177 million.

==== Stormwater management ====
Throughout its history, the Gowanus Canal's sewage problems have been exacerbated by the effects of stormwater. For years, heavy rains have flooded streets and caused sewage lines to overflow, contributing to the canal's contamination. Much of the Gowanus Canal area is at sea level, in a Zone A risk area for flooding. To help prevent flooding, the city is investing in various methods of stormwater management. One related improvement has been the creation of specialized curbside gardens, or bioswales, along sidewalks to absorb stormwater and reduce sewer overflows into the canal. A community-based non-profit organization, the Gowanus Canal Conservancy, is involved in stewardship of the bioswales. In 2015, the city built Sponge Park, along the canal's western bank at Second Street. The park doubles as a stormwater catchment area, absorbing pollutants before they can go into the canal.

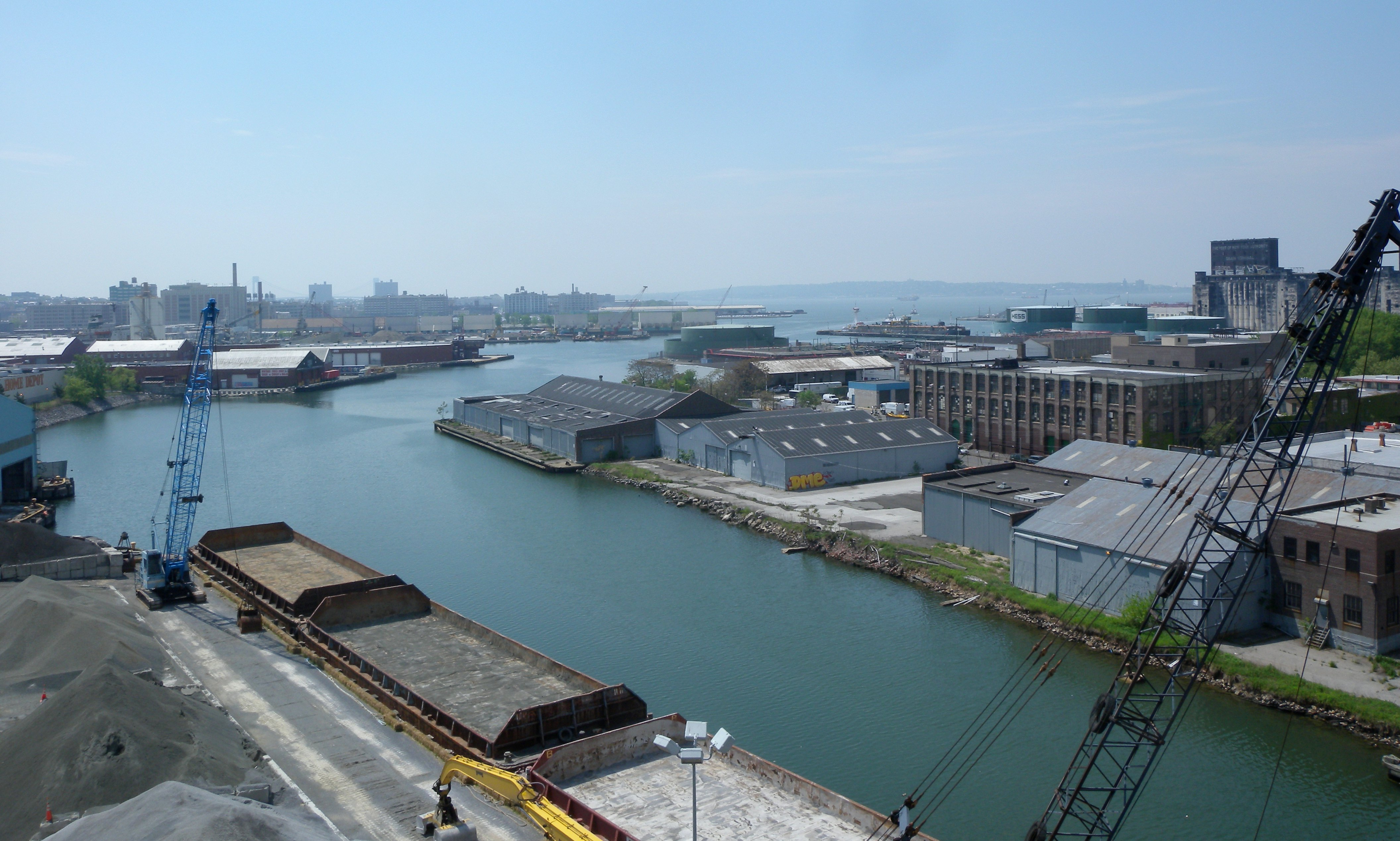
Mouth of the canal

Beginning in 2017, the city's Department of Environmental Protection built several miles of high-level storm sewers (HLSS) to prevent stormwater from flooding the city's sewage system. The new storm sewers carry stormwater collected in new and existing catchment areas, preventing it from entering the sewage system. The first phase, comprising sewer installations south of Douglass Street, was supposed to be completed by summer 2018; a second phase north of Douglass Street would proceed from 2018 to 2020. The HLSS, built on a 96-acre (39 ha) area east of the northern end of the canal, are planned to capture half of the stormwater within the Gowanus Canal's watershed.

Also in 2017, the New York City government published plans to construct two combined sewer overflow (CSO) treatment facilities along the canal to help with stormwater management. The first facility, the "Head End Site", is to be at the very north end of the canal on the eastern bank. The facility, located adjacent to an existing manufactured gas plant site, would handle sewage from the Red Hook Watershed, which comprises the land around the canal's western bank and north of the canal's head. The second facility, the "Owls Head Site", is to be at Second Avenue and Fifth Street, where the Fourth Street Basin splits off the rest of the canal. It would clean the water from the Owls Head watershed, which constitutes the land from the eastern bank to Prospect Park. These new facilities are required as part of an agreement between the city and the EPA. The Owls Head and Head End CSO facilities were designed by Selldorf Architects. The plan also includes a 1.6-acre (0.65 ha) park next to the Owls Head CSO facility, designed by dlandstudio and Sasaki.

By February 2019, the EPA and the city disagreed on whether untreated sewage should be stored in tanks or flushed out through a tunnel. The EPA wanted to divert the sewage to two newly built tanks along the canal, which would be less costly and be complete by 2027. However, the city has proposed diverting untreated sewage into a new tunnel, which would be more expensive and be finished in 2030. In 2021, the EPA ordered the city to construct sewage retention tanks before cleanup began. The EPA and the city agreed to the two-tank option, and the city began construction on the larger tank by September 2023 and the smaller tank by March 2024, with completion for both expected by 2029. The larger tank was completed in March 2025, six months earlier than scheduled.

== Redevelopment ==
=== Redevelopment plans ===
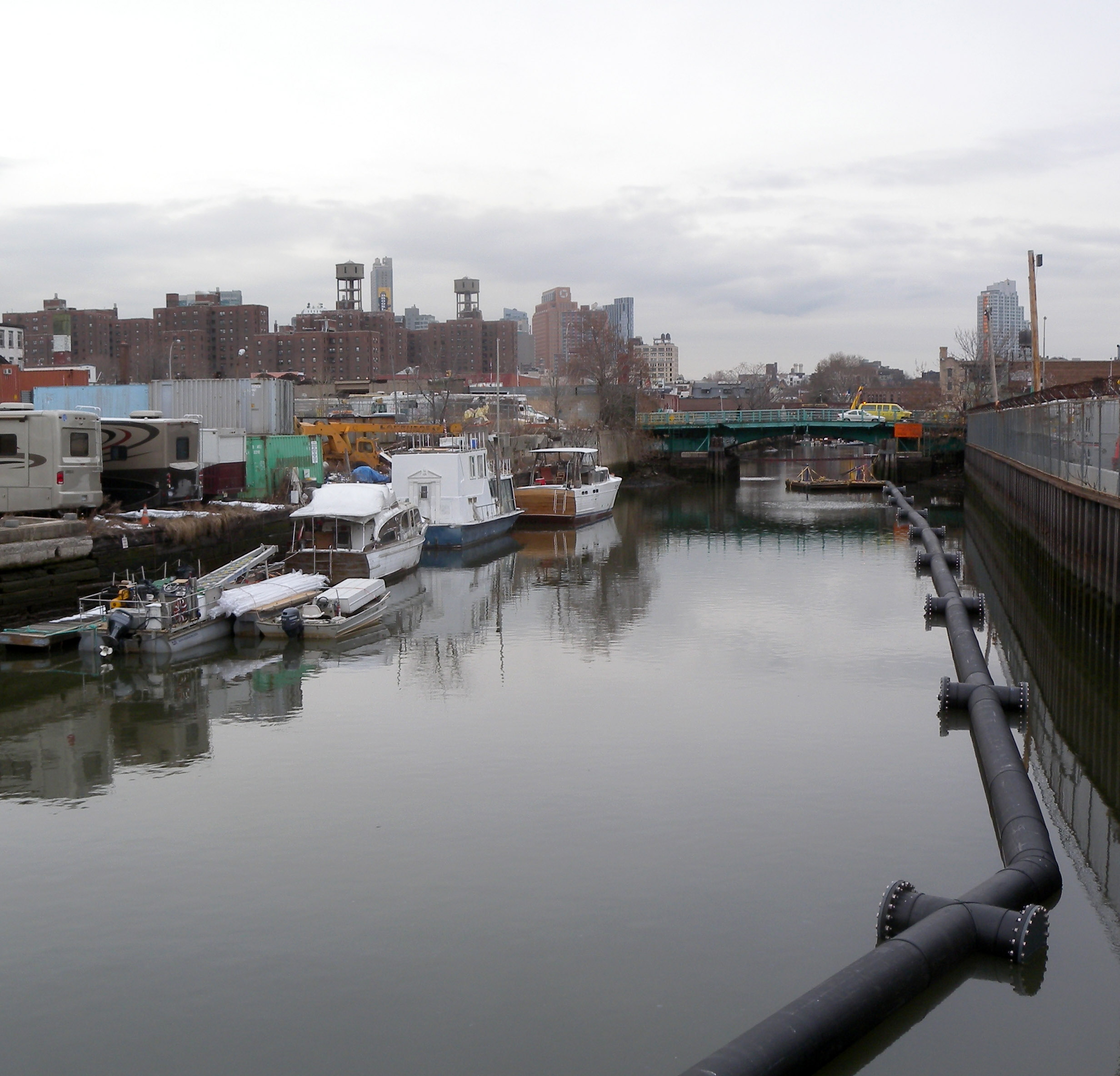
Boats on the canal

As early as 1980, the Gowanus area's low rents and proximity to more expensive cultural centers in New York had attracted artists and musicians. The sparsely occupied industrial area offered spaces for studios, music venues, bars, gyms and other businesses that benefited from low space-to-cost ratios. Nonetheless, the area's population declined to a historic low of 24,000 residents in 1990. The Carroll Street Bridge, an important Gowanus Canal crossing, closed for renovations in 1985. This caused major inconveniences for the surrounding communities, who had to walk several blocks to get to the other side of the canal. Businesses and schools closed as a result. The bridge reopened in 1989, its 100th anniversary.

In 1999, Assemblywoman Joan Millman allocated $100,000 to the Gowanus Canal Community Development Corporation (GCCDC) to produce and distribute a bulkhead study and public access document. The following year, GCCDC received $270,000 from the New York City Department of Parks and Recreation's Green Street program to construct three street-end public open spaces along the Gowanus Canal. Governor George E. Pataki funded an additional $270,000 to create a revitalization plan in 2001. $100,000 in capital funds were allocated in 2002 to implement a pilot project on the shoreline. In 2003, Congresswoman Nydia Velázquez allocated an additional $225,000 to create a comprehensive community development plan. The organization relies on community volunteers to maintain and clean these Green Street Projects.

The New York City government, local citizens' groups, developers, the EPA, and the USACE had a wide variety of concerns and differing visions for redevelopment in the area. The New York City government feared that designating the Gowanus Canal as a Superfund site would result in many potentially costly lawsuits against polluters. Meanwhile, the area directly to the east of the Gowanus neighborhood was rezoned for high density residential use with a strong commercial component in 2003. In 2009, plans to rezone Gowanus were also created. Many residents and community groups have expressed concern over the sewage overflow that the rezoning could possibly create.

=== Redevelopment sites ===
The United States Postal Service closed a USPS maintenance garage on the east side of the Ninth Street Bridge in the early 1990s. The 9.4-acre (3.8 ha) site became available for commercial development. In 1998, the site was proposed for the construction of Brooklyn Commons, a $63 million entertainment and retail complex featuring a 22-screen multiplex cinema, a bowling alley, shops, restaurants and a 1,500-space parking lot. The Swedish furniture store IKEA planned to open a store on the site, but withdrew its proposal in 2001 after opposition from the community. IKEA was later given permission to build a store in adjacent Red Hook. The 9th Street site remained empty until 2004 when a large Lowe's store was built and opened, along with an adjacent public promenade overlooking the canal.

By 1998, the neighborhoods around the canal (Carroll Gardens and Park Slope) were experiencing a resurgence of interest in the residential market. Perceptions of environmental risk related to pollution and possible flooding vied with the appeal of a diverse community accessible to more expensive areas of New York City. The area was given a new zoning designation, the "Gowanus Manufacturing Zone", as various groups try to determine the future of this complex urban space.

=== Effects of the cleanup on redevelopment ===
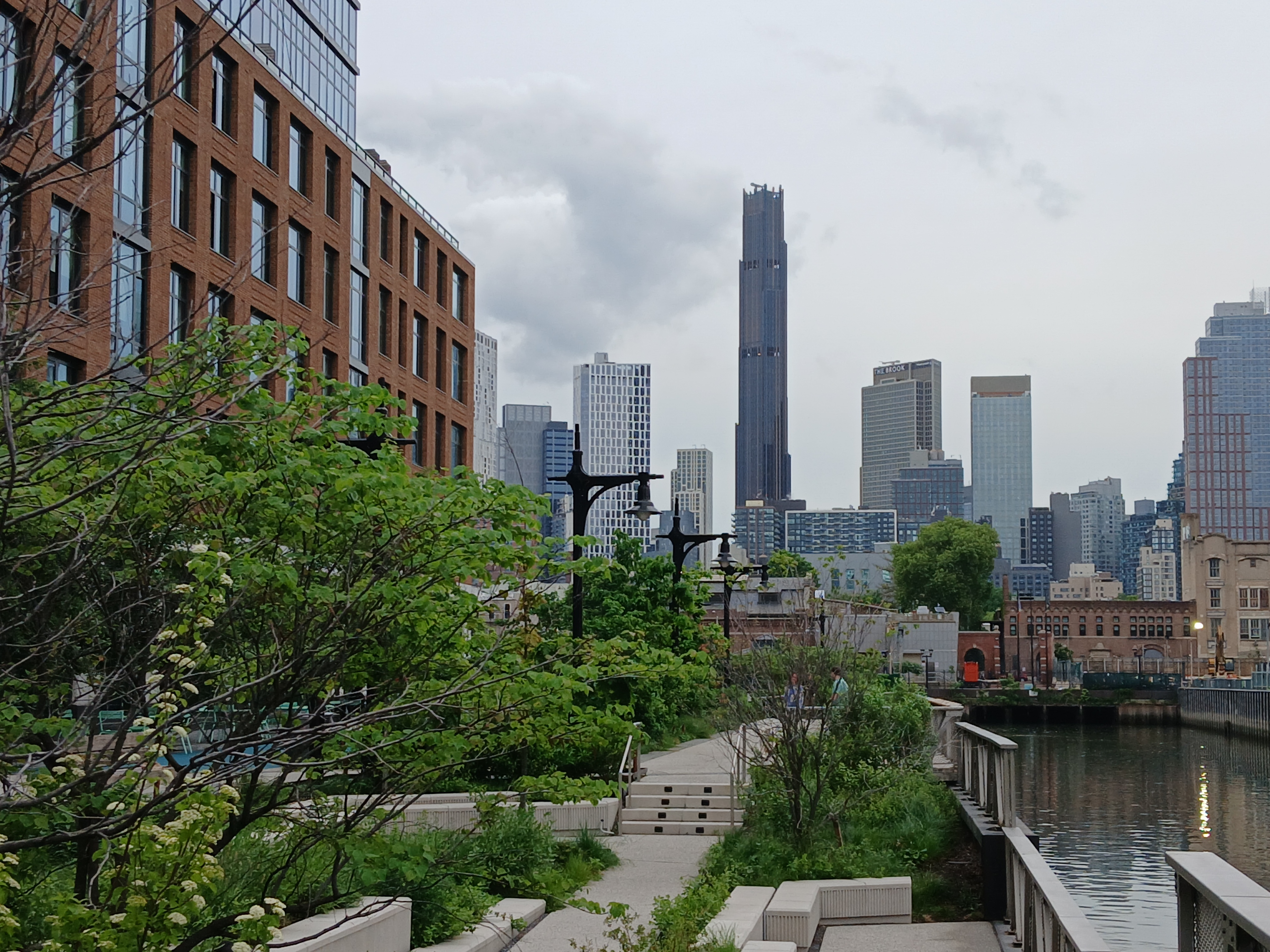
The west bank of the Gowanus Canal in 2026, facing Downtown Brooklyn. At left is a building constructed as part of the Gowanus redevelopment.

In February 2009, the City of New York granted a zoning change to the developer, Toll Brothers Inc. This allowed for a 480-unit, twelve-story super-block residential project, the first one permitted along the waterway. The city also set aside some land for a medium-sized development with 3,200 apartments. Twenty-five city blocks were allocated for 60 sites that were planned to produce a combined $500 million in tax revenues per year. Toll Brothers abandoned their project in 2010 after the Gowanus Canal was declared a Superfund cleanup site.

However, the cleanup itself led to a larger redevelopment movement in Gowanus. The first large-scale luxury development in the Gowanus area, 365 Bond, opened in June 2016 and was completely occupied by the following year. There were more than 56,000 applications for the 86 affordable apartments included in the development. In August 2016, the city restarted the rezoning process for the surrounding neighborhood. In June 2017, the Gowanus Canal Conservancy began the process of designing a redevelopment plan for the area. Landscape firm Scape was hired to create the Gowanus Canal redevelopment's master plan. Officials planned to reveal a more comprehensive plan in 2018, including rezoning a 43-block area and requiring developers to reserve 25% of the new units for affordable housing.

By late 2017, new development was concentrated around a rezoning area in the northern half of the canal. Although this area had gentrified rapidly, some residents opposed the new developments. The zoning plan for the area was projected to undergo changes through 2019, at which point the Superfund cleanup would be at its peak. Several developers bought, or were planning on buying, abandoned or little-used waterfront sites along the canal. An artist's community at Ninth Street was being turned into a mixed-use office building complex. In addition, the lyric-annotation website Genius.com had moved into a 15,000-square-foot (1,400 m^{2}) building along the northern portion of the canal. The area around the canal was rezoned in 2021, allowing more residential buildings to be developed there. The rezoning includes 8,500 new apartments in the area around the canal. As part of the rezoning, owners of new developments on the canal itself were obligated to construct their section of a promenade that would ultimately span 7 acres (2.8 ha). By the mid-2020s, numerous apartment buildings were being built nearby, and parts of the promenade had opened.

== Current usage ==
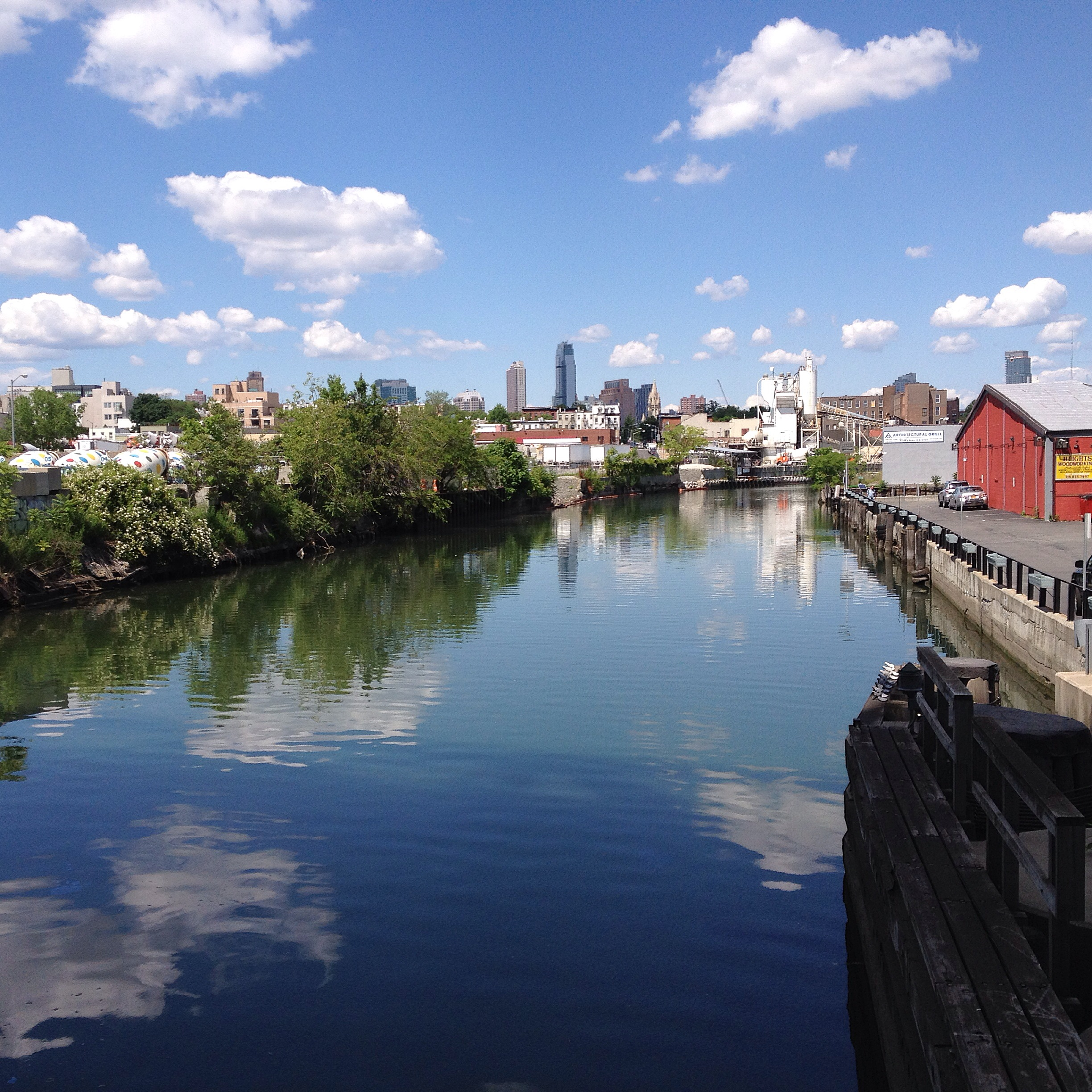
April 2014 view

Organizations dedicated to providing waterfront access and canal education include the Gowanus Dredgers Canoe Club (founded in 1999), and The Urban Divers Estuary Conservancy (founded in 1998). During the 2003 season, more than 1,000 people participated in Dredger Canoe Club programs, logging more than 2,000 trips along the canal. During the 2024 season, the club logged 1,144 trips on the Canal as access is restricted due to the ongoing Superfund cleanup.

The city government took a site at Smith and 4th Streets in 1975 and designated it a public place for use as "public recreation space". Despite the legal standing as a Public Place, developers have continually proposed developing the site for other uses. National Grid is accountable for cleanup of the pollution left on the site after years of coal gas manufacture. Upon completion of this cleanup, the site was to be turned over to the New York City Parks Department.

=== Activism ===
In November 2006, HABITATS, a festival dedicated to "local action as global wisdom", celebrated the Gowanus Canal with environmental conferences, collaborative art, educational programs and interactive walks around the area. The canal has also been the home to various arts organizations. Issue Project Room once organized art events in a converted silo along the bank of the canal. The Yard, an outdoor concert space, opened in the summer of 2007 near the Carroll Street Bridge, but shut down at the end of summer 2010.

On Earth Day in 2015, environmental activist Christopher Swain swam through the Gowanus Canal to promote awareness of the environmental restorative work. He wore protective swimwear however some of his skin was exposed to the biological and industrial waste. He applied preventative countermeasures such as antibacterial lotion and a hydrogen peroxide mouthwash. Swain, who had swum through heavily polluted waterways, described the Gowanus as being the dirtiest body of water that he had swum through, composing of "mud, poo, detergent, oil and gasoline" and "swimming through a dirty diaper".

== Water quality ==
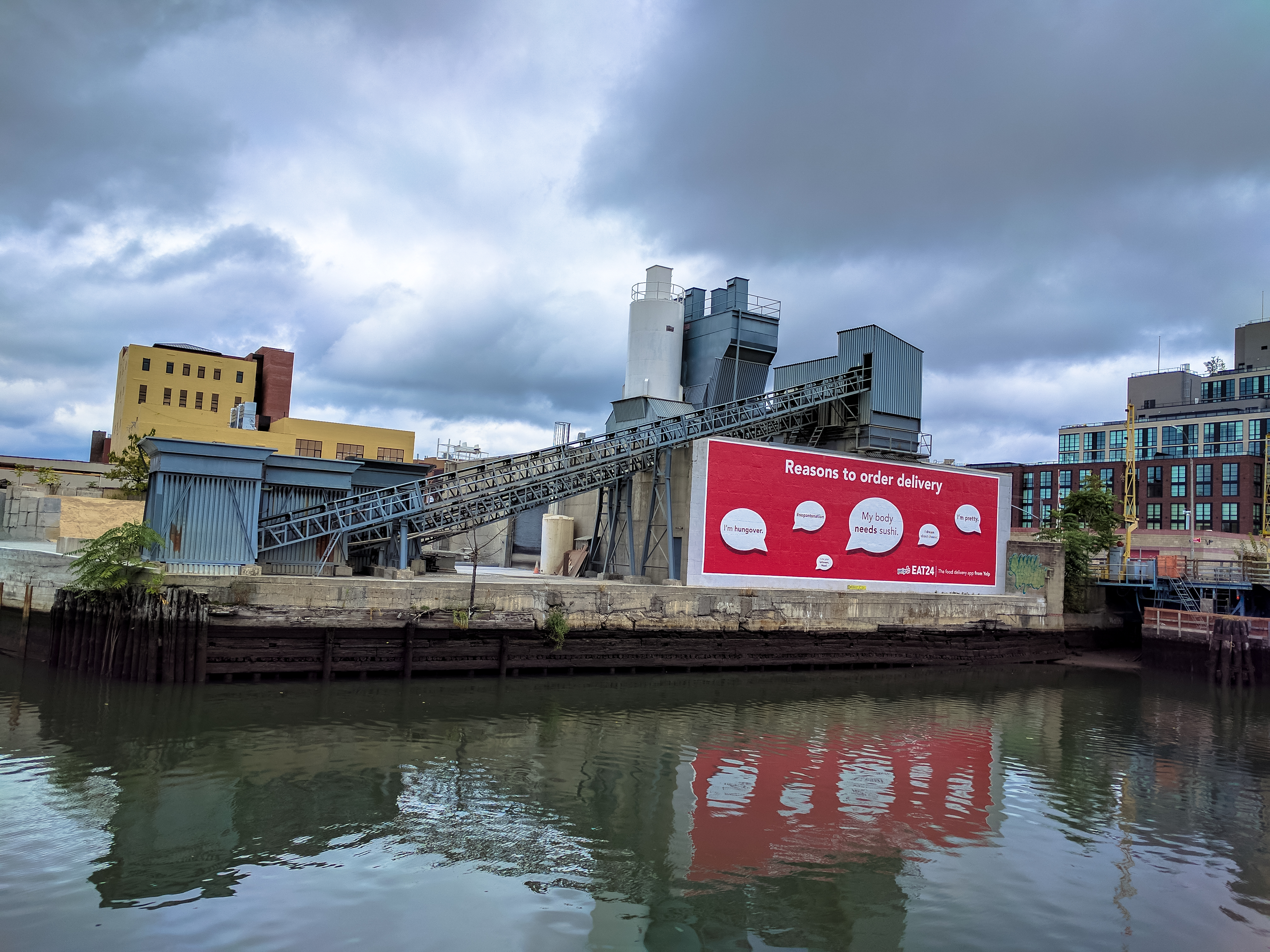
A salt lot along the canal

Different parts of the Gowanus Canal are effectively microclimates, which may have very different conditions and types of contamination. Overall, the water is considered unsafe to drink or swim in, and contact with the canal's water is discouraged. The Gowanus Dredgers Canoe Club encourages people to canoe on the canal, in part as an incentive to revitalize the area. The Urban Divers Estuary Conservancy allows careful diving using full-encapsulation suits, followed by rigorous decontamination procedures. Fish caught in the canal are generally toxic and unsafe to eat in large quantities. As of 2018, birds have begun returning to the canal, which some hope suggests the water quality is improving enough to support wildlife.

=== Anecdotal descriptions ===
Anecdotal reports of the canal's water quality include descriptions of a reddish-purplish color due to coal and slaughterhouse wastes in the 19th century, and a lighter purplish color, leading to its nickname "Lavender Lake" in the 20th century. Twentieth-century author H. P. Lovecraft described "the lapping oily waves at its grimy piers". In 1999, the water's usual color was described as "green with a white undertone, akin to the look of cream-infused coffee". A 2013 account describes the canal's "modern" color as being gray-green. In 2017, two long-time residents recalled the canal's black color in the 1950s: "All you could see was a big cesspool, and bubbles coming up."

The surface of the Gowanus Canal's water has frequently been reported to have an iridescent sheen suggestive of oil, polychlorinated biphenyls (PCBs), coal tar, and other industrial wastes. As recently as December 2009 a Gowanus Canal Investigation Executive Summary Report noted the presence of "spotty, iridescent, and platy sheens of varying intensity", fecal matter, emulsified oil, and blebs of non-aqueous phase liquid in various areas of the canal. Photographers have also captured artistic images of the canal.

The opaqueness of the canal's water obstructs sunlight to one-third of the 6-foot (1.8 m) depth needed for the bottom-level growth of aquatic plants. Rising gas bubbles betray the decomposition of sewage sludge that on a warm, sultry day produces the Gowanus Canal's notable ripe stench. One reporter in 1999 described the smell as "like sticking your head into a rubber boot filled with used motor oil and rotten eggs", while another in 1998 said that it was "less a scent than an assault that reaches in to choke the throat. Sometimes it has the biting odor of petroleum, with more than a hint of dead fish." There are reports that the smell has lessened in recent years as oxygen levels in the water have increased.

The murky depths of the canal conceal the legacy of its industrial past: cement, oil, mercury, lead, multiple volatile organic compounds, PCBs, coal tar, and other contaminants. A sludgy bottom layer, dubbed black mayonnaise, was described to have existed beginning in the 19th century, and is still present—in some places up to 20 feet (6.1 m) deep.

=== Scientific measurements ===
Beginning in the 1970s, a variety of governmental, academic, and citizens' groups have taken intermittent measurements of the canal's water quality. There has been no coherent, long-term program for tracking water quality because no funds exist for such a program.

The canal hosts high levels of pathogens, many of which are harmful to humans. The 1974 report by New York City Community College microbiologists found that the water contained typhoid, cholera, dysentery, and tuberculosis. Additionally, a 2003 report of the New York Harbor showed that the Gowanus Canal had the highest level of pathogens of any location in the entire harbor. Microbiologist Nasreen Haque and her classes from the City University of New York have also tested water from the Gowanus. In 2007–2008, Haque's classes reported finding "every kind of imaginable pathogen", including those that cause gonorrhea. However, in 2010, students from City Tech found lower levels of Escherichia coli than they had expected.

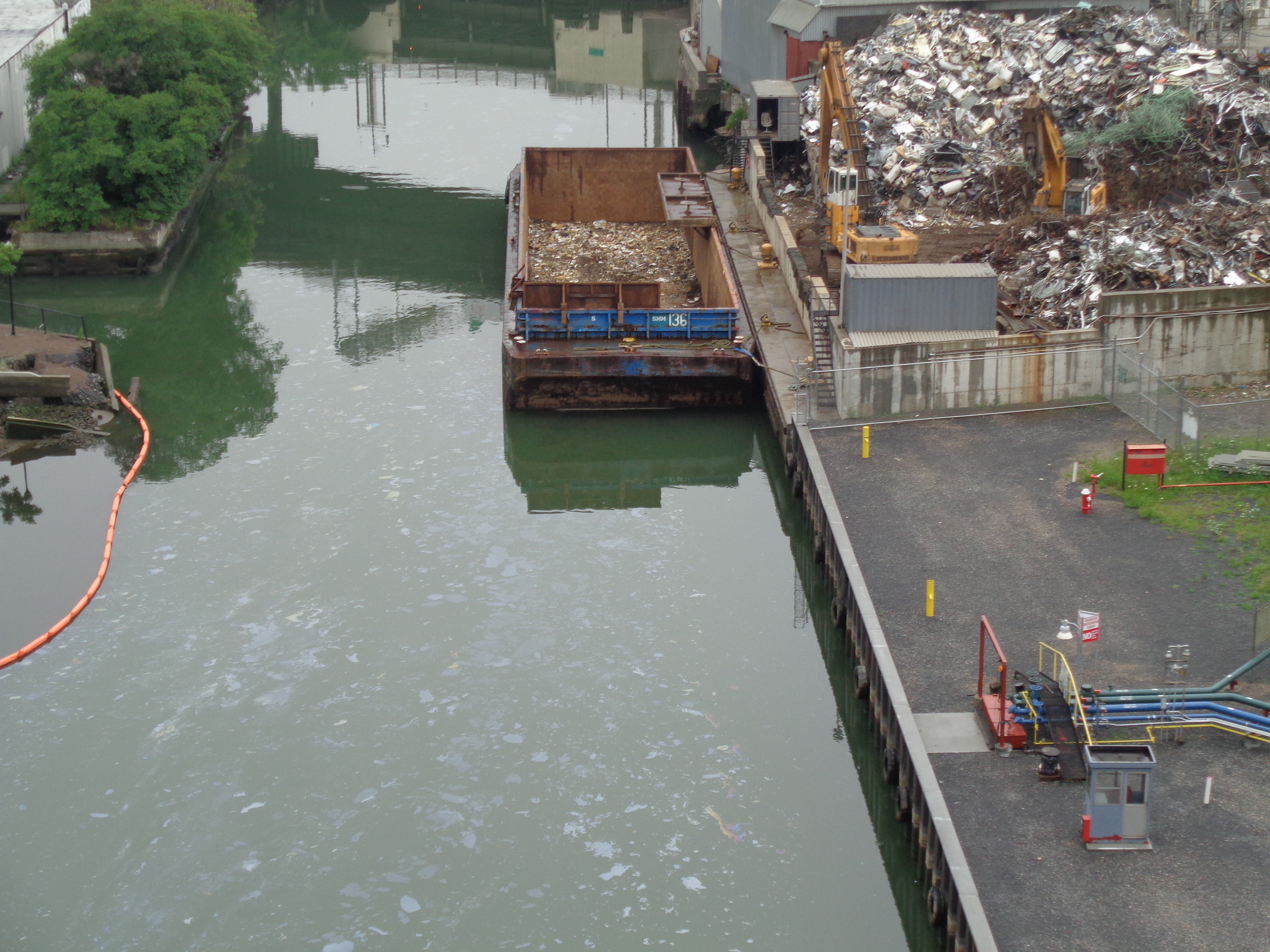
The Gowanus Canal abutting the Benson Scrap Metal scrapyard

Fecal matter is also prevalent in the canal. In 2009, a local environmental "neighborhood watch" called Riverkeeper tested canal water immediately following heavy rains and sewage flooding. It reported Enterococcus at levels of 17,329 cells per 100 milliliters, with anything above 104 cells per 100 milliliters being considered unsafe; Enterococcus is considered an indicator of other possible pathogens. As of 2013, fecal matter was still present in Gowanus' water at levels of parts per hundred. A more usual measurement for a waterway would be parts per million.

Low levels of dissolved oxygen in the canal's waters predate World War I. The minimum level of oxygen required to support healthy marine life is estimated at 4 parts per million. As early as 1909, it was reported that the canal had no oxygen at all. In 1975 a severe lack of oxygen was still observed, indicating the water was incapable of sustaining plant life or fish. In 1999, just before the flushing tunnel was reactivated, The Environmental Magazine reported that oxygen levels in the Gowanus Canal measured about 1.5 parts per million; this number continued to be quoted fourteen years later. However, by 2008, nine years after the flushing tunnel was reopened to provide oxygenation of the water, biologist Kathleen Nolan and students from St. Francis College sampled the water and reported that levels of dissolved oxygen had substantially increased. In 2014, a NYSDEC representative stated that dissolved oxygen levels were reported to be in the range of 9 to 12 mg/L (3.3×10^{−7} to 4.3×10^{−7} lb/cu in), or approximately 9–12 parts per million.

With respect to the underlying layers of residue in the canal, the EPA and other organizations have performed detailed analyses of the composition and distribution of black mayonnaise throughout it. The 2012 Superfund Proposed Plan also includes detailed assessments of risk related to the types of pollutants in the layers of sediment, the water, and the surrounding area.

The Gowanus Canal's pollution has also spread to Gowanus Creek, at the mouth of the canal. In 1982, USACE released the results of a report on navigation in the creek. It found that there were nonexistent levels of oxygen; high concentrations of fecal coliforms; and significant clusters of oil and grease.

=== Wildlife ===
Originally, the marshland and freshwater springs that drained into the Atlantic Ocean in Upper New York Bay were capable of supporting massive oyster beds. As late as 1911, people reported fishing in the Gowanus Canal and treading for clams. By 1927, the last of New York's oyster beds had closed as a result of habitat destruction, over-harvesting, and pollution.

Attempts have been made to reintroduce oysters and other shellfish to the canal, because they can filter out toxins and help clean the water. One oyster can process as much as 50 US gallons (190 L) of water a day. The NY/NJ Baykeeper environmental group gives oysters to volunteers who then monitor their health and growth in local waterways. They have helped Katie Mosher-Smith and The Gowanus Community Oyster Garden's Stewards to partner with teachers, students and the Gowanus Dredgers Canoe Club to install and monitor oyster cages in the canal. In 2012, landscape architect Kate Orff proposed a design for a park with a living reef containing oysters, mussels, and eelgrass. As part of a pilot program, ropes were hung off of a pier to attract ribbed mussels.

Restoration of the flushing tunnel, and the resulting increase in oxygen levels in the canal, have supported the return of some aquatic life. Within months of the reopening of the flushing tunnel in 1999, John C. Muir of the Brooklyn Center for the Urban Environment observed pink jellyfish, blue crabs, and a variety of fish. By 2009, white perch, herring, striped bass, and anchovies were living in the waterway. In 2014, the Gowanus Canal Conservancy reported that herons, egrets, bats, and Canada geese were living nearby. However, individuals and populations of wild animals living in the Gowanus Canal may be at risk for reproductive problems. Creatures living in the canal generally have a below-average life expectancy compared to members of the same species living elsewhere in New York Harbor.

Approximately 15 edible species of fish and shellfish can be found in the canal, but they are toxic. The shellfish contain toxins and are unsafe to eat, according to a 2012 report. However, signs posted in 2018 note that men over age 15 and women over age 50 can safely eat up to six blue crabs from the Gowanus Canal each week, although women under 50 and children under 15 should not eat the canal's blue crabs at all.

Aquatic mammals have been observed in the canal only rarely and in cases of severe distress. A harp seal was observed in the canal in 2003, its flippers bloodied, but it survived and was relocated to the Long Island Sound. In 2007, a young minke whale ended up in the canal as a result of heavy storms. The whale, soon nicknamed "Sludgy", was unable to get out and soon died. A necropsy of Sludgy, performed by animal anatomist Joy Reidenberg, indicated that the whale had already been sick. On January 26, 2013, a dolphin entered the canal at low tide, was unable to get out, and died. A necropsy showed that it was middle-aged and sickly before becoming trapped. It had kidney stones, gastric ulcers, and parasites.

=== New forms of life ===
Although the Gowanus Canal is poisonous to humans, it may be breeding previously unidentified types of organisms. In 2008, Nasreen and Nilofaur Haque reported the presence of white clouds of "biofilm" floating above the sludge on the bottom of the canal. Examinations suggested that the colloquially named "white stuff" is a co-operative mix of bacteria, protozoa, chemicals, and other substances. The parts of the mixture acted together to find food, and the biological components exchanged genes and excreted material that acts as an antibiotic to protect it from toxins in the water. The Haques started studying methicillin-resistant Staphylococcus aureus from the canal to learn more about what makes bacteria resistant, so that the research might help to develop new antibiotic drugs.

In 2014, volunteers and scientists donned Hazmat suits to sample the black mayonnaise from the canal, extracting DNA which was sequenced at the Weill-Cornell Medical College. Ellen Jorgensen, executive director of the startup Genspace, reported that the group failed to identify half of the DNA. They found "42 kinds of bacteria, two viruses, and five life forms from the domain Archaea", many uniquely adapted to the extreme environment of the Gowanus Canal. Methylococcaceae, a family of microbes found in the Fourth Street Basin, consume methane. Desulfobacterales take in sulfate and release hydrogen sulfide, contributing to the Gowanus' characteristic rotten egg smell. Bioengineers and others involved in the 2014 study were also interested in studying the Gowanus Canal's unique microbial communities. These naturally-evolving bioremediating bacteria consume the Gowanus' pollutants. Understanding how they co-exist with and degrade toxic compounds might suggest new methods for bioremediation.

In December 2014 and April 2015, researchers based at New York University sampled sediment from 14 sites along the canal. The Department of Environmental Protection obtained a core sample in September 2015, finding 455 species of microbes and 1,171 genes consistent with exposure to heavy metal compounds. Their sample included eight types of antimicrobial resistance markers, 2,319 biosynthetic gene clusters, and secondary metabolites.

== In popular culture ==
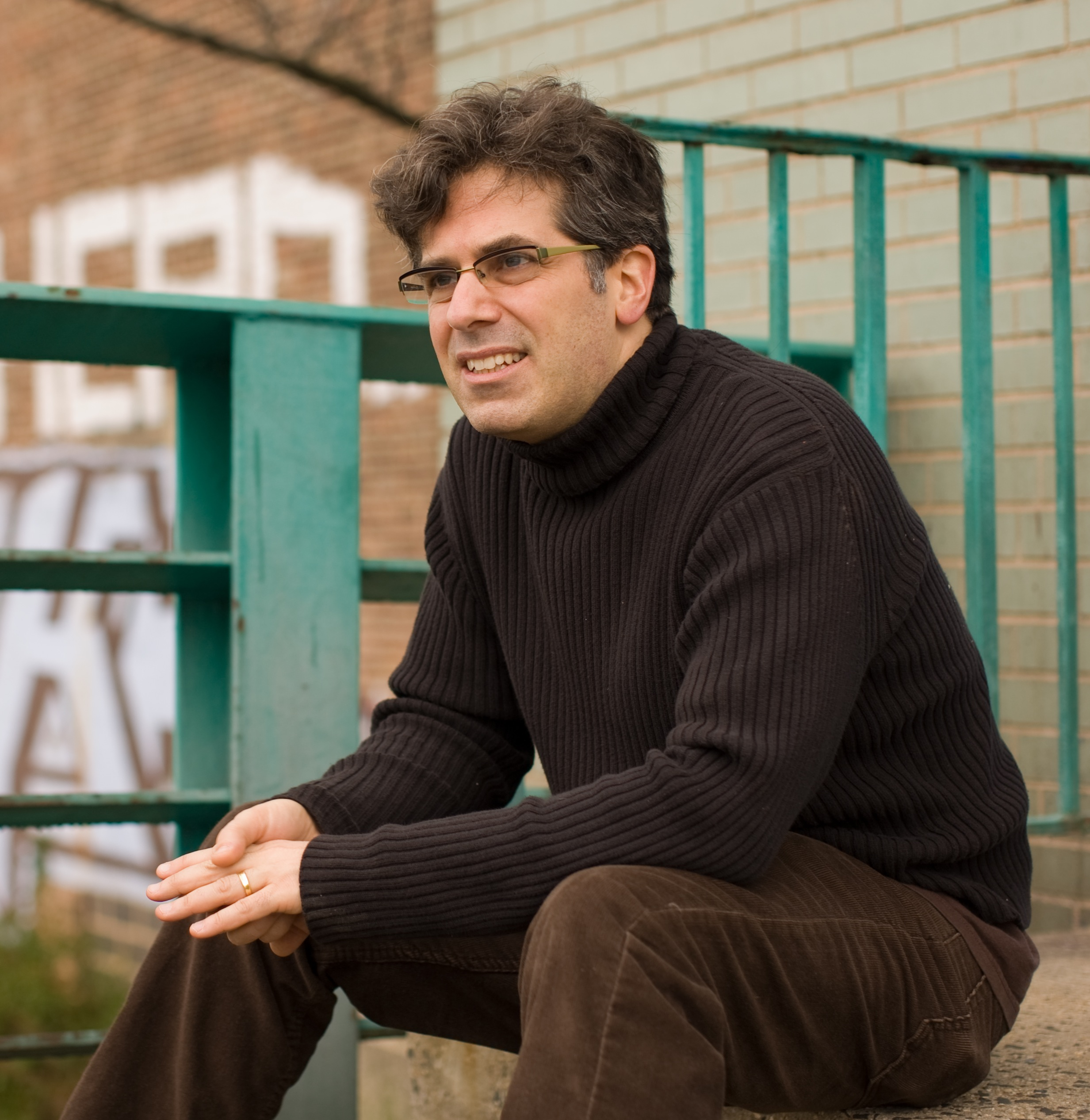
Jonathan Lethem (pictured sitting on the bank of the Gowanus Canal) referred to the canal in his book Motherless Brooklyn.

Thomas Wolfe described the "huge symphonic stink" of the canal which was "cunningly compacted of unnumbered separate putrefactions" in his 1940 novel You Can't Go Home Again. The 1985 film Heaven Help Us used Carroll Street Bridge as a filming location. In Jonathan Lethem's Motherless Brooklyn (1999), a character refers to the canal as "the only body of water in the world that is 90 percent guns". In Joseph O'Neill's novel Netherland (2008), the remains of one of the protagonists are found in the Gowanus Canal. In an episode of the TV show Bored to Death, called "The Gowanus Canal Has Gonorrhea!", two antagonists threaten the show's hero with a swim in the canal.

In 2014, So What? Press published an issue of its comic series Tales of the Night Watchman, entitled "It Came from the Gowanus Canal", about a toxic sludge monster who lives in the canal and takes revenge on a gangster who once dumped bodies there. It was written by Dave Kelly and illustrated by Lee Knox Ostertag. The publisher also produced a fake movie poster in conjunction with the Gowanus Souvenir Shop based on the issue in 2015. In 2017, a sequel to the comic was produced with the title "It Came from the Gowanus Canal...Again!" It was written by Dave Kelly, drawn by Brett Hobson, colored by Clare DeZutti, with a cover by Tim Hamilton. In the sequel, the monster returns and takes revenge on criminals who are responsible for the death of a young boy, but the Night Watchman must protect one of the killers to stop the monster.

In November 2015, Gothamist posted a video that featured a fisherman saying that he had just caught a three-eyed catfish in the canal. Although the story was later posted by a number of news outlets, experts expressed skepticism about the fish story. A New York Times article indicated that the three-eyed catfish was a hoax perpetrated by the performance artist Zardulu.

== See also ==
- List of Superfund sites in New York
- The Gowanus Memorial Artyard
- Geography of New York-New Jersey Harbor Estuary
- Bob Zuckerman, activist who has advocated for cleaning the canal
