= Union Street Bridge =

Bridge in Brooklyn, New York, U.S.

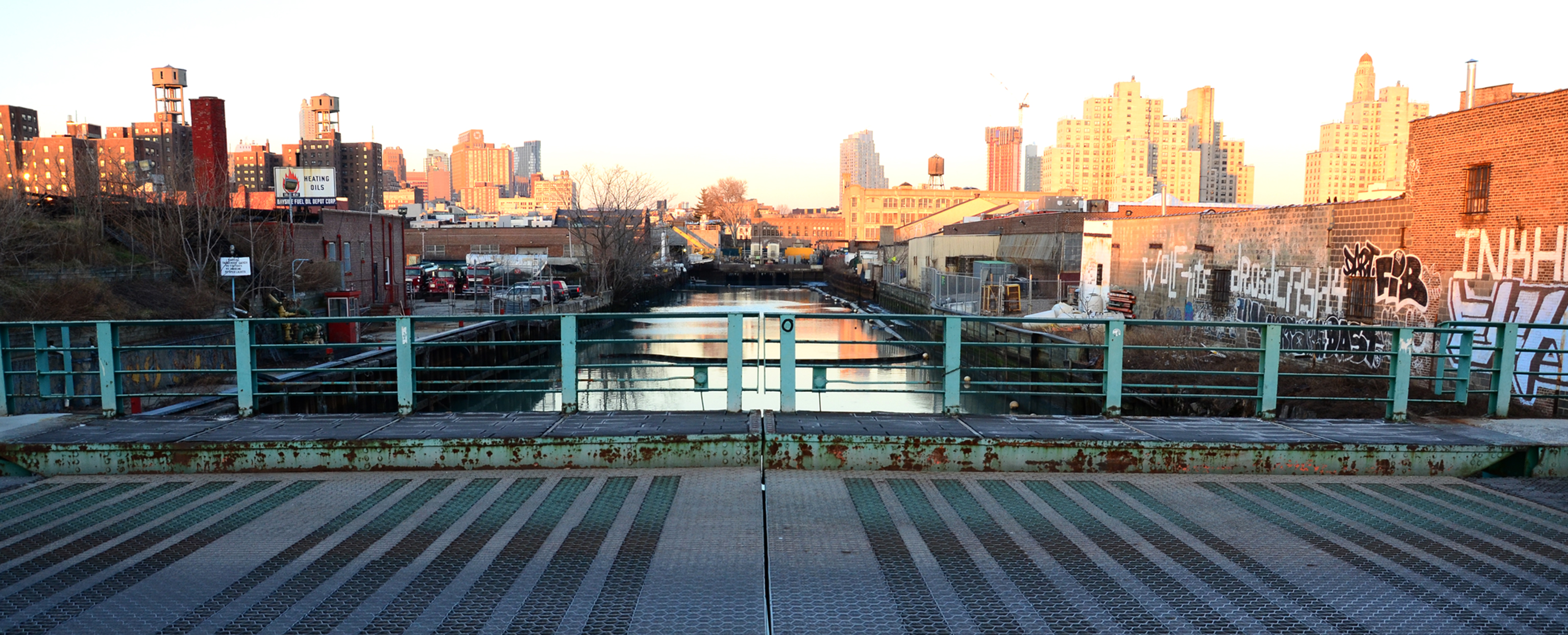
- Coordinates: 40°40′46″N 73°59′18″W
- Carries: 2 lanes of Union Street, pedestrians and bicyclists
- Crosses: Gowanus Canal
- Locale: Brooklyn, New York, U.S.

History
- Opened: 1905

Statistics
- Toll: free

Location
- Interactive map of Union Street Bridge

The Union Street Bridge is a double leaf Scherzer rolling lift bascule carrying Union Street over the Gowanus Canal in the New York City borough of Brooklyn. The bridge cost $85,206.85 and opened on March 4, 1905.

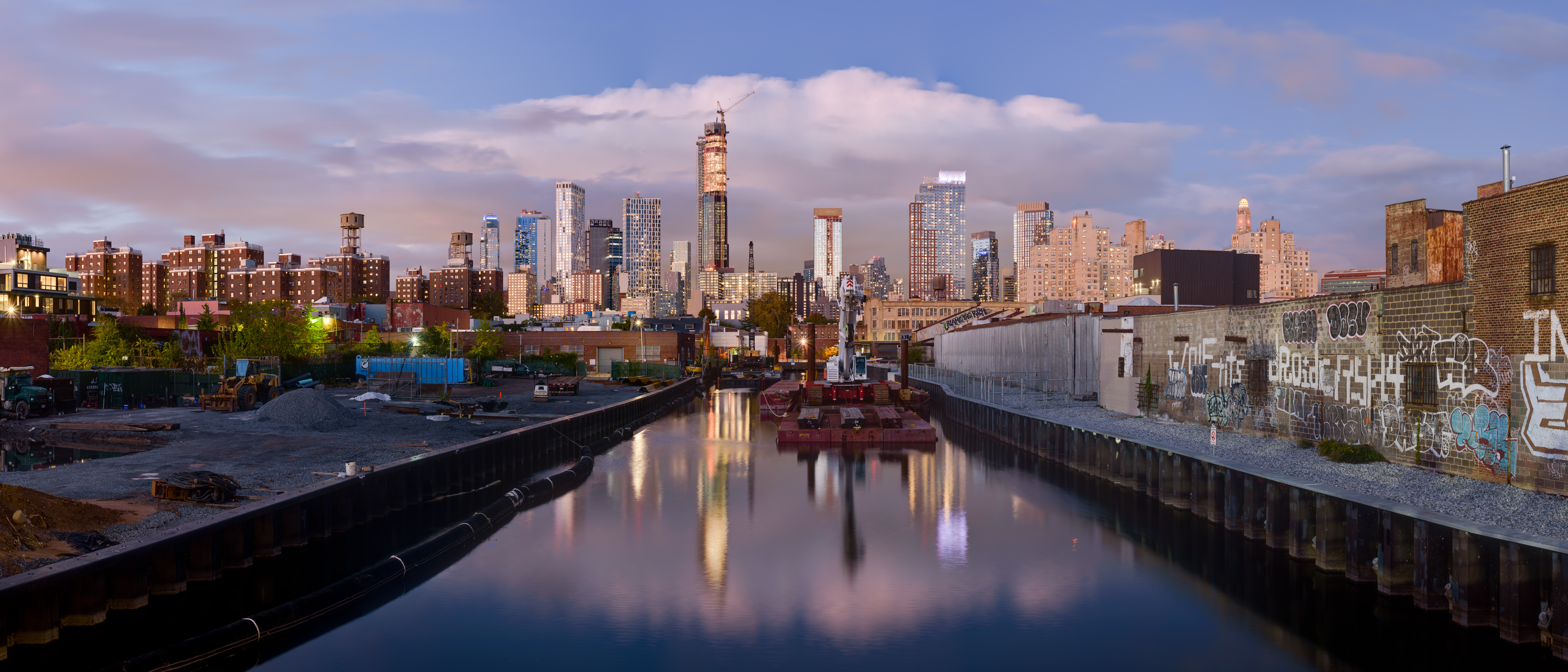
View of the Gowanus Canal from Union Street Bridge
