= Gritton =

Gritton is a surname. Notable people with the surname include:

- Bonnie Gritton (fl. early 21st century), American classical pianist
- Martin Gritton (born 1978), Scottish footballer
- Susan Gritton (born 1965), English soprano

== See also ==
- Gritten
