= Henry Gritten =

English painter

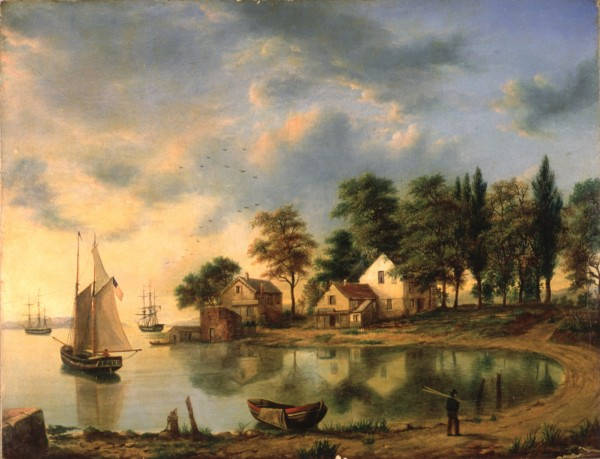
Sunset at Gowanus Bay in New York

Henry Gritten (1818 – 14 January 1873) was an English/Australian landscape painter.

== Biography ==
In 1848 Gritten went to the United States in Brooklyn and exhibited at the American Art Union (1850 to 1851) and the National Academy of Design (1850 to 1854). Gritten painted two New Hampshire scenes which were exhibited at the National Academy of Design: Kearsarge Mountain (1850) and Recollection of New Hampshire Scenery (1851).
