= Hermann Reinheimer =

British biologist and writer

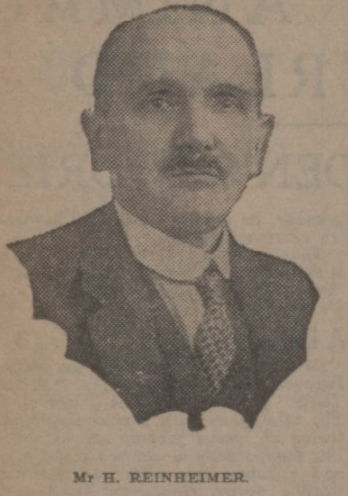
- Born: 4 August 1872; Hesse
- Died: 29 December 1964 (aged 92)
- Occupations: Biologist, writer

Hermann Reinheimer (4 August 1872 – 29 December 1964) also known as Harry Ryner was a British biologist and early science writer who proposed cooperation in evolution and symbiogenesis.

== Biography ==
Reinheimer was born in Hesse and became a British citizen in 1901. He was a critic of the Darwinian view of struggle for existence. He authored Evolution by Cooperation (1913) and Symbiogenesis (1915) which were influential in developing the concept of symbiosis. He identified symbiosis as a "law of nature". According to science historian Jan Sapp "Reinheimer is virtually unknown among contemporary biologists and historians."

Reinheimer coined the term "bioeconomics" in 1913. In 1915, Reinheimer was one of the first writers to discuss symbiogenesis. However, the term was used without reference to Konstantin Mereschkowski who had previously written on the subject, leading cell biologist Francisco Carrapiço to speculate that Reinheimer was unfamiliar with Mereschkowski's work. In his 1915 book on the topic, Reinheimer defined symbiogenesis as:

The production and increase of values throughout organic life by means of a symbiotic principle of co-operation or reciprocity between different organs of the individual, by evolved and complex body, as well as between different organisms in a species or different species, genera, orders, etc., even in the last and most fundamental way between plant and animal in the web of life.

Reinheimer was a vegetarian. Little about his life is known, he worked as a stockbroker and was described as living in Surbiton, London in the 1950s. His books were published under his name "Hermann Reinheimer" but his legal name became Harry Ryner.

== Reception ==
Reinheimer's book Nutrition and Evolution described the importance of nutrition as a factor in evolution. A review in the Nature journal suggested that "the conclusion is sound, but we cannot say this of many of the arguments." His book Evolution by Co-Operation received a mixed review in the British Medical Journal which concluded that it is an "interesting and suggestive work".

Reinheimer's views on symbiogenesis were seen as controversial during his time. In 1916, American zoologist William Lawrence Tower described his book Symbiogenesis as the "least logical, worst constructed, most inaccurate and irrational book upon evolution that has happened in a long time." Other reviews were more positive. For example, the Scientific American commented that "even though one may not wholly surrender to Mr. Reinheimer's argument, or accord to his theory that supreme importance with which he invests it, there are in his volume so many important related facts, and so much pause-compelling suggestion, that his work must be reckoned with in any future study of Nature's methods." The book was positively reviewed in The Lancet journal which concluded it would be read with interest by many biologists.

Anthropologist Ashley Montagu wrote that Reinheimer's book Symbiosis "which is all too little known, presents a very stimulating and well-balanced account of the facts". The book was criticized by botanist C. Stuart Gager for containing "numerous statements about plants that are inaccurate or incorrect, and sure to mislead readers not familiar with botany." Botanist Edward James Salisbury described the work as "frankly unorthodox" and noted that its facts are "often only partially apprehended".

== Publications ==
- Nutrition and Evolution (1909)
- Survival and Reproduction (1910)
- Evolution by Co-Operation: A Study in Bio-Economics (1913)
- Symbiogenesis: The Universal Law of Progressive Evolution (1915)
- Symbiosis: A Socio-Physiological Study of Evolution (1920)
- Symbiosis V. Cancer (1922)
- Cancer and Remedial Diet (1924)
- Evolution at the Crossways (1924)
- How to Avert Cancer (1924)
- The Tragic Folly of Our Meat-Consumption (1925)
- Evolution Re-Interpreted (1927)
- Evolution by Symbiosis (1928)
- Why Get Cancer?: A Vindication of Food-Reform (1928)
- Symbiosis: The Cure of Cancer and of Selectionitis (1930)
- Deliverance From Cancer: A Vindication of Food Reform and Nature Cure (1931)
- Synthetic Biology and the Moral Universe (1931)
- Darwin: The Evil Genius of Science and His Nordic Religion (1933)
- Shall Cancer Conquer Unopposed (1934)
- Cancer Expounded and Expunged (1949)
- How to Live (1954)
