= Brooklyn Botanic Garden =

Botanical garden in New York City

- Current logo

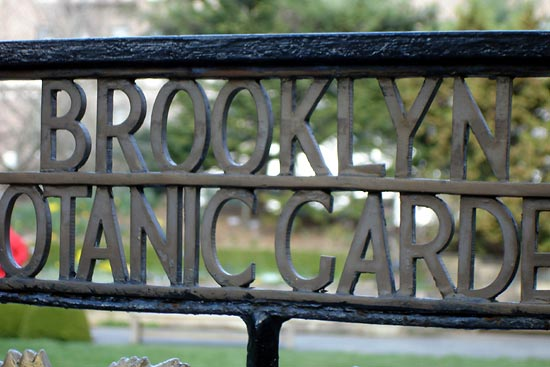
- Brooklyn Botanic Garden
- Interactive map of Brooklyn Botanic Garden
- 40°40′12″N 73°57′45″W
- Date opened: May 13, 1911
- Location: 990 Washington Avenue, Crown Heights, Brooklyn, New York 11225; United States
- Land area: 52 acres (21 ha)
- No. of species: 14,000
- Annual visitors: 800,000 (2015)
- Public transit: New York City Subway: at Franklin Avenue/Botanic Garden; at Prospect Park; New York City Bus: B16, B41, B43, B48
- Website: www.bbg.org

Brooklyn Botanic Garden (BBG) is a botanical garden in the borough of Brooklyn in New York City. The botanical garden occupies 52 acres (21 ha) in central Brooklyn, close to Mount Prospect Park, Prospect Park, and the Brooklyn Museum. Designed by the Olmsted Brothers, BBG holds over 14,000 taxa of plants and has over 800,000 visitors each year. It includes a number of specialty gardens, plant collections, and structures. BBG hosts numerous educational programs, plant-science and conservation, and community horticulture initiatives, in addition to a herbarium collection.

The site of Brooklyn Botanic Garden was first designated in 1897, following three proposals for botanic gardens in Brooklyn in the 19th century. BBG opened in May 1911, on the site of an ash dump, and was initially operated by the Brooklyn Institute. Most of BBG's expansions were carried out over the next three decades under the tenure of its first director, C. Stuart Gager. BBG began operating three additional sites in the New York metropolitan area in the 1950s and 1960s, while its main garden in Brooklyn fell into decline. The original Brooklyn Botanic Garden was expanded and restored substantially starting in the 1980s, and additional structures were built through the 2010s.

BBG's landscape includes many specialty gardens and a group of buildings on its eastern boundary, accessed from three entrances. A brook flows from the Japanese Hill-and-Pond Garden in the north to the Water Garden in the south. BBG's other specialty gardens include rose, native flora, Shakespeare, fragrance, and children's gardens. There are also more formal landscape features such as an overlook, a celebrity path, the Osborne Garden, and a cherry esplanade. The structures include the 1980s-era Steinhardt Conservatory, the Laboratory Administration Building (which contains a library), and a palm house dating from the 1910s.

== History ==
=== Early proposals ===
Prior to the construction of the present Brooklyn Botanic Garden, there had been three proposals for botanic gardens in the then-independent city of Brooklyn in the 19th century, though only one of these botanic gardens was ever built. André Parmentier had created the Horticultural and Botanic Garden of Brooklyn in October 1825 within Prospect Heights, on a plot bounded by Sixth, Atlantic, and Carleton Avenues and Bergen Street; this garden only lasted until about 1830. Brooklyn resident Thomas Hunt granted $50,000 in 1855 for the establishment of a botanic garden in Sunset Park (between Fifth Avenue, 57th Street, Sixth Avenue, and 60th Street). The Hunt Horticultural and Botanical Garden sought to raise $150,000, but the garden was never built at that location.

The third plan for a botanical garden in Brooklyn was included in the plans for Prospect Park, which was approved in 1859. In February 1860, a group of fifteen commissioners submitted suggestions for park locations in Brooklyn, including a 320-acre (130 ha) plot centered on present-day Mount Prospect Park and bounded by Warren Street to the north; Vanderbilt, Ninth, and Tenth Avenues to the west; Third and Ninth Streets to the south; and Washington Avenue to the east. Egbert Viele began drawing plans for the park, which was to straddle Flatbush Avenue and include Prospect Hill and the land now occupied by the Brooklyn Public Library, Brooklyn Botanic Garden, and the Brooklyn Museum. The botanical garden was initially planned to be located along the shores of the park's lake. The onset of the Civil War stopped further activity; following the war, the triangle of land to the east of Flatbush Avenue was excluded from the park. The botanical garden within Prospect Park was not built. The northeast portion of the triangle served as an ash dump until just before Brooklyn Botanic Garden was established.

=== Creation ===
==== Legislation and funding ====
On May 18, 1897, as the city moved toward consolidation, the New York State Legislature reserved 39 acres (16 ha) for a botanic garden. The site became part of Institute Park in 1902. The garden was to be run under the auspices of the Brooklyn Institute of Arts and Sciences, which until the 1970s included Brooklyn Museum, Brooklyn Children's Museum, and Brooklyn Academy of Music. By 1901, the institute sought to acquire a site on the eastern side of Flatbush Avenue for the botanical garden. This site had also been proposed as the location of a proposed Brooklyn university, but the institute wanted to establish a botanical garden on the site. Several of the institute's donors proposed in 1905 to give $25,000 for the upkeep of a "scientific botanic garden" next to the Brooklyn Museum. The next year, the donors doubled this award to $50,000. City officials endorsed the creation of the botanical garden in 1907, and supporters of the institute donated thousands of dollars toward the botanical garden. Alfred Tredway White, a trustee of the Brooklyn Institute, leased a 40-acre (16 ha) site behind the Brooklyn Museum from the city.

Although the New York City Board of Estimate approved Brooklyn Botanic Garden's creation in June 1909, it did not approve another agreement that would allow the Brooklyn Institute to maintain the botanical garden. By the end of that year, the Olmsted Brothers had been hired as landscape designers, while McKim, Mead & White had been hired as architects for the botanical garden's buildings. The Board of Estimate voted on December 10, 1909, to allow the city and the Brooklyn Institute to sign a maintenance agreement for the botanical garden. New York City government and the Brooklyn Institute signed the maintenance agreement on December 28, and an endowment fund for BBG was created three days later. C. Stuart Gager was hired as BBG's first director in March 1910. At this point, BBG was authorized to spend between $2,000 and $2,500 annually on plantings. That June, the city government appropriated $25,000 for Brooklyn Botanic Garden's plant houses.

==== Construction and opening ====
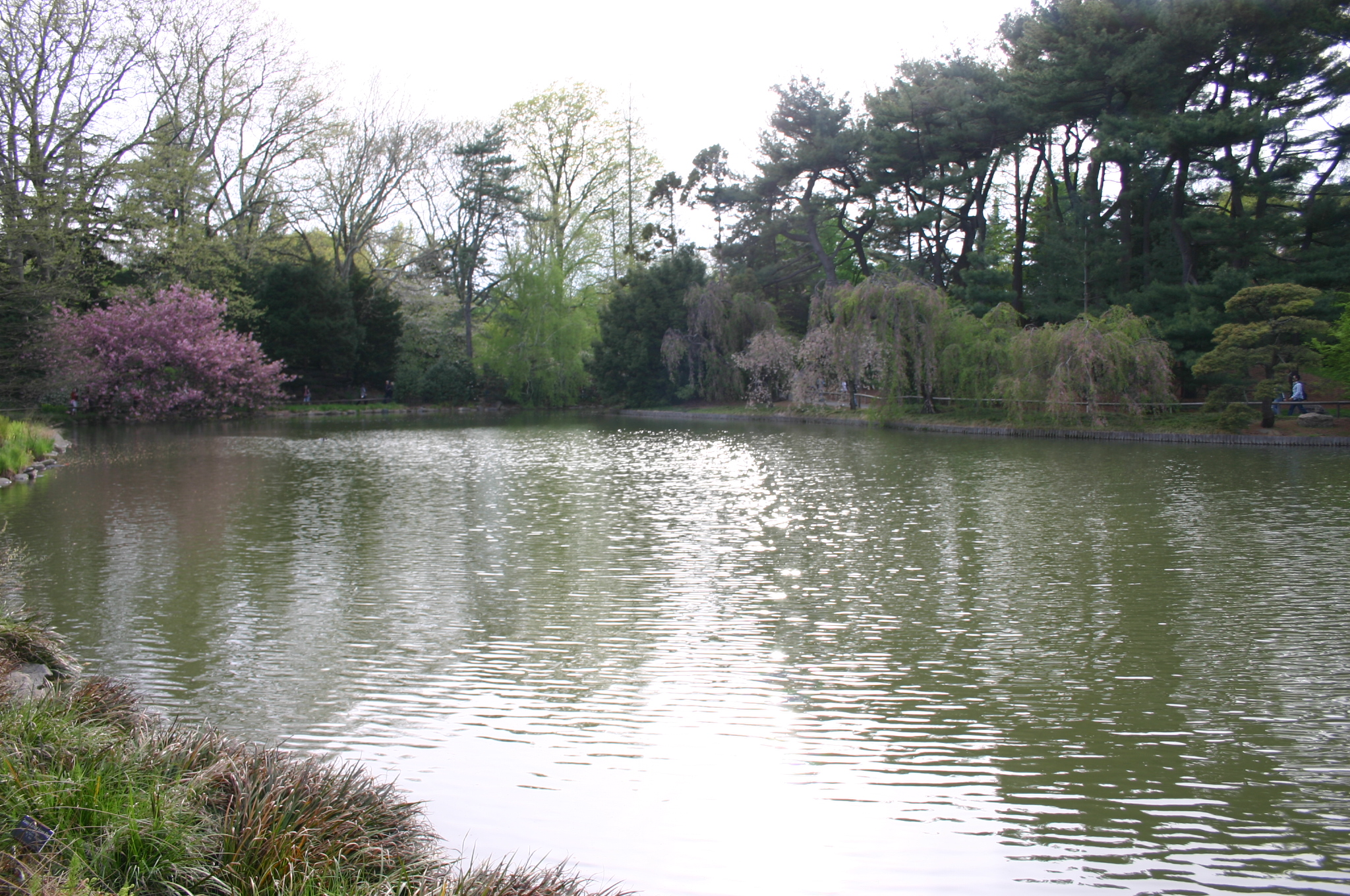
The pond at BBG

Gager wanted to create "an animated textbook in botany", with a Palm House and laboratories facing Washington Avenue, as well as a landscape with valleys, hills, a pond, and rocks. In contrast to older botanical gardens, Brooklyn Botanic Garden was not arranged based solely on taxonomic classifications; the Olmsted Brothers sought to make the garden aesthetically pleasing as well. McKim, Mead & White began drawing up plans in late 1910 for a laboratory and administration building with a 480-seat lecture hall, laboratories, and classrooms. The New York City government turned over 43 acres (17 ha) to the Brooklyn Institute in February 1911, and the institute's director Franklin W. Hooper requested the same month that more land be allocated to BBG. McKim, Mead & White had completed plans for two wings of the Palm House and the first part of the Laboratory Administration Building that March. The next month, the institute decided to build only one part of the Palm House, as the botanical garden only had a $50,000 budget. (Note: The laboratory building was to cost $33,000, while the Palm House was to cost $17,000.)

The first section of BBG, the Native Flora Garden, opened on May 13, 1911; the date was chosen to coincide with the birthday of the naturalist Carl Linnaeus. (Note: Linnaeus's birthday was on May 13 according to the Swedish calendar or May 23 according to the Gregorian calendar. See Blunt, Wilfrid (2001). Linnaeus: the compleat naturalist. London: Frances Lincoln. p. 12. ISBN 978-0-7112-1841-3.) At the time, the plants had temporary labels, and work on the Palm House and laboratory had not started. By late 1911, the Brooklyn Institute was planting shrubs and trees and were curating BBG's lawn. The plantings included between 150 and 200 species of shrubs that grew within 100 miles (160 km) of Brooklyn. BBG staff used a temporary headquarters in the Brooklyn Museum while BBG was being completed. Harold Caparn was appointed as the landscape architect in 1912, serving in that position until 1945. BBG hired Cockerill & Little Co. to build the Laboratory Administration Building in January 1912 and began constructing the structure three months later. That September, the city government gave BBG an additional 3 acres (1.2 ha) of land, abutting the museum and reservoir.

Workers began constructing the second section of the Palm House and landscaping the northern section of the botanical garden in early 1913. The completion of the Laboratory Administration Building was postponed because of difficulties in obtaining roof tiles and structural steel. The first portions of the Laboratory Administration Building and the Palm House were being completed by mid-1913, and these structures opened in December 1913. At the time, the Palm House had about 250 specimens from 140 species. Dirt from the Brooklyn Botanical Garden was used to flatten land in Prospect Park, and workers also landscaped BBG's watercourses and laid out paths. The ongoing work forced officials to close off about two-thirds of the botanical garden's area to the public. BBG launched a children's garden in 1914, which was one of the first of its kind in the world. By the end of that year, workers were constructing a Japanese garden and a rock garden.

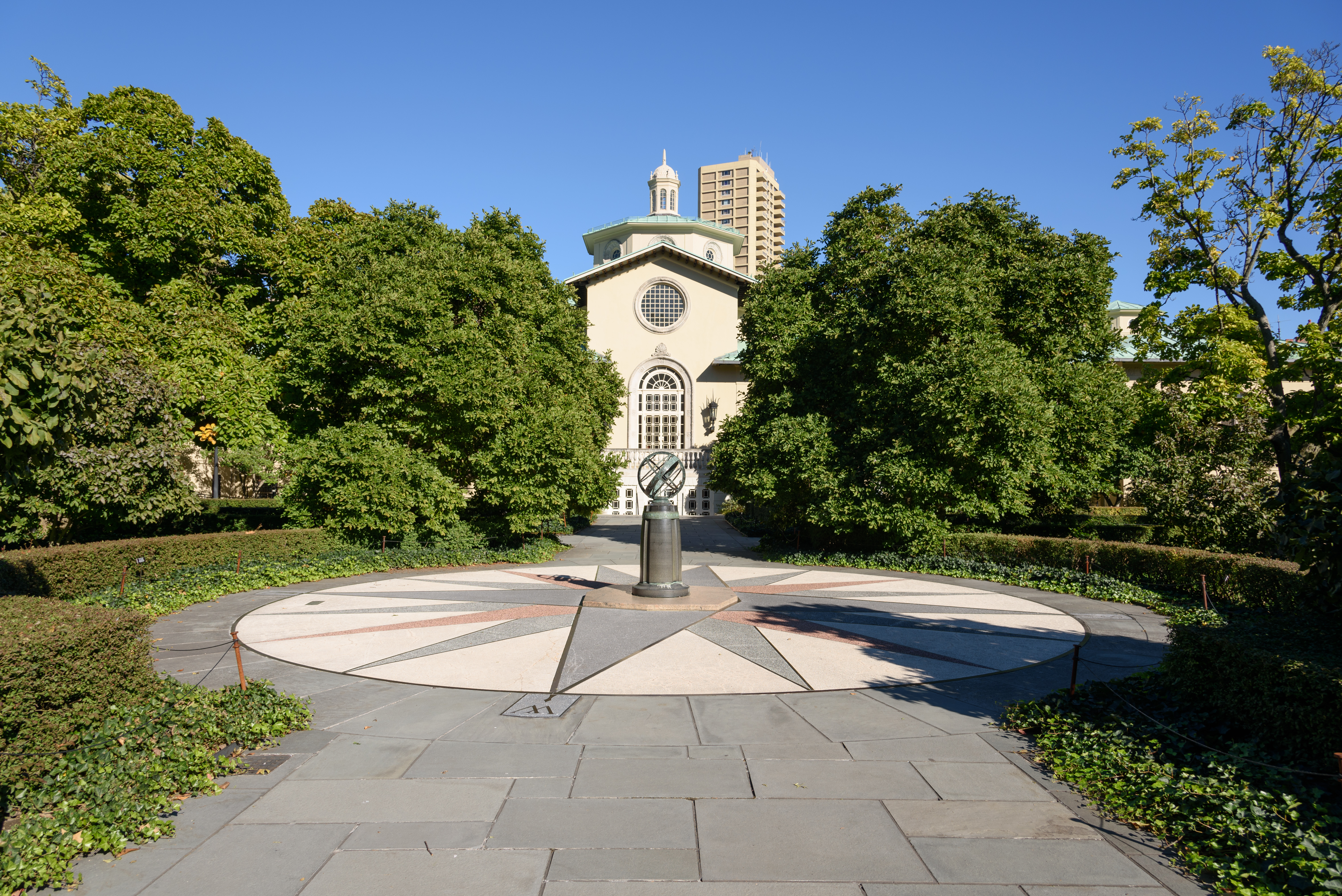
The Laboratory Administration Building (in background) was dedicated in April 1917.

BBG's Japanese garden opened on the northeastern corner of the grounds in June 1915, next to the lake. At that time, BBG started admitting visitors every day of the week; the grounds had been closed during the previous year because workers were regrading the paths. McKim, Mead & White filed plans for expansions of the Palm House and the Laboratory Administration Building in August 1915 at a projected cost of $150,000. The Board of Estimate approved the rock garden in March 1916, and the Laboratory Administration Building's cornerstone was laid at a groundbreaking ceremony that April. The rock garden was completed in May 1916. The same year, the third section of the Palm House was built, and contracts for the Palm House's fourth section were awarded. The Laboratory Administration Building and Palm House were nearly complete in early 1917 and were dedicated on April 19–21, 1917. The children's building was finished the same year.

=== Operation ===
Caparn designed most of BBG's grounds in the botanical garden's first three decades of operation, including the Osborne Garden, Cranford Rose Garden, Magnolia Plaza, and Plant Collection. For most of the 20th century, BBG could not expand beyond 52 acres (21 ha) because of space constraints. BBG initially did not charge admission.

==== 1920s and 1930s ====
By the early 1920s, BBG had 330,000 visitors a year, including over 15,000 students from across Brooklyn. During 1921, BBG staff planted 2,000 lily bulbs within its Lily Pool Terrace, as well as thousands of daffodils and crocus bulbs. BBG also planted thousands of asters east of the Laboratory Administration Building. Daniel Chester French designed the Alfred Tredway White Memorial for the botanical garden in 1922 following White's death. John D. Rockefeller Jr. offered to donate $250,000 to BBG in 1925 on the condition that the botanical garden raise matching funds. By then, 500,000 people (including 50,000 students) visited BBG annually, and BBG gave lectures and classes to another 25,000 people per year. The same year, Ernest F. Coe donated 32 bonsai to allow BBG to establish its Bonsai Collection, and Henry C. Folger gave BBG $500 to establish a Shakespeare garden, which opened in May 1925. Gager announced in 1927 that BBG would create a rose garden, following a $10,000 donation from Walter V. Cranford (later increased to $15,000). The rose garden opened on May 8, 1928, and was finished that June. An anonymous donor contributed funds for a stone bridge at BBG in December 1928, replacing a wooden bridge across the botanical garden's lake.

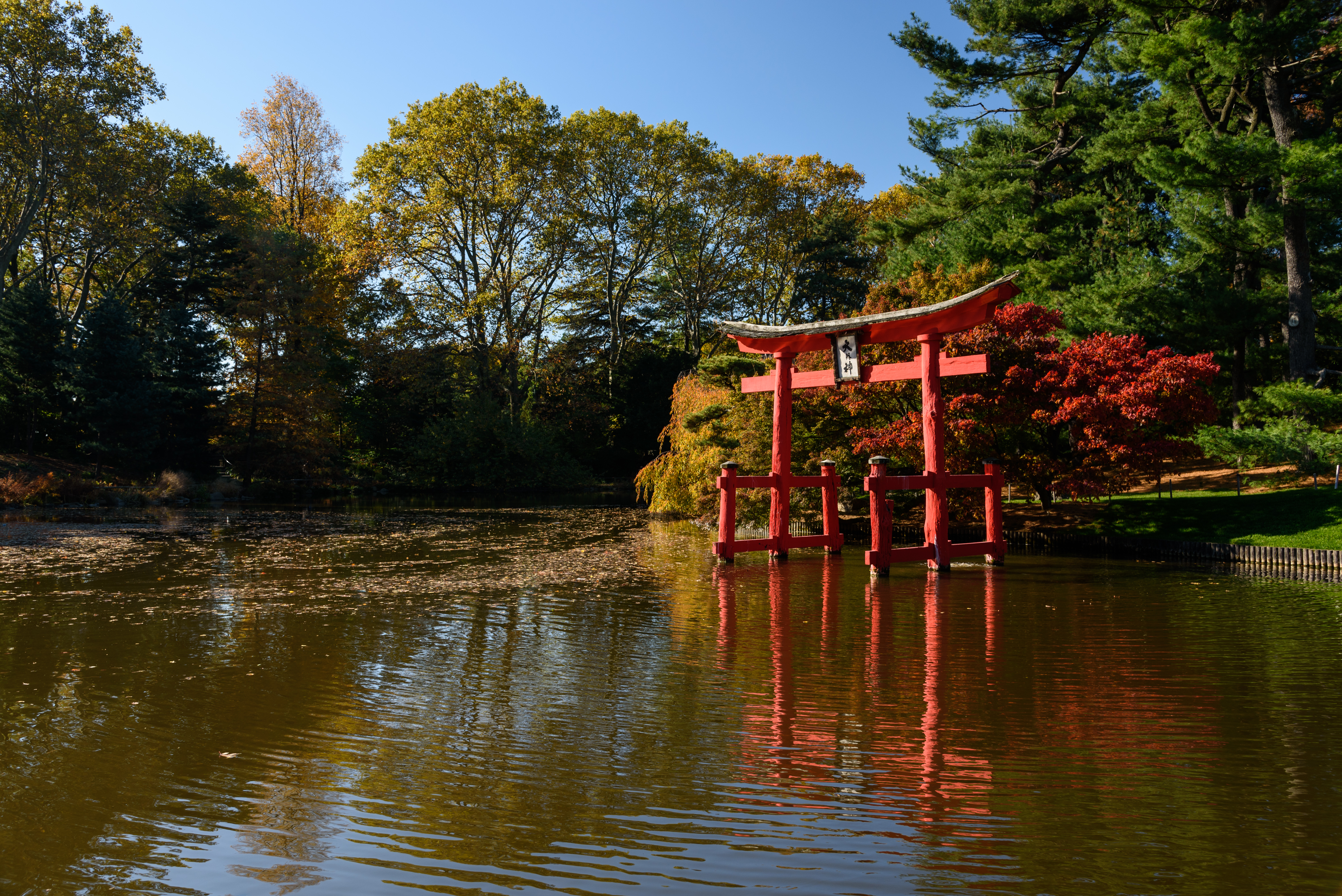
The Japanese Hill-and-Pond Garden was renovated in the early 1930s.

Gager announced in June 1929 that an ornamental gate designed by McKim, Mead & White would be installed at BBG's Flatbush Avenue entrance, following a donation from Richard Young. The next month, BBG trustee Alfred W. Jenkins donated funds for two additional stone "rustic bridges". By that October, the gate and several new bridges within BBG were nearly finished; the gate was dedicated in May 1930. During the same time, ten garden seats and eight drinking fountains were donated to BBG, and Jenkins agreed to donate a fountain and another rustic bridge in 1930, BBG awarded contracts for the construction of a 500-by-90-foot (152 by 27 m) plaza in front of the Laboratory Administration Building in April 1930, more than a decade after plans for the plaza had been drawn up. Gager also planned to build three other gates, an overlook, a north addition next to the Brooklyn Museum, garden seats, and plantings within the Native Flora Garden. The Japanese garden was expanded as well, reopening in 1931.

In 1933, a redesigned native wildflower garden, the Laboratory Administration Building plaza, and the overlook were completed, and the BBG Women's Auxiliary donated magnolias to the garden's Magnolia Plaza. Civil Works Administration (CWA) workers began landscaping the 2.5-acre (1.0 ha) north addition next to the Brooklyn Museum the same year. The CWA crew also constructed a new entrance to BBG from Eastern Parkway. Most of the north addition was completed in 1935, when BBG had 1.35 million annual visitors. Afterward, BBG staff planted a formal garden along the north addition; a "wall garden" next to Mount Prospect Park; and an herb garden. Mrs. Walter V. Cranford donated a Rose Arc Pool to BBG in 1936. BBG's Japanese shrine burned down in January 1938; the herb garden at the northeast corner of BBG, planted by the Women's Auxiliary, was dedicated that September. Sade Elisabeth Osborne dedicated the Dean Clay Osborne memorial at BBG in April 1939.

==== 1940s and 1950s ====
BBG attracted about 1.8 million annual visitors at the beginning of the 1940s with an endowment fund of nearly $1.4 million. The Cherry Esplanade was created in 1941 after the Women's Auxiliary donated four rows of cherry trees. An ivy garden was also dedicated the same year. The Japanese Hill-and-Pond Garden was closed from 1941 to 1947 because of anti-Japanese sentiment during World War II. BBG rehired McKim, Mead & White in 1942 to design a $200,000 annex to the Laboratory Administration Building, but the annex was not completed because of financial shortfalls. Gager, BBG's first director, died in 1943 and was succeeded by George S. Avery Jr. the following year. Michael Tuch and his wife donated a wrought iron gate for BBG's Eastern Parkway entrance in 1945, and the gate was dedicated in March 1946.

By the early 1950s, Avery planned to expand BBG's children's garden by 1 acre (0.40 ha) by covering the open-cut Franklin Avenue subway line. At the time, the children's garden only had space for 250 plots, but a thousand children wanted to use the children's garden each year. BBG accommodated 1.35 million visitors annually, more than the larger New York Botanical Garden did, but received less funding from the city. The Women's Auxiliary proposed creating a "garden of fragrance" at BBG in May 1954; the project was inspired by a British garden for the blind. Construction of the 1.5-acre (6,100 m^{2}) garden, located just north of the Laboratory Administration Building, began in October 1954. The fragrance garden was dedicated in June 1955.

Elizabeth Van Brunt sold 223 acres (90 ha) of forest at Kitchawan in Westchester County, New York, to BBG in 1956 for use as a research center. BBG planned to move its nursery to Westchester to make way for a 1-acre (0.40 ha) expansion of the children's garden. Workers restored BBG's paths, and added new trees and benches, in 1958 as part of a project designed by Clarence C. Combs. Local women also volunteered to cultivate the garden after BBG staff went on strike for several months in 1959.

==== 1960s and 1970s ====
A Shinto shrine was dedicated at BBG's Japanese Garden in May 1960, replacing a shrine that vandals had burned down. The research center in Westchester was dedicated the same month. By that October, BBG had recorded 50 million all-time visitors. Takuma Paul Tono designed a replica of a stone garden at Ryōan-ji after BBG received a private donation in 1961. The stone garden, dedicated in May 1963, contained 15 granite stones of varying colors and sizes. The Native Flora Garden was closed in 1963 due to a lack of funding; it did not reopen for two decades. By the mid-1960s, Avery said BBG's finances were in decline, as most of the garden's funding came from wealthy benefactors who were moving away from Brooklyn. Furthermore, an increase in crime had caused BBG officials to close off most of the botanical garden's exits by the end of the decade, and litter was beginning to accumulate in the surrounding area. BBG had an average of 5,000 daily visitors by the late 1960s.

Avery served as BBG's director until 1969, and Louis B. Martin briefly served as BBG's third director for the next two years, until the beginning of 1972. As early as 1971, the city considered allowing the Brooklyn Botanic Garden to charge admission. Elizabeth Scholtz, BBG's assistant curator of instruction, was appointed as the garden's acting director in 1972 and officially became the garden's fourth director the next year, making her the first woman to lead a large U.S. botanical garden. Under Scholtz's leadership, BBG shifted its focus to its three "outreach stations" in Westchester County and on Long Island, as there was very little space to expand the original garden in Brooklyn. Although public interest in BBG had grown, the original garden in Brooklyn only employed seven full-time instructors and some part-time instructors. The Ryōan-ji stone garden, which had been closed for several years because of a lack of funds, reopened in 1973.

BBG split from the Brooklyn Institute during the 1970s. The Women's Auxiliary of BBG launched a docent program, Volunteer Garden Guide, in 1974. Continuing financial problems forced BBG to close on Mondays starting in 1975 for the first time in its history. The change was attributed to the fact that BBG's annual operating budget had come to exceed $2 million, a two-thirds increase from the $1.2 million budget in 1970, but the city had committed to funding a smaller portion of BBG's expenses. BBG had 800,000 annual visitors by the late 1970s; although this was half the number of visitors that the garden had recorded in the mid-20th century, BBG was still more popular than comparable botanical gardens. The Shakespeare Garden reopened in June 1979 after being relocated from its original location near the Children's Garden.

==== 1980s and 1990s ====
Donald E. Moore became BBG's fifth leader in 1980. Under his tenure, BBG was expanded, and its membership grew threefold to 25,000. BBG began allowing events, such as parties and weddings, on its grounds in 1982; it also started hosting an annual cherry blossom festival that year. In 1983, BBG reopened its native flora garden, which had been closed for twenty years, after hiring a gardener and two assistants. By the mid-1980s, the botanical garden had over 600,000 annual visitors, as well as 11,000 members from around the world. BBG also had 15,000 specimens representing 2,000 species. At that time, BBG's Palm House and the adjacent wooden greenhouses had become severely deteriorated. The Celebrity Path was created in 1985 following a donation from the Brooklyn Union Gas Company.

BBG announced in 1984 that it would construct a new conservatory and restore the Palm House for $16 million. The city and BBG would each pay for half of the renovation. The conservatory was to be designed by Davis, Brody & Associates, who were also responsible for renovating the Palm House and Administration Building. Work on the new conservatory commenced in May 1984; it was the first major building erected in BBG since the 1910s. The conservatory replaced three smaller gardens, including the Ryōan-ji stone garden. The conservatory's $25 million cost included $3 million from Michael and Judith Steinhardt and $11.65 million from the city government. The Steinhardt Conservatory was named for the couple in March 1988 and opened on May 19, 1988. BBG also renovated the Palm House into an education center and event space, and it erected an education building with greenhouses, displays, and classrooms. The renovation added 80,000 square feet (7,400 m^{2}), more than doubling the amount of space dedicated to displaying plants and exhibits. A gift shop opened next to the Steinhardt Conservatory in June 1989, and a discovery center sponsored by Chase Manhattan Bank opened in September 1989.

Judith Zuk was named as BBG's president in 1990 after Moore resigned. Several of BBG's gardens were renovated under Zuk's tenure. The Discovery Garden opened next to the Discovery Center in September 1992, and the viewing pavilion in the Japanese Hill-and-Pond Garden was renovated in 1993 as part of a larger $1.5 million rehabilitation of the Japanese garden. In 1996, the garden began charging admission of $3 per adult after cuts in public and private funding and increases in operating costs. Community groups objected that the admission fee would negatively impact local residents, but Zuk said the fee would raise at least half a million dollars per year. To attract visitors during the winter, BBG began hosting model train displays in late 1998. The Japanese Hill-and-Pond Garden was renovated starting in 1999; the project was supposed to cost $3 million and was funded mostly by the New York City Council. The project included repainting the torii, restoring the viewing pavilion and Turtle Island, making the lower level accessible, and planting extra trees. The Japanese garden reopened in May 2000.

==== 2000s to present ====
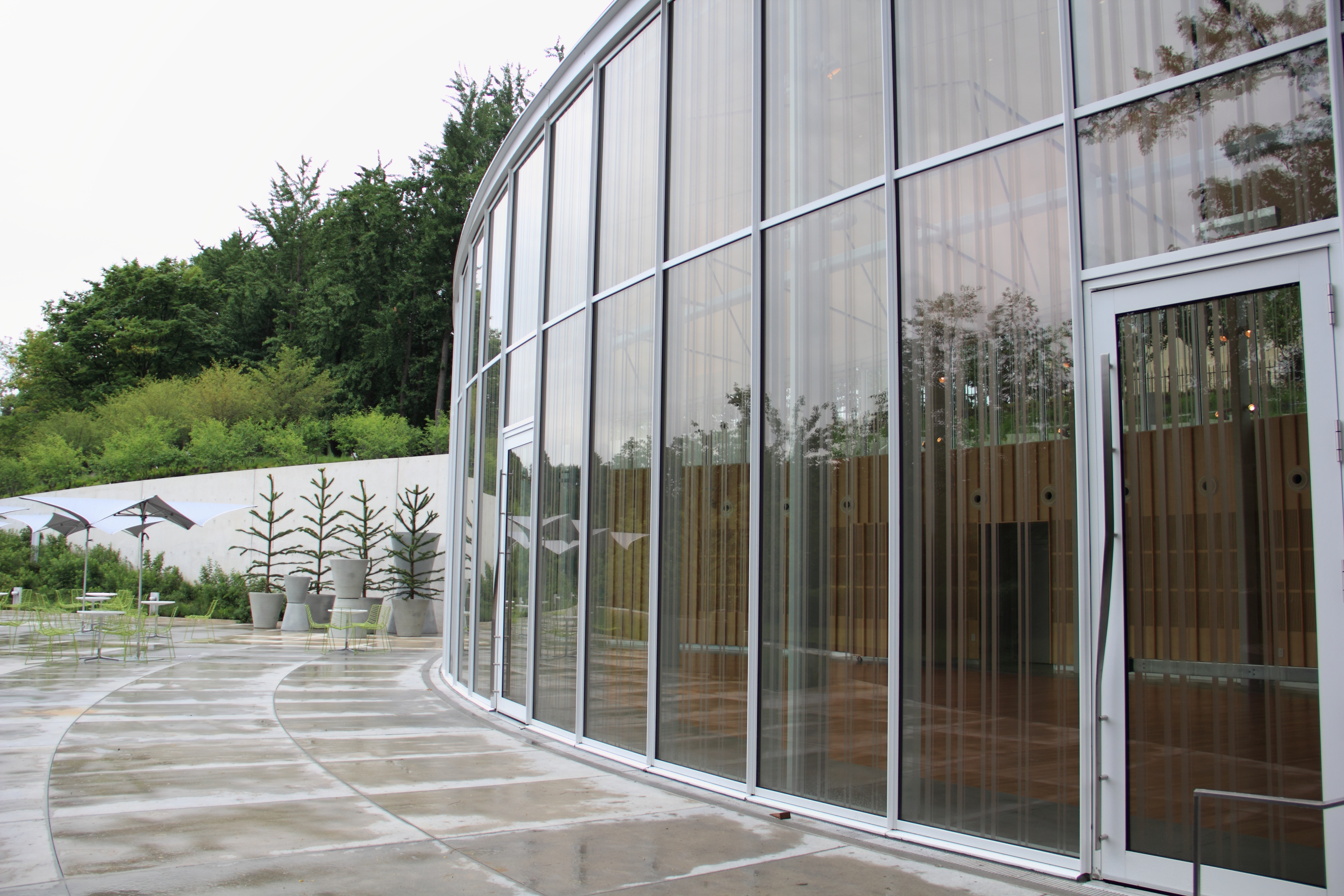
The visitor center on Washington Avenue opened in May 2012.

When the entrance to the Brooklyn Museum was rebuilt in 2002, some of BBG's cherry trees had to be cut down. The entrance on Eastern Parkway was rebuilt in 2003 at a cost of $2.5 million. The previous entrance had been too narrow and was set back from the street, making it difficult for visitors to see the entrance. The new entrance opened in 2005. After Zuk retired in 2005, the Magnolia Plaza was named in her honor, and Scot Medbury was selected as president the same year. Medbury planned to build a party room, restaurant, and visitor center; by then, BBG had 700,000 annual visitors and an operating budget of nearly $15 million. The Cranford Rose Garden was restored in 2006, followed by the C.V. Starr Bonsai Museum the next year.

BBG's Laboratory Building was designated as a city landmark in 2007. The same year, as part of the Campaign for the Next Century, BBG started to raise money for new gardens, entrances, and a visitor center. Major donors to the campaign included Charlie and Irene Hamm, the Leon Levy Foundation, the Brooklyn Community Foundation, and the Robert Wilson Charitable Trust. BBG announced in 2009 that it would build a new entrance and visitor center on its northeastern corner, at the intersection of President Street and Washington Avenue. The botanical garden also planned to construct herb, woodland, and water gardens for its centennial. The visitor center was originally supposed to be located near the Cherry Walk but was moved to provide a better connection with the surrounding area. BBG relocated its herb garden in 2010, and the visitor center opened in May 2012. In June 2013, BBG opened an expansion of its Native Flora Garden. BBG suspended its science program that year because of budget cuts and the severe deterioration of BBG's science center in Crown Heights.

Brooklyn Botanic Garden was one of ten institutions that received the National Medal for Museum and Library Service in 2014, the centennial of its children's garden. BBG's Discovery Garden reopened in June 2015 after a renovation designed by Michael Van Valkenburgh. The Water Garden, which was named for Shelby White and Leon Levy after they donated $7.5 million to BBG, reopened in September 2016 following a restoration. The Yellow Magnolia Café opened within the Palm House in 2017. In 2018, BBG announced that it would re-landscape a hill leading to the Robert W. Wilson Overlook, which was rededicated in November 2019. The Elizabeth Scholtz Woodland Garden, named in honor of BBG's former director, also opened the same year. After a high-rise tower development was announced next to BBG at 960 Franklin Avenue, BBG protested the project in 2019; the towers were canceled after city officials rejected the project.

BBG was closed temporarily from March to August 2020 due to the COVID-19 pandemic in New York City. Former city parks commissioner Adrian Benepe was selected as BBG's eighth president in late 2020, after Medbury resigned. The retailer Anthropologie opened a Terrain home-and-garden store at BBG in 2024. A 14-story apartment building east of BBG was again proposed in the 2020s, amid an affordable-housing shortage in the neighborhood. The building's developer Bruce Eichner threatened to cancel the project following opposition from BBG and local residents, but he then proposed a modified plan following negotiations with BBG and city officials. In July 2026, Sue Donoghue became BBG's ninth president.

== Location and geography ==
Brooklyn Botanic Garden is in the central part of the New York City borough of Brooklyn, on the border of the Park Slope, Prospect Heights, and Crown Heights neighborhoods. It occupies much of the city block bounded by Eastern Parkway to the north, Washington Avenue to the east, Empire Boulevard to the south, and Flatbush Avenue to the southwest. BBG shares a large city block with Brooklyn's Central Library, Mount Prospect Park, and the Brooklyn Museum to the west and north. The far southeastern corner of the block contains the Brooklyn Central Office, Bureau of Fire Communications, at 35 Empire Boulevard. BBG covers 52 acres (21 ha), (Note: The New York City Department of Parks and Recreation gives a conflicting figure of 47.57 acres (19.25 ha), and some sources round the area to 50 acres (20 ha).) making it much smaller than the New York Botanical Garden, which covers 250 acres (100 ha). As of July 2025, BBG has 9,250 unique plant taxa.

Approximately 17,000 years ago the terminal moraine of the receding Wisconsin Glacier that formed Long Island, known as the Harbor Hill Moraine, established a string of hills and kettles as well as a lower lying outwash plain. Mount Prospect (or Prospect Hill), near the intersection of Flatbush Avenue and Eastern Parkway, is one of the tallest hills in Brooklyn, rising 200 feet (61 m) above sea level. As a result of the Wisconsin glaciation, there were a large number of rock outcroppings on the site prior to BBG's development. The northwestern and eastern edges of the site contained outcroppings, while the rest of the site was in an overwash plain. Boulders from the site were used in the rock garden, the native flora garden, bridges and dams across the artificial brook, and pedestals for various memorial tablets. In addition to 18 boulders in the rock garden, there are six outcroppings in other parts of BBG.

A brook runs across the garden from the Japanese Hill-and-Pond Garden in the north to the Shelby White and Leon Levy Water Garden in the south. Water from the Water Garden flowed into a storm drain prior to 2019, when the Water Conservation Project was completed. As a result of the project, water from the Water Garden is recirculated to the Japanese Hill-and-Pond Garden. This project was intended to save over 21 million U.S. gallons (79,000,000 L) of water per year, reducing by 95 percent the amount of water that the brook drew from the New York City water supply system.

=== Entrances ===
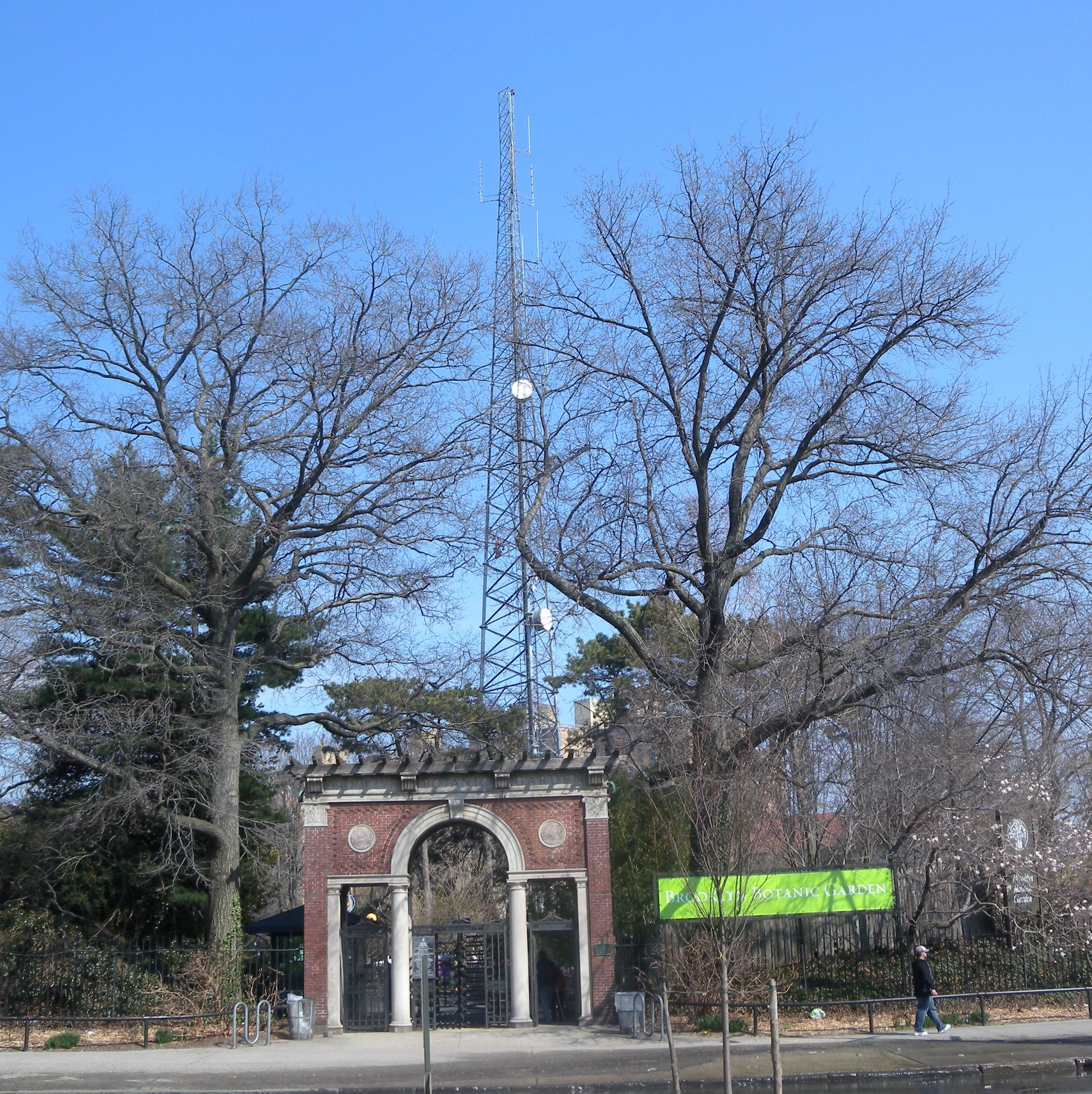
Entrance on Flatbush Avenue

Brooklyn Botanic Garden contains three entrances. The southwest entrance, at Flatbush Avenue near Empire Boulevard, is near the New York City Subway's Prospect Park station. McKim, Mead & White designed an Italian Renaissance Revival-style gate at Flatbush Avenue. The gate measures 20 feet (6.1 m) tall by 23 feet (7.0 m) wide and is made of brick and limestone. It contains three arches measuring 6.75 feet (2.06 m) deep, with a large central arch flanked by smaller entry and exit arches. Three similar arches were proposed, one on Eastern Parkway and two on Washington Avenue, but were not built. In the early 21st century, a visitor center was added next to the Flatbush Avenue entrance.

The northern entrance on Eastern Parkway is adjacent to an entrance to the New York City Subway's Eastern Parkway–Brooklyn Museum station. Prior to 2003, it contained a decorative metal gate dating from 1946. The gate contained plaques symbolizing three major crops, namely rice, maize, and wheat. In addition, there were vertical reliefs that symbolize plant evolution. The entrance was rebuilt in 2003 with a 16-foot-wide (4.9 m) stainless-steel gate flanked by 12-foot-high (3.7 m) curved steel walls. The new entrance, designed by James Polshek, also contains a 50-foot-high (15 m) cast-glass cone, as well as an embankment with information and ticket kiosks. Just within the entrance, there are boulders from New Jersey on either side of the path, as well as an overhanging birch branch.

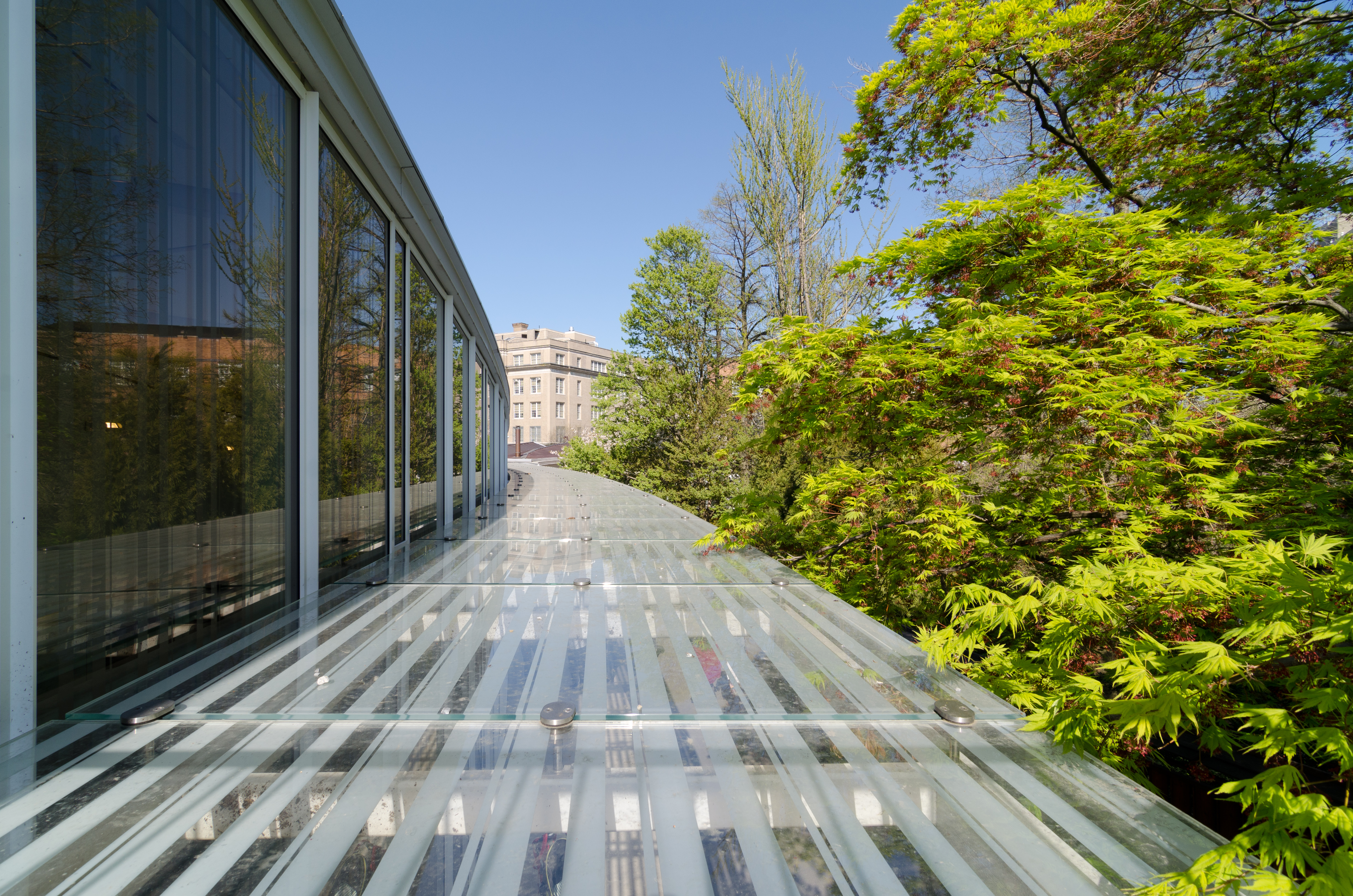
The deck above the visitor center on Washington Avenue

The eastern entrance on Washington Avenue abuts the Brooklyn Museum's parking lot. This entrance contains the Diane H. and Joseph S. Steinberg Visitor Center, designed by Weiss/Manfredi, and faces the botanical garden's northeastern corner. The structure is accessed by a set of stairs, which lead to a concrete plaza with a rock garden on its northern border (abutting the Brooklyn Museum's parking lot). The visitor center's Washington Avenue facade is made of concrete and glass, with a gabled copper roof, while the northern and southern facades of the visitor center are curved. The interior consists of a rectangular pavilion to the east, which houses the gift shop, and a 480-foot-long (150 m) curving pavilion to the west, with kitchens, event spaces, offices, and exhibits. The visitor center has a sloped green roof, covering 10,000 square feet (930 m^{2}). The structure is heated by a ground source heat pump system.

== Specialty gardens and collections ==
=== Osborne Garden ===
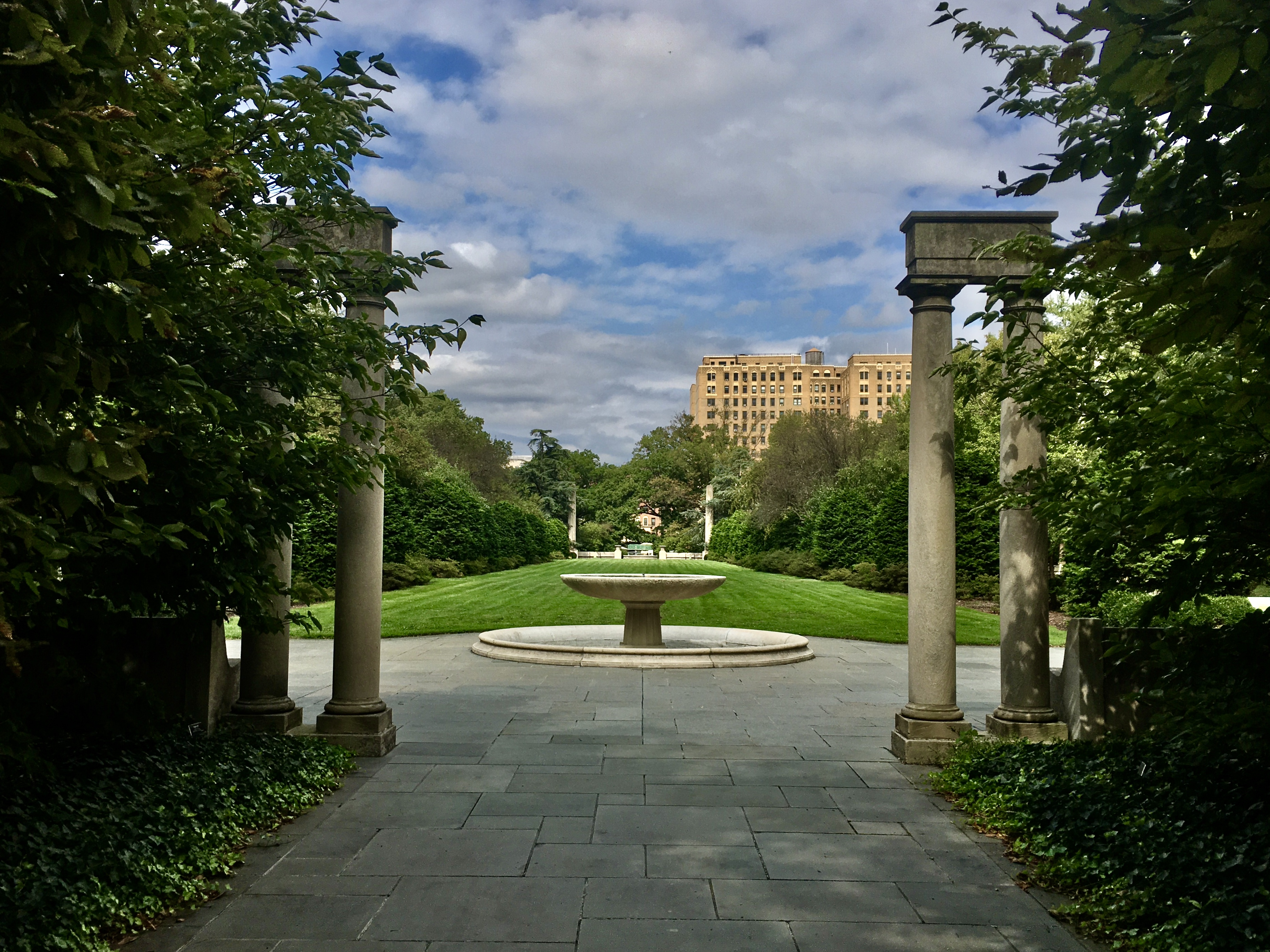
The Osborne Garden as seen from its southern end

At the extreme north end of BBG, just south of the Eastern Parkway entrance, is the Osborne Garden, a 3-acre (1.2 ha) Italian-style garden that features pergolas. The Osborne Garden also contains a memorial with four columns, a fountain, sinks, and seats. The columns are arranged in two pairs, one each at the northern and southern end. Each set of columns is fluted and is 35 feet (11 m) high, with ginkgo leaves inscribed into the pedestals of each column. There is a stone flower bed between the northern and southern pairs of columns, which originally served as a reflecting pool. The fountain is located near the southern pair of columns and is surrounded by limestone benches, which are arranged in a semicircle. The benches are nicknamed the "whispering chairs" because people sitting on the benches at either end can hear each other clearly even when whispering. A staircase at the south end of the Osborne Garden descends to the Louisa Clark Spencer Lilac Collection.

=== Native Flora Garden ===
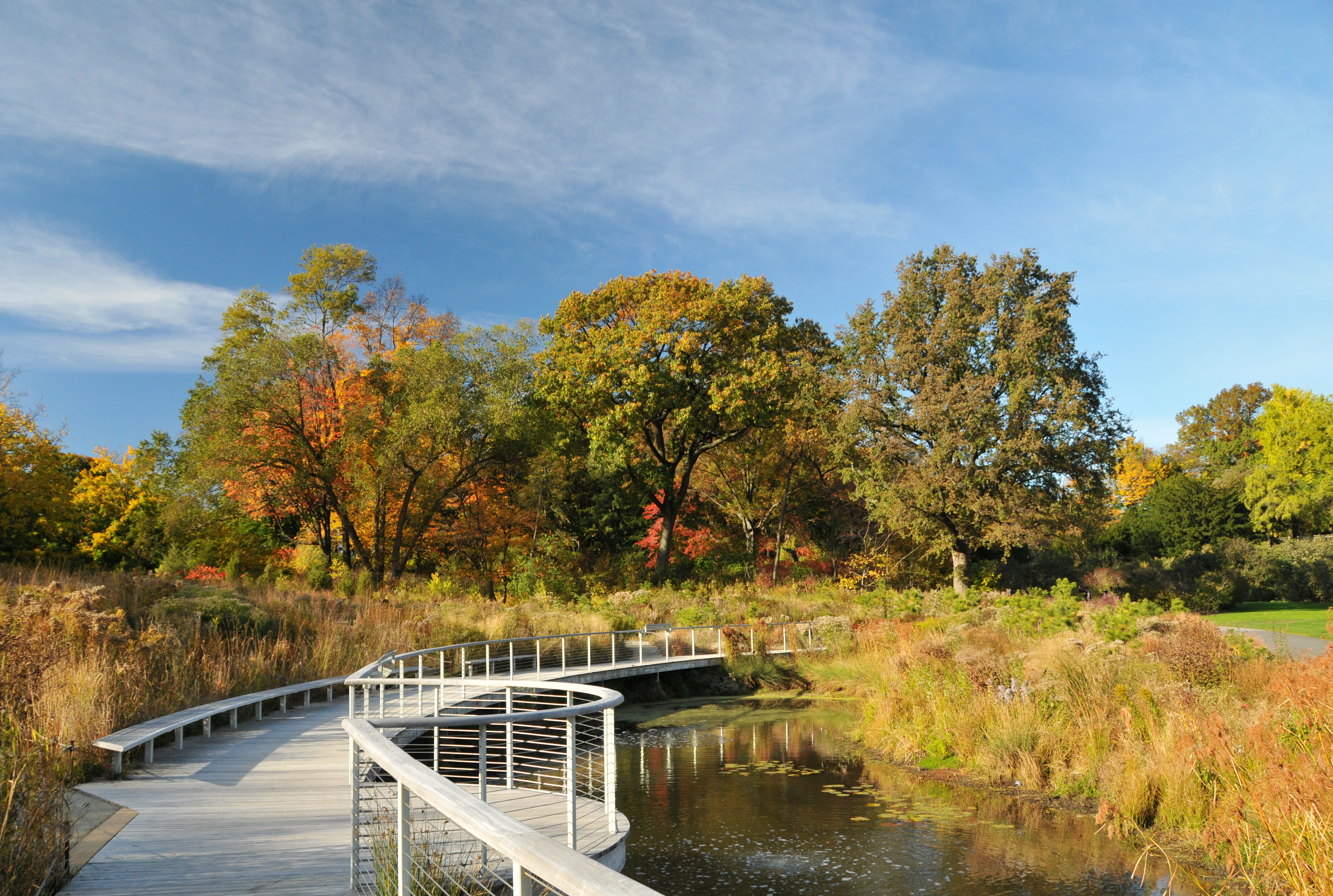
Native Flora Garden Expansion

The Native Flora Garden, formerly the Local Flora Section, is located at BBG's northwestern corner, just southwest of the Osborne Garden. It was the first of its kind in North America. It was originally a wildflower planting but was redesigned in 1931 as a woodland habitat with plants native to the New York metropolitan area. The 1931 redesign divided the Native Flora Garden into eight sections, each corresponding to a different "ecological zone". The Native Flora Garden was closed from 1963 to 1983 due to a lack of funding.

Until the 2000s, the Native Flora Garden's ecological zones consisted of a serpentine rock formation, a kettle pond with dry meadow, a bog, a limestone ledge, a pine barrens, a wet meadow, and a deciduous woodland. The garden was expanded in the late 2000s and early 2010s to provide space for local plants that were shaded out by the original garden's mature canopy. The current design, by Darrel Morrison, dates to 2013. The expansion has a tallgrass prairie, dry meadow, pine barrens, kettle pond, and a wooden bridge. There are over 15,000 specimens within the older Native Flora Garden and the expansion.

=== Cranford Rose Garden ===
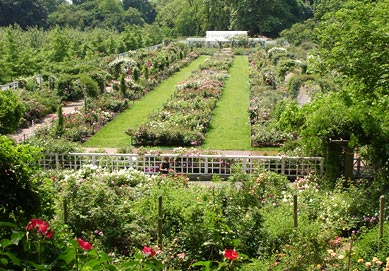
Cranford Rose Garden

The Cranford Rose Garden is in the northern section of BBG, between the Cherry Esplanade to the east and the Native Flora Garden to the west. It is named after Walter V. Cranford, a construction engineer whose firm built many of Brooklyn's subway tunnels, and who had donated $15,000 to BBG for a rose garden. The Cranford Rose Garden was designed by landscape architect Harold Caparn and BBG horticulturist Montague Free. The garden originally measured 500 by 93 feet (152 by 28 m) across and contained 15 beds with 3,000 total roses, each bed being surrounded by wooden trellis panels. The varieties of roses were originally arranged in chronological order, with older varieties to the north and newer varieties to the south. There was also a pavilion and a pergola, as well as a triangle south of the pavilion with space for historical roses.

During the late 20th century, it was the United States' third-largest rose garden that was open to the public. At the time, the Cranford Rose Garden had 5,000 bushes, representing 900 varieties. Many of the original plants were still in the garden in the early 21st century. A 2001 guidebook cited the Cranford Rose Garden as having 1,200 varieties of roses. The garden features many varieties of roses including the Knock Out rose, the Julia Child rose, and the Yellow Rose of Texas. In addition, there are numerous All-America Rose Selections, as well as roses honoring celebrities such as actors Angela Lansbury and George Burns.

=== Cherry Walk and Cherry Esplanade ===
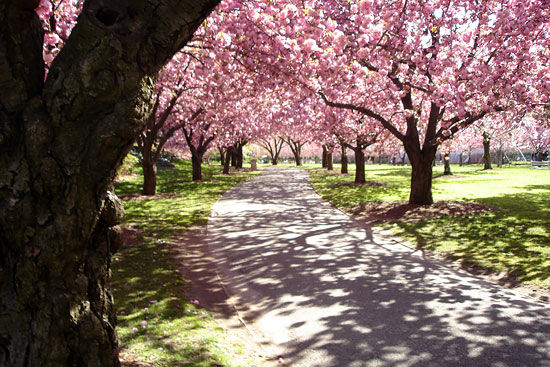
Cherry Esplanade

Brooklyn Botanic Garden has more than 200 cherry trees, representing 42 Asian species and cultivated varieties, across its Cherry Walk and Cherry Esplanade. Depending on weather conditions, the Asian flowering cherries bloom from late March or early April to mid-May, though the many species flower at slightly different times. The original cherry trees date to 1921 when BBG planted 30 trees on the Cherry Walk. The Cherry Walk connects the pond with the Cherry Esplanade in the north-central portion of BBG.

The Cherry Esplanade features two rows of tall cherry trees, as well as several rows of shorter cherry trees. There are 76 trees on the Cherry Esplanade, which represent 21 varieties. There is a 7.25-foot (2.21 m)-high limestone fountain in the Cherry Esplanade, which consists of a circular limestone bowl above a 28.5-foot-wide (8.7 m) concrete water basin. The southern end of the esplanade contains the Rose Arc Pool, consisting of three beds of roses arranged in a semicircle.

=== Japanese Hill-and-Pond Garden ===
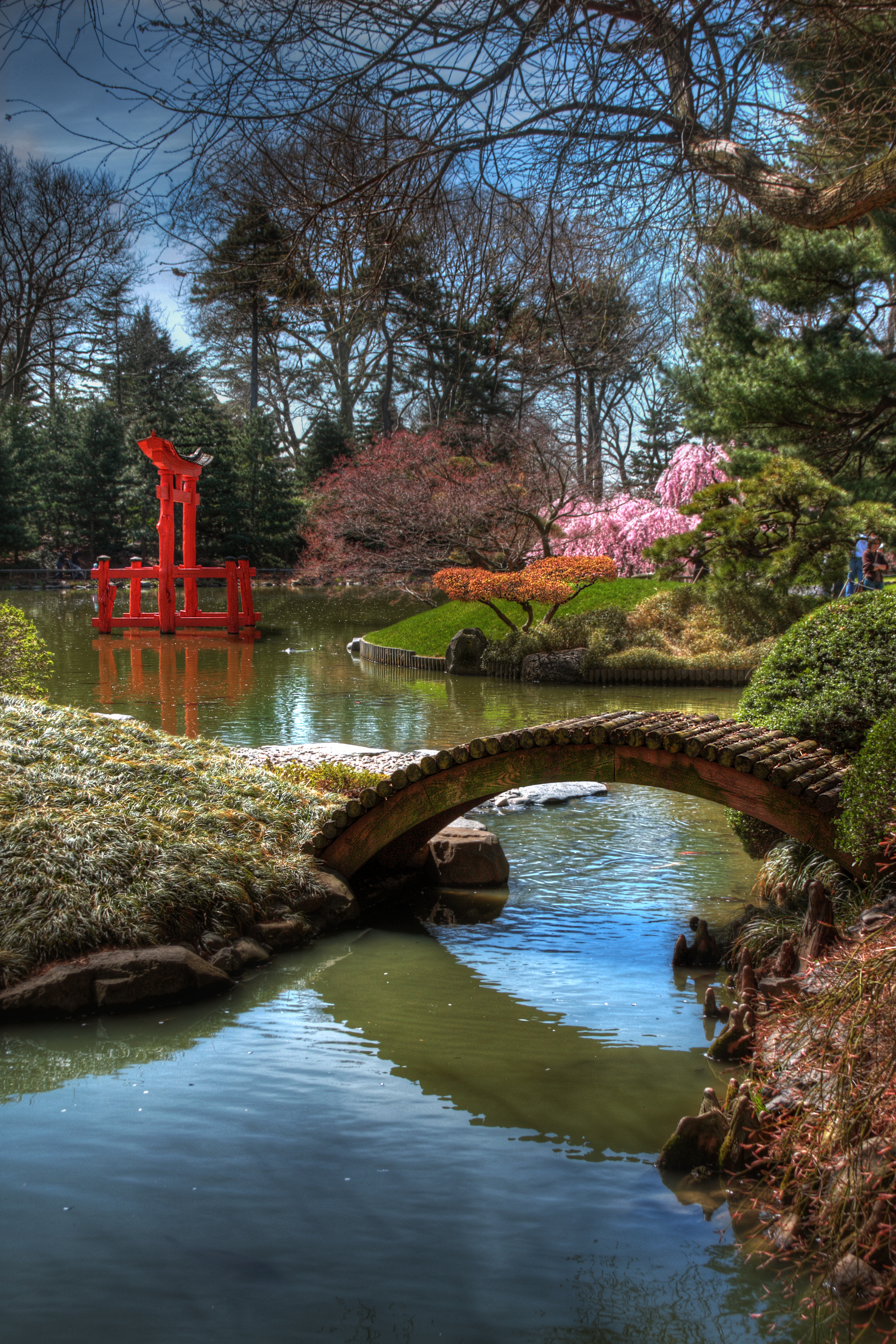
Japanese Hill-and-Pond Garden

BBG's Japanese Hill-and-Pond Garden is at the northeast corner, east of the Cherry Esplanade. It was one of the first Japanese gardens to be created in an American botanic garden, and reportedly the first one to be accessible free of charge. It was constructed for $13,000, a gift of early BBG benefactor and trustee Alfred Tredway White. The garden was created by Japanese landscape designer Takeo Shiota. Shiota never fully documented his design before his death in 1943, and various renovations over the years have modified Shiota's original plans for the Japanese Garden.

The 3-acre (1.2 ha) garden contains three man-made hills signifying earth, heaven, and humanity; an artificial waterfall and island, and rocks. The garden also contains a curved pond; although it is commonly cited as being shaped after the Chinese character for "heart", the pond predates BBG. Among the architectural elements of the garden are wooden bridges, stone lanterns, a viewing pavilion, a torii (gateway), and a Shinto shrine. The pond is filled with hundreds of Japanese koi fish that visitors can view at the torii or along the garden's trail. The center of the pond contains Turtle Island, a small rock that contains a granite lantern. There is also a Japanese temple dedicated to Inari, the fox kami. A 10-foot-high (3.0 m) shogun lantern, installed in 1980, celebrates the fact that Tokyo is a sister city of New York City. The brook from this garden leads through several other parts of Brooklyn Botanic Garden, terminating at the Water Garden.

The shrine and viewing pavilion were both rebuilt in the 1960s after burning down. The Japanese Garden was renamed the Oriental Garden during World War II and restored in 1950 following an extended wartime closure. The Japanese Garden's 2000 restoration, costing $3 million, was recognized with the New York Landmark Conservancy's 2001 Preservation Award.

=== Shakespeare Garden ===
BBG's original Shakespeare Garden was funded by a donation from Henry Clay Folger, founder of the Folger Shakespeare Library in Washington, D.C. The original garden was overshadowed by Austrian pines, so it was relocated in 1979. The modern-day Shakespeare Garden, sited just east of the Japanese Hill-and-Pond Garden, is one of two in New York City, the other being in Central Park. This English cottage garden has more than 80 plants that are mentioned in William Shakespeare's plays and poems. Plants are labeled with their common, Latin and Shakespearean names, relevant quotations, and in some cases a graphic representation of the plant. Some of the specimens in BBG's Shakespeare Garden were not mentioned in Shakespeare's work but were planted because they were suited to the climate of New York City.

=== Alice Recknagel Ireys Fragrance Garden ===
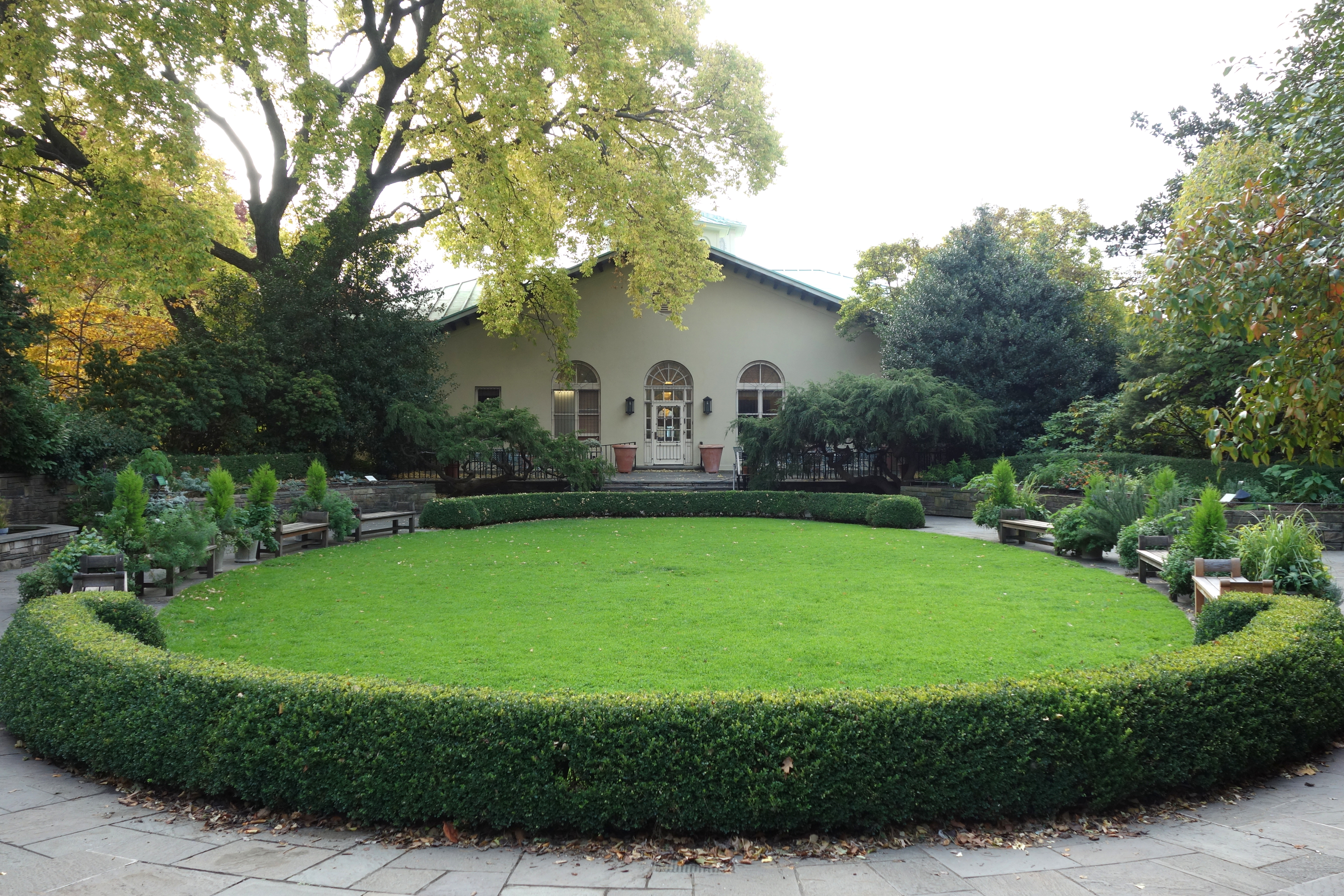
The Fragrance Garden

Next to the Shakespeare Garden, just north of the Laboratory Administration Building, is the Fragrance Garden. It was created by landscape architect Alice Recknagel Ireys. The Fragrance Garden was the first in the U.S. to be designed for the vision-impaired and has braille information signs for visitors with impaired vision. Visitors can rub the fragrant or pleasingly textured leaves of the plants between their fingers. There are four themed sections in the garden; plants to touch, plants with scented leaves, plants with fragrant flowers, and kitchen herbs. The garden is wheelchair-accessible, and all planting beds are high enough for people in wheelchairs to touch. There is also a fountain that is used as a washbasin.

=== Children's Garden ===
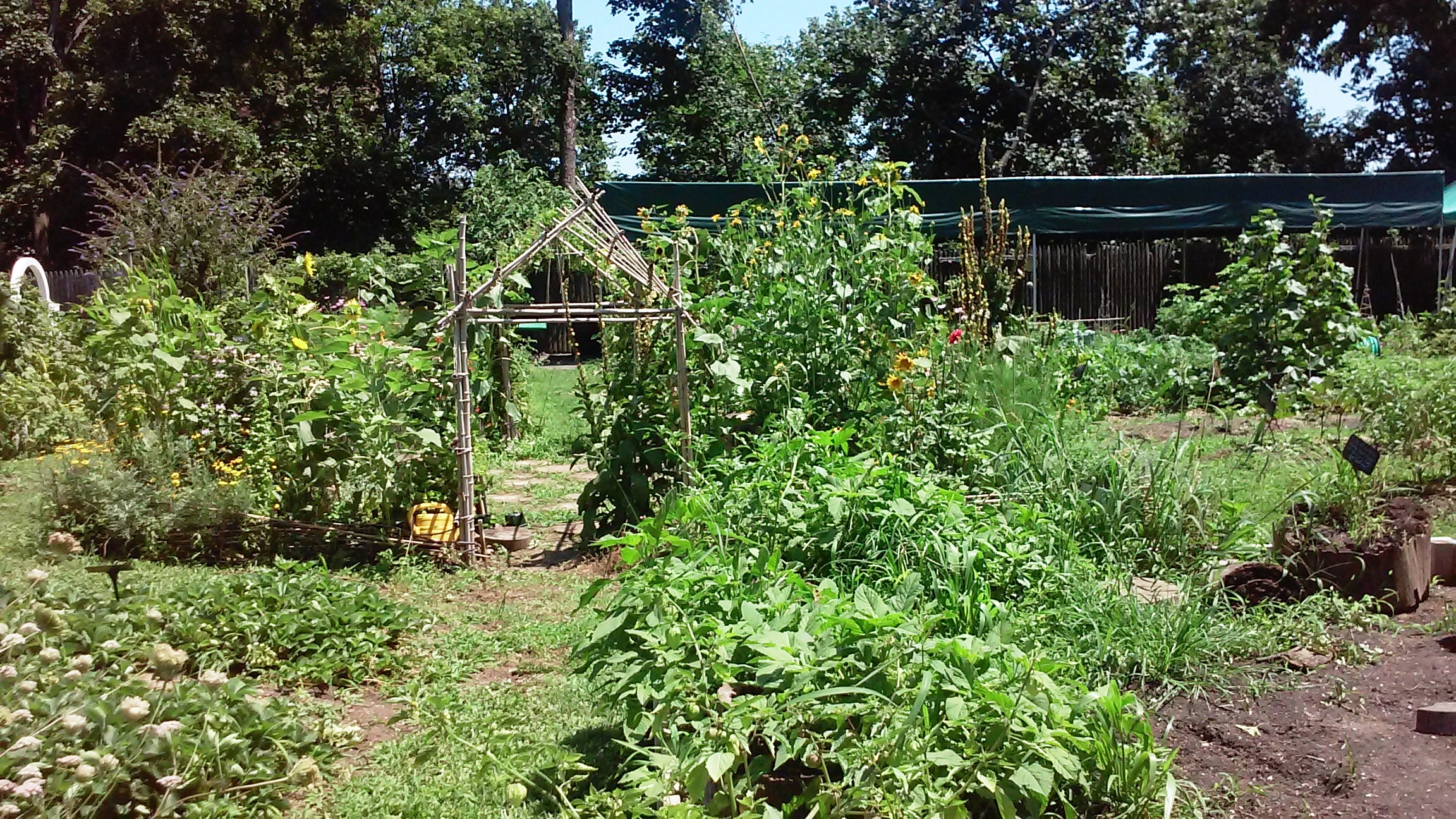
Children's Garden at Brooklyn Botanic Garden

The Children's Garden, at the southeastern corner, is one of the world's oldest children's gardens, as well as the oldest in the U.S. It was founded by BBG educator Ellen Eddy Shaw and was initially divided into plots measuring 8 by 10 ft (2.4 by 3.0 m) or 10 by 12 ft (3.0 by 3.7 m). The Children's Garden has historically taught 200 to 300 children per season. Youth grow vegetables rather than flowers. A BBG staff member quoted in 1971 said that "a variety of vegetables provides a greater range of examples of plant growth than flowers; many kinds grow quickly; and they provide a substantial and tangible reward for a child's labor".

By the 2010s, the Children's Garden attracted 1,000 youth per year. The Children's Garden continues to operate as a community garden for children and is open to Garden Apprentice Program interns and to children between 2 and 17 years of age. It also has a compost area that is maintained by interns and staff.

=== Herb Garden ===
The Herb Garden, on the western boundary, contains fruit trees, corn stalks, cabbages, and other medicinal and agricultural plants. It includes 300 herb plants, including those used to create medicines and food flavors. Interspersed with the herbs are two knot-shaped Japanese barberry and boxwood hedges. The western portion of the hedge garden is a modern adaptation of a 1577 garden designed by Thomas Hill, while the eastern portion copies Hill's original design. By 2001, the Herb Garden contained seven planting beds: six are divided by function and use, while the other planting bed is for miscellaneous herbs.

=== Discovery Garden ===
The Discovery Garden, designed for children, is at the southwest corner of BBG, next to the Flatbush Avenue entrance. It covers about 1 acre (0.40 ha) and contains 250 trees, 2,600 grass specimens, and 9,500 perennials. It is divided into three portions that contain meadows, marshes, and woodlands. The garden includes a boardwalk that winds around four large trees, in addition to several exhibits and a "hiding tree" for children.

=== Water Garden ===
Located in the south-central section of BBG, the Shelby White and Leon Levy Water Garden is a 1.5-acre (0.61 ha) wetland and riparian environment with numerous sustainability features. It contains a pond that serves as the terminus of the brook that flows from the Japanese Garden. A renovation of the Water Garden was completed in 2016. Designed by landscape architecture firm Michael Van Valkenburgh Associates, the renovated Water Garden contains plants such as black tupelo, sedges and rushes.

=== Other gardens and landscape features ===
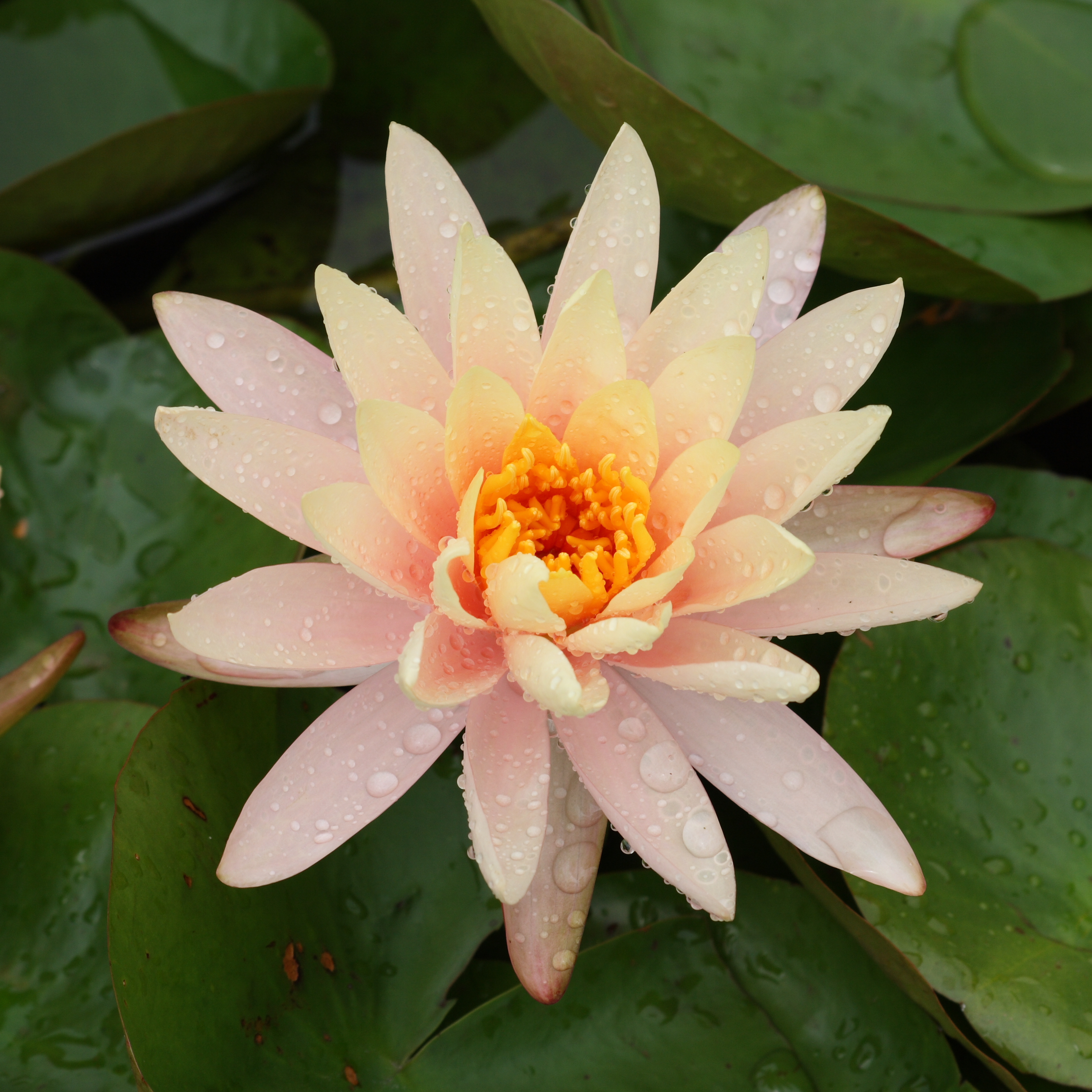
A Nymphaea 'Peach Glow' water-lily in one of the lily pools

The Lily Pool Terrace, in front of the Laboratory Administration Building to the east, has two large display pools of lilies and koi fish and is surrounded by over 6,000 annuals and perennials. Mixed perennials are planted to the east of the Lily Pool Terrace, while annuals are planted to the west. The Elizabeth Scholtz Woodland Garden, at BBG's northwest corner, contains an open-air "walled garden" surrounded by ruins which is intended to resemble a forest in the Northeastern U.S. The Louisa Clark Spencer Lilac Collection, also at the northwest corner near the Osborne Garden, contains 150 lilac bushes, which represent 20 species of lilacs. The Rock Garden, on the western boundary of BBG, contains alpine plants around 18 boulders left behind by glaciers during the Ice Age. On the western side of BBG, a bronze strip crosses a path, marking the former boundary of Brooklyn and Flatbush; a tablet marking the boundary line is mounted onto a nearby rock.

The Plant Family Collection, within the center of BBG, includes plants and trees arranged by family to show their evolution. Unlike the rest of BBG, the collection is not confined to a specific plot but is instead scattered across the botanical garden. The northern end of the collection is just south of the Japanese Hill-and-Pond Garden. From north to south, the collection contains primitive plants (ferns and conifers), ginkgos, beeches and birches, elm and pawpaw trees, laurels and roses, legumes and citruses, heath and olive families, and monocots. These are separated by a small stream.

A Celebrity Path honors famous Brooklynites such as Barbra Streisand, Woody Allen, and Walt Whitman with a trail of engraved paving stones. The Celebrity Path consists of 18-by-24-inch (460 by 610 mm) concrete blocks and leads from a hill south of the Japanese Garden to the Alfred T. White Amphitheater. Outlines of leaves surround each of the names, which are laid in bronze letters. After Marty Markowitz became Brooklyn's borough president in 2002, he stopped adding names to the path, but names are added from time to time. As of July 2024 there are 151 names. The stones of Allen, alongside Alan Dershowitz, are often requested to be removed.

BBG also has an overlook along its northern border, known as the Robert W. Wilson Overlook. The overlook was built on a hill that was created using dirt excavated from the site of the neighboring Brooklyn Museum. Originally, the hill was intended as a terrace abutting the unbuilt southern wing of the Brooklyn Museum. The modern-day overlook sits atop BBG's visitor center. The top of the overlook is 26 feet (7.9 m) above the rest of BBG. After the overlook was redesigned by Weiss/Manfredi in 2019, the hill was rebuilt with a curving 680-foot-long (210 m) path lined by retaining walls. The overlook has over 40,000 total specimens of plants.

== Structures ==
Because of the limited space available, most of Brooklyn Botanic Garden's buildings are located on the eastern edge of the site. These structures include the Steinhardt Conservatory, the Laboratory Administration Building, the Palm House, and a house for the Children's Garden.

=== Steinhardt Conservatory ===
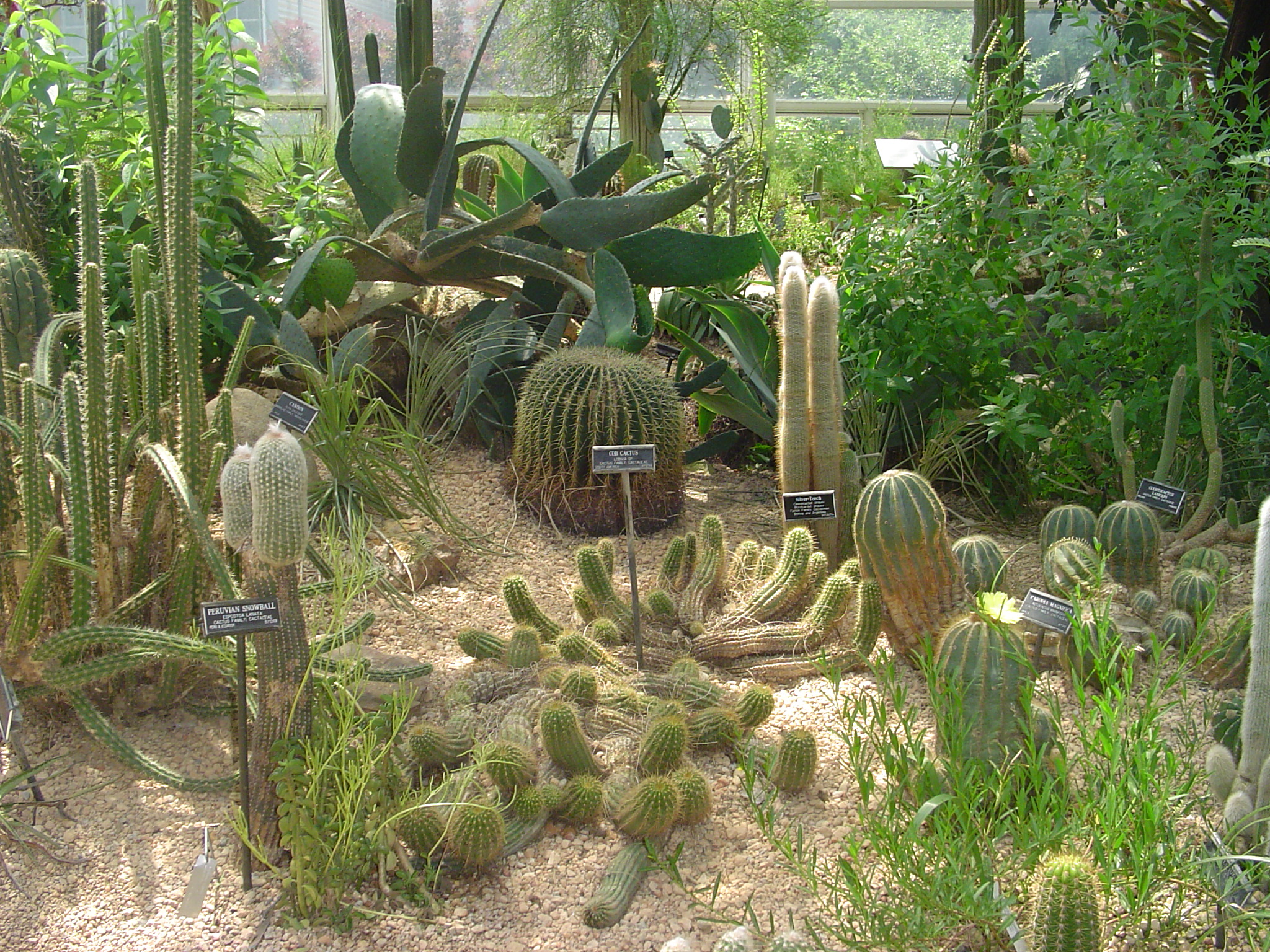
Steinhardt Conservatory desert collection

The Steinhardt Conservatory occupies the eastern portion of Brooklyn Botanic Garden, just south of the Laboratory Administration Building. The conservatory consists of four structures: a main wing along Washington Avenue to the east, as well as three octagonal pavilions. These structures, each measuring up to 60 feet (18 m) tall, cover 40,000 square feet (3,700 m^{2}) and are connected internally via tunnels. The facade of the conservatory is clad with 60,000 square feet (5,600 m^{2}) of glass panes measuring 3 by 7 feet (0.91 by 2.13 m). The metal on the exterior of the conservatory's structures is painted green to match the color of the Laboratory Administration Building's facade. The conservatory is twice the size of the Palm House, which it replaced.

The main conservatory building. measuring 245 feet (75 m) long, contains a bonsai museum, an aquatic greenhouse, and the Trail of Evolution exhibit. The lower part of the main wing has a stucco facade that is only visible from Washington Avenue, as well as a gabled entrance. The C. V. Starr Bonsai Museum hosts the second-oldest collection of bonsai in the U.S., behind Boston's Arnold Arboretum. Originally composed of 32 bonsai, the collection had grown to 400 bonsai by 2025. The museum usually displays 100 bonsai simultaneously, while the smaller bonsai are stored in a nursery above larger bonsai, out of public view. The Robert W. Wilson Aquatic House has a collections of tropical water plants, insect-eating plants, and orchids. The Trail of Evolution, named for BBG botanist Stephen K-M Tim, measures 100 by 17 feet (30.5 by 5.2 m). It traces the history of plant evolution and the effects of climate change over 3.5 billion years.

A stairway descends beneath the main structure's exterior terrace to the basements of the three octagonal pavilions. Each pavilion is accessed by a stairway leading from the basement, as well as stairways from the garden's paths. The pavilions are themed to different climates and showcase tropical, warm temperate, and desert flora. The tropical pavilion, the largest of the three pavilions at 6,000 square feet (560 m^{2}), contains tropical plants and a waterfall. The desert pavilion hosts plants from American and North African deserts and is designed to resemble a desert environment. Finally, the temperate pavilion includes Mediterranean plants. The tops of each pavilion contain cupolas with ventilation openings.

=== Laboratory Administration Building ===
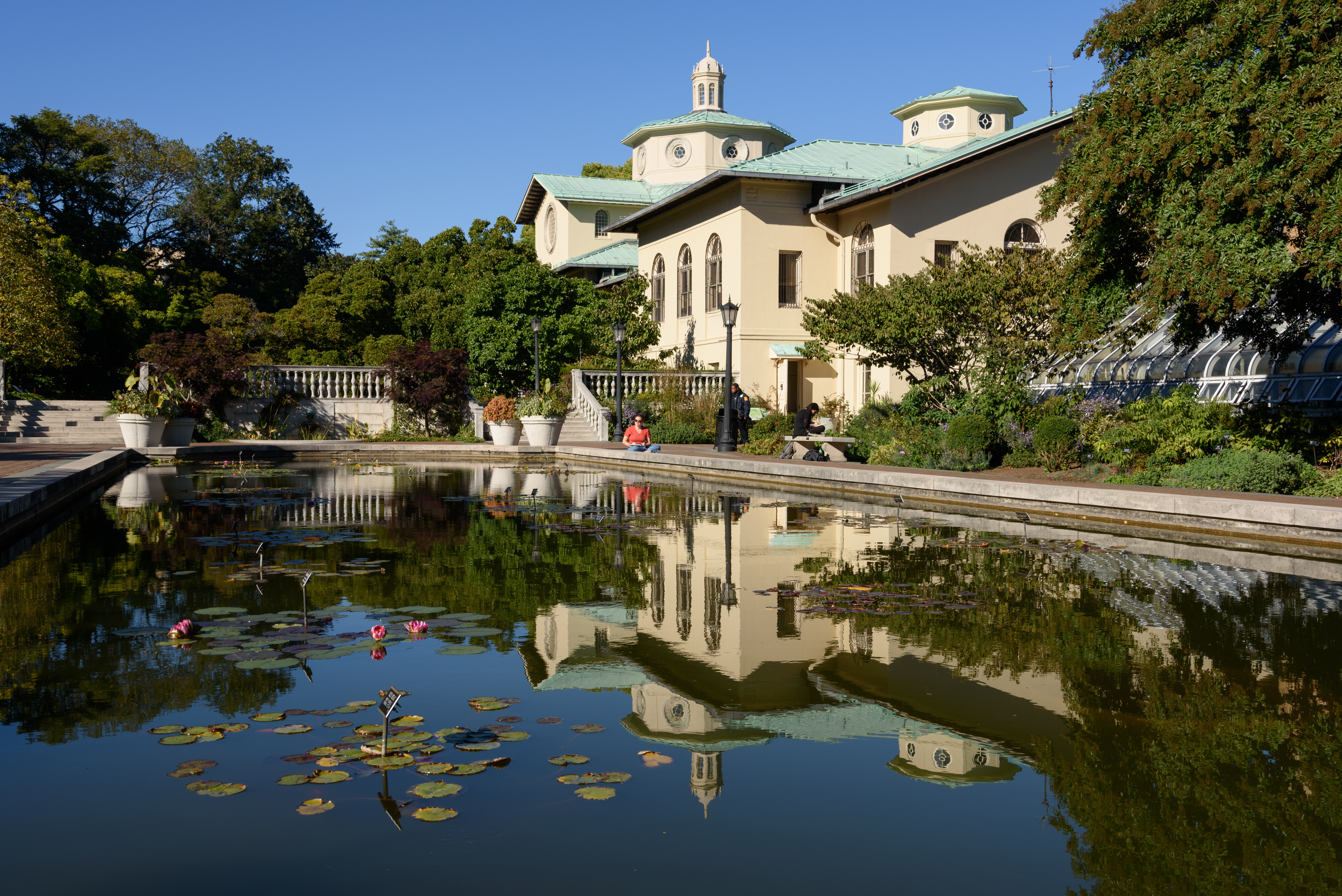
The Laboratory Administration Building

William M. Kendall of McKim, Mead & White designed the Laboratory Administration Building (also known as the Laboratory Building or Administration Building), a New York City designated landmark, in the Tuscan Revival style. The structure measures 240 by 50 feet (73 by 15 m) across and was inspired by European churches, with a Greek cross layout as viewed from the air. The center section is topped by a terracotta cupola with round-arched windows, while the outer sections are topped by octagons with round-arched windows. Outside the building is Magnolia Plaza, which contains a circular compass rose and bronze armillary sphere. Created in 1932, Magnolia Plaza was named for Judith D. Zuk in 2005.

The Laboratory Administration Building's facade is made of reinforced concrete and brick, covered with stucco. The building has hip roofs with Spanish tiles. The names of 68 famous botanists are inscribed in a frieze running across the building's facade; these names were selected through a vote in 1911. The original main entrance is on the second floor of the western facade, accessed by a staircase. The modern-day main entrance is on the first story. A portico provided a secondary entrance on Washington Avenue.

When the Administration Building was completed, it was intended to contain laboratories and storage space. The main entrance led to a rotunda, which connected with a library to the east. The northern pavilion was intended for BBG's offices, the director's laboratory, and offices for various departments. The southern pavilion was intended to contain classrooms, instructor's room, and various other laboratory rooms. The basement had service rooms and a lecture hall. By the 21st century, the Administration Building's second floor contained BBG's library, while the rest of the building was used for offices and as a visitor center.

=== Palm House ===
The Palm House was built as Brooklyn Botanic Garden's original conservatory and was designed by McKim, Mead & White. The central section of the Palm House measures 104 by 44 feet (32 by 13 m) across and 36 feet (11 m) high and was originally used for tropical plants. It is flanked by two wings each to the north and south, which each measure 50 by 22.5 feet (15.2 by 6.9 m) across. Originally, the northeast wing had classrooms, while the southwest, southeast, and northwest wings contained greenhouses; there were stables and other rooms under the southern wings. The interior of the Palm House is climate-controlled by a steam heating system.

During the 1980s, the Palm House was converted to an education center and event space, with a 300-seat restaurant. Part of the Palm House was also converted to host temporary exhibits. Since 2017, one wing of the Palm House has contained the Yellow Magnolia Café. By the 21st century, the Palm House was frequently being used for weddings, such as that of singer Art Garfunkel.

== Programs ==
=== Education programs ===
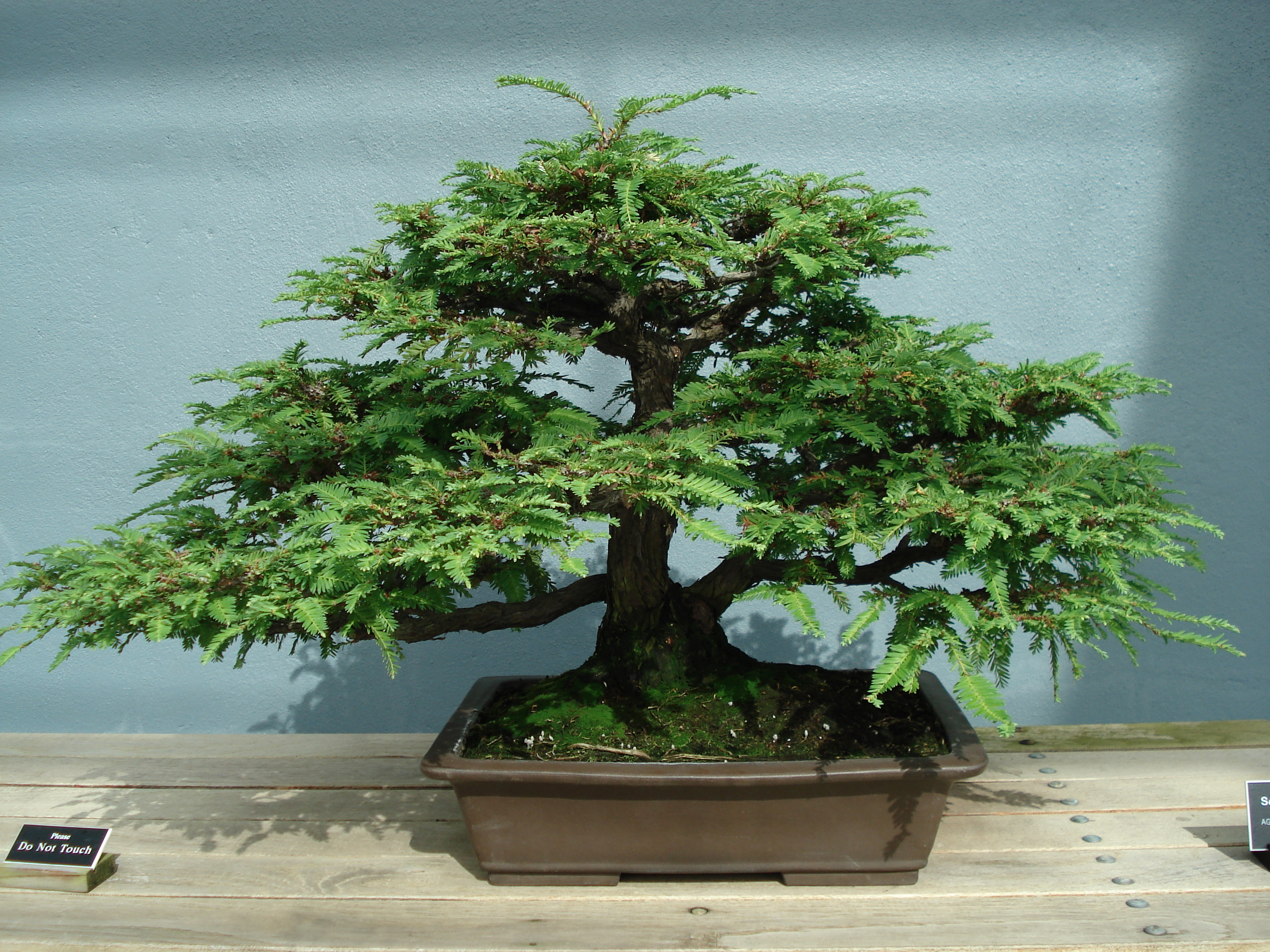
A bonsai redwood in Brooklyn Botanic Garden's Bonsai Museum

From its inception in the early 20th century, BBG offered free lectures and classes to local students. In the 21st century, BBG has continued to operate programs in youth education, conservation, and community horticulture. BBG, Prospect Park Alliance, and New York City Department of Education operate the Brooklyn Academy of Science and the Environment (BASE), a small public high school dedicated to science, environmental studies, and urban ecology.

Since 2004, BBG's Garden Apprentice Program has provided internships for students in grades 8 through 12 in gardening, science education, and environmental issues. Some of the teenagers with plots in the Children's Garden also become junior instructors for that garden. The Discovery Garden hosts weekly workshops for children, with interactive exhibits and a small plot with a variety of vegetables. Project Green Reach, launched in 1990, is a science-focused school outreach program for teachers and students in grades K–8 in underserved neighborhoods.

=== Plant science and conservation ===
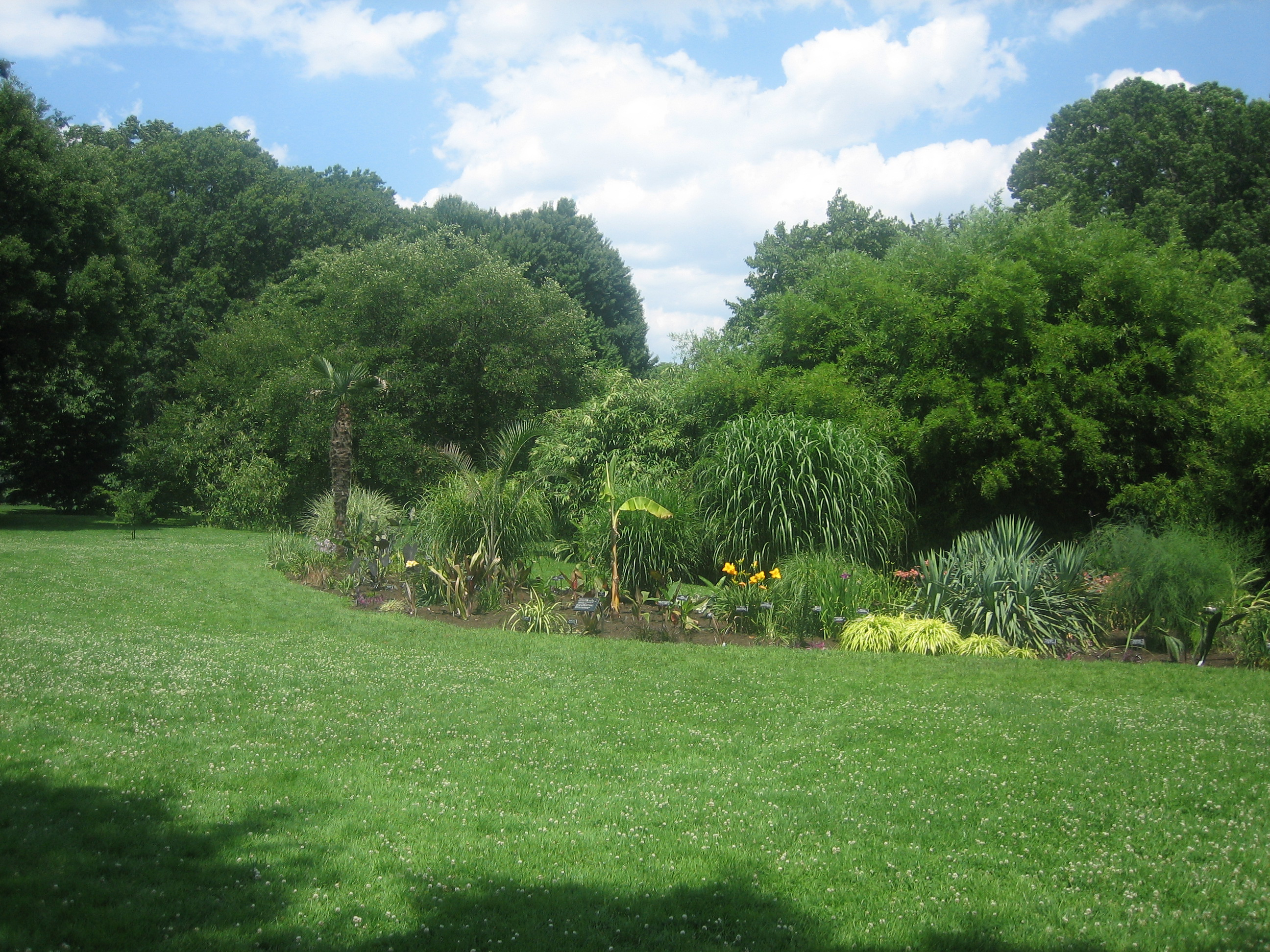
The Monocot Border in early July at Brooklyn Botanic Garden

In BBG's early years, officials hosted annual "spring inspections" for BBG members and invited guests. It also hosted events such as an annual Fall Rose Day. Scientists at Brooklyn Botanic Garden launched the New York Metropolitan Flora project, a comprehensive study of the plants of metropolitan New York City, in 1990. The study was intended to catalog and describe all vascular plants growing in the region.

BBG started creating magnolia cultivars in the 1950s. Among the species cultivated there were Magnolia × brooklynensis, three magnolia hybrid cultivars grown by BBG, as well as Magnolia 'Elizabeth', a yellow magnolia hybrid cultivar for which BBG received a patent in 1977.

The Brooklyn Botanic Garden Herbarium collection holds over 300,000 specimens representing over 1,400 species of preserved plants. These specimens, some from as early as 1818, aid scientists in tracking species, analyzing the spread of invasive plants, and modeling changes in the New York metropolitan area's vegetation. There are also holdings from the western United States, the Galapagos Islands, Bolivia, and Mauritius. The Brooklyn Botanic Garden Library, which is housed in the Laboratory Administration Building, has a collection of books on horticulture and botany that is available to home gardeners, professionals, and staff.

=== Community horticulture ===
Since 1993, Brooklyn Botanic Garden has run the Community Greening program (formerly known as Brooklyn GreenBridge), which offers residential and commercial gardening programs to block associations, community gardens, community centers, and other groups. Under the Community Greening program, BBG has run the annual Greenest Block in Brooklyn contest since 1994, which gives awards in various categories. Since 1982, BBG has hosted Making Brooklyn Bloom, an annual event with various workshops and activities. The Community Greening program also includes the Community Garden Alliance, for community gardens in Brooklyn, and the Street Tree Stewardship program, for individual trees on streets. The NYC Compost Project (formerly the Urban Composting Project), supported by the New York City Department of Sanitation, offers composting assistance and resources, as well as information on composting in residential backyards.

== Publications and resources ==
BBG began publishing a magazine, the Record, in February 1912; members received the publication for free. BBG's director C. Stuart Gager was editor of the Record until his death in 1943. The last edition of the Record was published in 1944. BBG launched a series of gardening handbooks in 1945; the first volume in the series was Lilies and Their Culture: Use in the Garden. Brooklyn Botanic Garden's Guides to a Greener Planet contain information on garden design, sustainability, and native plants. In addition, the botanical garden has published reference books such as the Brooklyn Botanic Garden Gardener's Desk Reference (1998).

BBG launched its website in 1996. The website includes events, classes, and information on its gardens and collections, as well as a blog and practical gardening advice. BBG's collection of historic photographs and lantern slides is also available online. The website includes an interactive map named CherryWatch, which tracks whether each cherry blossom tree has bloomed during the spring. The Laboratory Administration Building has a Gardener's Resource Center that provides reference services.

== Former BBG properties ==
BBG formerly operated three other sites in the New York metropolitan area. The first to open was a 223-acre (90 ha) research facility at Kitchawan Preserve in Westchester County, on land that it purchased from Elizabeth Van Brunt in 1956. Yorktown, New York, officials approved the research center in early 1959; the complex included a double-level laboratory near an abandoned railroad station on the New York and Putnam Railroad. After the research center opened in 1960, it was described as "the most important single development since the founding of the Botanic Garden 50 years ago". The research center was originally known as the Kitchawan Research Laboratory. A herb garden and perennial border garden were dedicated at Kitchawan in 1981, and the research center was renamed the Brooklyn Botanic Garden Research Center in 1982. BBG sold off most of Kitchawan to the Westchester County government in 1988.

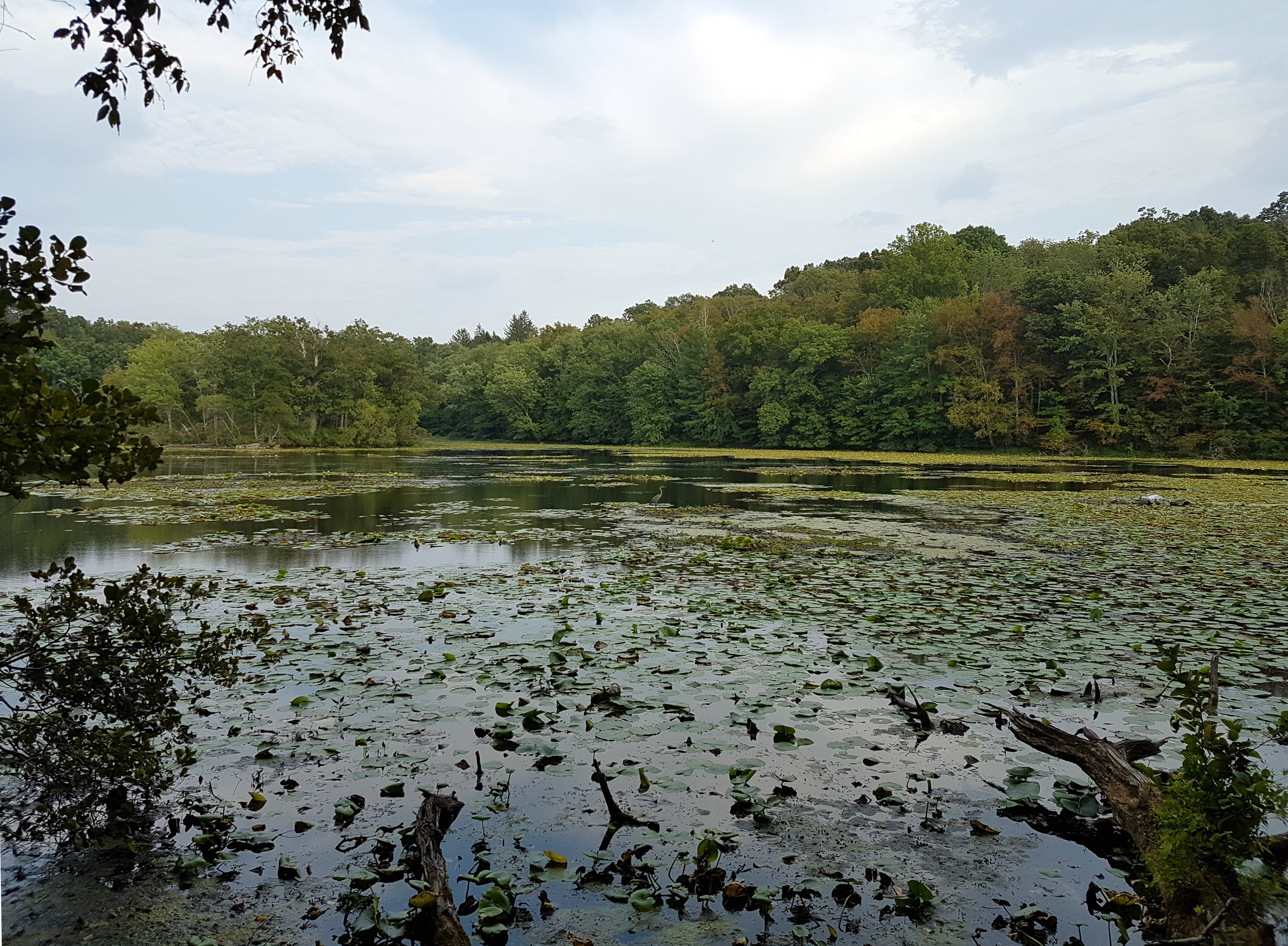
BBG co-produced programming at the Teatown Lake Reservation until 1980.

A second property in Westchester County, the Teatown Lake Reservation, was established in 1963, a year after Gerard Swope Sr. bequeathed 250 acres (1.0 km^{2}) to BBG. Over the years, the reservation grew through additional bequests. BBG and Teatown staff co-produced programming at the reservation until 1980, when Teatown began leasing the land from BBG, and the Teatown Lake Reservation became a legally separate entity in 1984. BBG continued to own a 245-acre (99 ha) portion of the Teatown Lake Reservation until May 2018. BBG retains a conservation easement on the Teatown site.

The lawyer Grenville Clark donated the 12-acre (4.9 ha) Clark Botanic Garden in Albertson, on Long Island, to BBG in 1966. BBG's Fanny Dwight Clark Memorial Garden opened on the site in 1969, and BBG used the Clark Botanic Garden as an outreach station, with instructors from the Brooklyn Museum. The Clark Botanic Garden had three small lakes, as well as a children's garden and a rock garden, which were similar to those in the original BBG. Although the Clark Botanic Garden was operated by BBG, the two gardens were legally separate entities, and the Clark Garden charged admission, whereas the original garden did not. The North Hempstead town government acquired Clark Botanic Garden from BBG in 1989.

== Membership, events, and operations ==
As of 2023, BBG membership starts at $75 for individuals. Members can attend events in the spring and summer months, including themed sunset picnic nights. Each spring, a month-long cherry blossom viewing festival called Hanami is held at the Cherry Esplanade. This culminates in a weekend celebration called Sakura Matsuri, which was first hosted in the 1980s, although this event has not been held since the COVID-19 pandemic. Other events include the Chile Pepper Festival, which has been held annually since the 1990s, and Lightscape, a light art show that is hosted at the end of each year.

As of 2019, BBG had an annual operating budget of $23 million. BBG recorded $20,869,967 in revenue and $20,988,655 in expenses for fiscal year 2020, meaning its net income was negative $118,688. BBG had more than 800,000 annual visitors as of 2015.

== See also ==
- List of botanical gardens in the United States
- List of museums and cultural institutions in New York City
