= Project Green Reach =

A Plant Investigator observes plant cells under a compound microscope

Project Green Reach (PGR) is a science-focused school outreach program for teachers and students that is designed specifically to work with Brooklyn's Title I schools. It is an entity within the education department at the Brooklyn Botanic Garden, which is a world-renowned botanical garden located in Brooklyn, New York. PGR is estimated to reach 2,500 students annually in Brooklyn's most under-served neighborhoods. Funding for PGR comes mostly from private grants. This allows the programs that operate under the auspices of PGR to be very inexpensive and accessible.

== School year programming ==
During the school year, Project Green Reach instructors partner with classroom teachers in Brooklyn's Title I schools. During the course of the school year, PGR works with 80 classes of students, grades kindergarten through eighth grade. Each class of PGR participants has three sessions with PGR: one school visit in which the students participate in a botanically oriented workshop during which each student gets their own plant to keep for ongoing study, one visit to the garden in which the students explore the plants that are on display and participate in some hands-on activities in the greenhouses, and a final, culminating, school visit in which the students perform a horticulture-based community service project. In addition, PGR runs two more professional development workshops for the participating teachers.

Currently, PGR offers four curricula for their classroom visit workshops: life cycle of a bulb, kitchen botany, desert environments, and the tropical rainforest.

== Summer program ==
Project Green Reach plots in the Children's Garden

At the end of the school year, participating teachers of grades 4, 5 and 6 are asked to nominate one or two students who reacted positively to the classroom visit, the tour of the Garden, and/or the ongoing investigation with plants in their classroom to apply for PGR's summer program. One other important qualification for admission to the program is that the student should have little or no other summer programming options. Candidates for the summer program are nominated by their teachers, and go through an application and interview process before being accepted into the program.

The accepted applicants then participate in Project Green Reach's six-week summer program, which is divided into two smaller subsections: the Junior Botanist program, and the Plant Investigator program. First-time students are automatically placed into the Junior Botanist program, which is specifically designed for children who have little or no horticultural or botanical experience. Junior Botanists are then given the opportunity to reapply and become Plant Investigators for a second summer. Since Plant Investigators have some prior experience, their curriculum is usually more focused on life sciences. Junior Botanists and Plant investigators spend the morning together, typically working on their plots in the Children's Garden, and have separate lessons after lunch.

== History ==
Project Green Reach began in 1989.

== See also ==
- List of botanical gardens in the United States
- List of museums and cultural institutions in New York City
