= Elizabeth Scholtz =

South African - American plantswoman and botanic garden director

- Born: 29 April 1921; Pretoria, South Africa
- Died: 22 April 2020 (aged 98); Brooklyn, New York, U.S.
- Education: University of Witwatersrand
- Known for: Director, Brooklyn Botanic Garden

Elizabeth Scholtz (1922 - 2020) was a plantswoman and director of the Brooklyn Botanic Garden from 1972 to 1980.

== Personal life and education ==
Scholtz was born 29 April 1921. Her father was a medical doctor but died in 1932 and her mother later remarried. Scholtz studied at the University of Witwatersrand and graduated with BS degree in botany and zoology, specialising in bushveldt trees. She wanted to go on to postgraduate study but her family could not afford this.

She died 22 April 2020.

== Career ==
She was the first woman director of a major urban botanical garden in the USA, after starting her career with medical research in South Africa. Following her degree, she studied medical technology and was employed at a laboratory in Groote Schuur Hospital in Cape Town, South Africa and became involved in medical research for two decades. She continued her interest in plants in spare time. She met and ate with Louis Leipoldt. In 1957 she took a fellowship in hematology at Beth Israel Hospital in Boston, Massachusetts in the USA. While there she met George Avery, director of Brooklyn Botanic Garden, and he later offered her a post.

In November 1960 she was appointed to head the Adult Education department at the Brooklyn Botanic Garden and attracted more students during her tenure. She became the garden's director in 1972. At that time the gardens consisted of four properties: 52-acre botanic garden in Brooklyn, 223-acre Kitchawan Research Station, 400-acre Teatown Lake Reservation, in Ossining, New York, 12-acre Clark Botanic Garden, in Albertson, New York.

She stepped down as director in 1980 and officially retired in 1987, but remaining active as emeritus director until 2019. In 1994 she was a founder board member of the American Society of Botanical Artists.

As director emeritus she led more than 100 international botanical tours abroad, visiting 46 countries. She also gave many public outreach lectures.

== Awards ==
In 1981 Swarthmore College gave her the Arthur Hoyt Scott Garden and Horticulture Medal. She was awarded the Liberty Hyde Bailey Medal from the American Horticultural Society in 1984, the gold Veitch Memorial Medal of the Royal Horticultural Society in 1990, and made an Honorary Life Member by the American Public Gardens Association in 2008. She was awarded honorary degrees by Pace University and Long Island University. She was a member of the board or committee of several other botanic gardens.

== Legacy ==
The Elizabeth Scholtz Woodland Garden within the Brooklyn Botanic Garden was opened in 2019.

== Publications ==
Scholtz was an author or co-author of several publications and films. These included:

- Dye Plants and Dyeing, 1964
- The film Nature’s Colors: the Craft of Dyeing with Plants
