= Alfred Tredway White Memorial =

Sculpture in Brooklyn, New York, U.S.

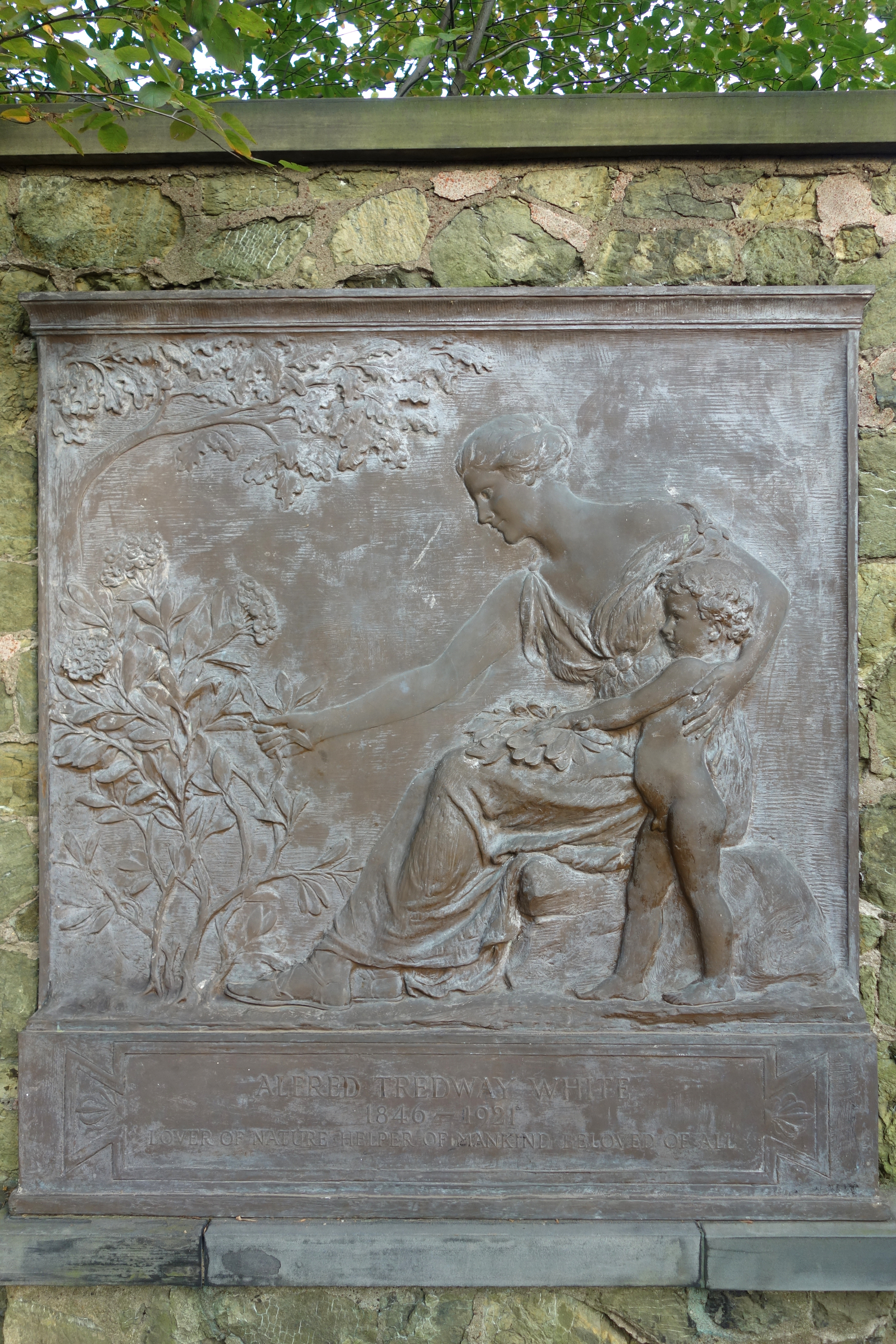
- Artist: Daniel Chester French
- Year: 1923 (original); 1990 (replacement)
- Subject: Mother Nature
- Location: New York City
- 40°40′4.74″N 73°57′47.4″W

The Alfred Tredway White Memorial is a memorial by American sculptor Daniel Chester French dedicated to Alfred Tredway White. It is located in the Brooklyn Botanic Garden, in the U.S. state of New York. White was an early benefactor of the Brooklyn Botanic Garden.

== Description ==
The sculpture allegorically depicts White's association with the Botanic Garden with a bas-relief of Mother Nature removing branches from a laurel bush to make a wreath. In addition to his name and years, engraved are the words, "Lover of Nature · Helper of Mankind · Beloved of All".

The monument was dedicated on June 7, 1923, but the original stele by architect Henry Bacon was destroyed and the original moved to the Botanic Garden auditorium. A replacement was erected in 1990.

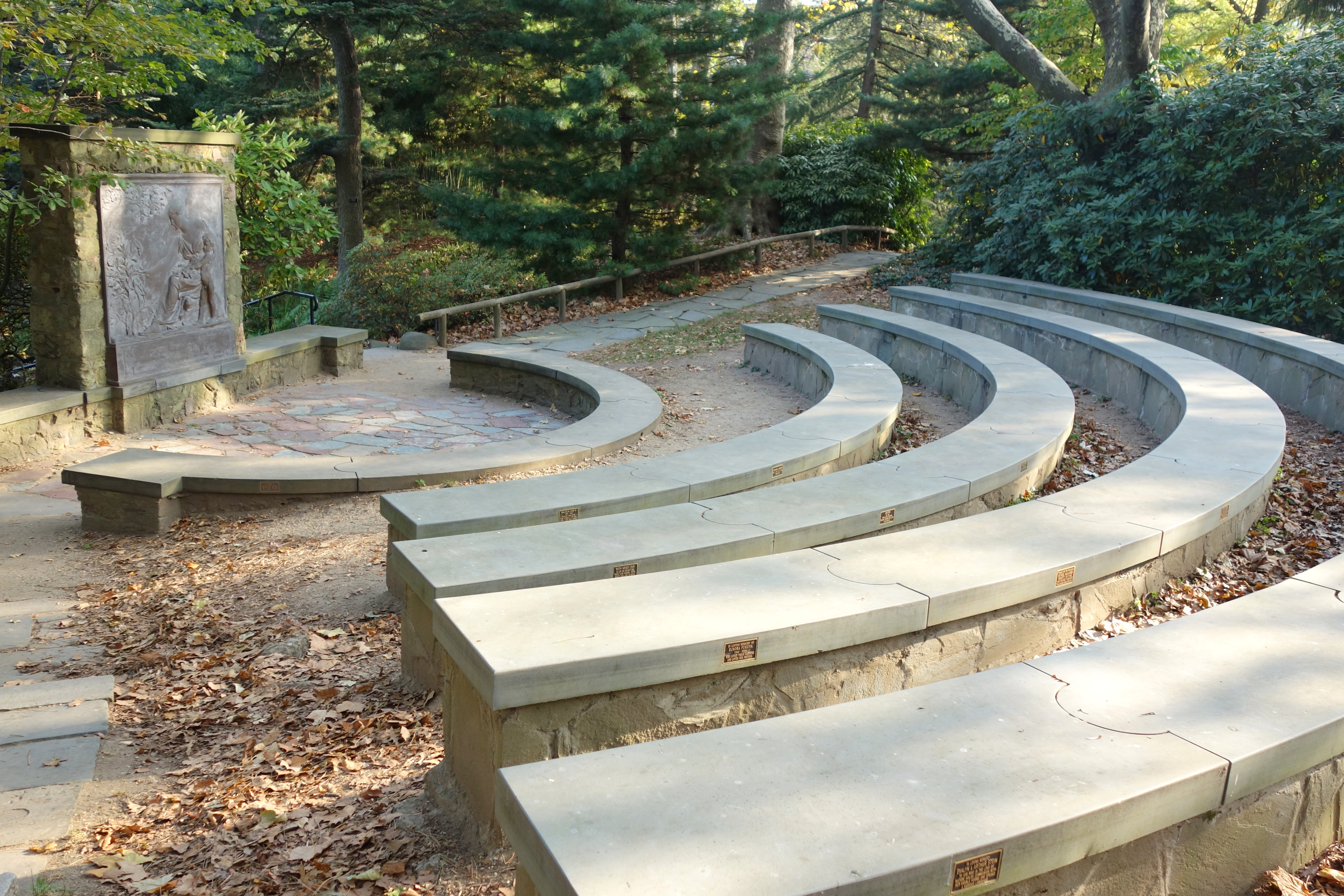
Memorial and amphitheater, 2013

== See also ==
- Public sculptures by Daniel Chester French
