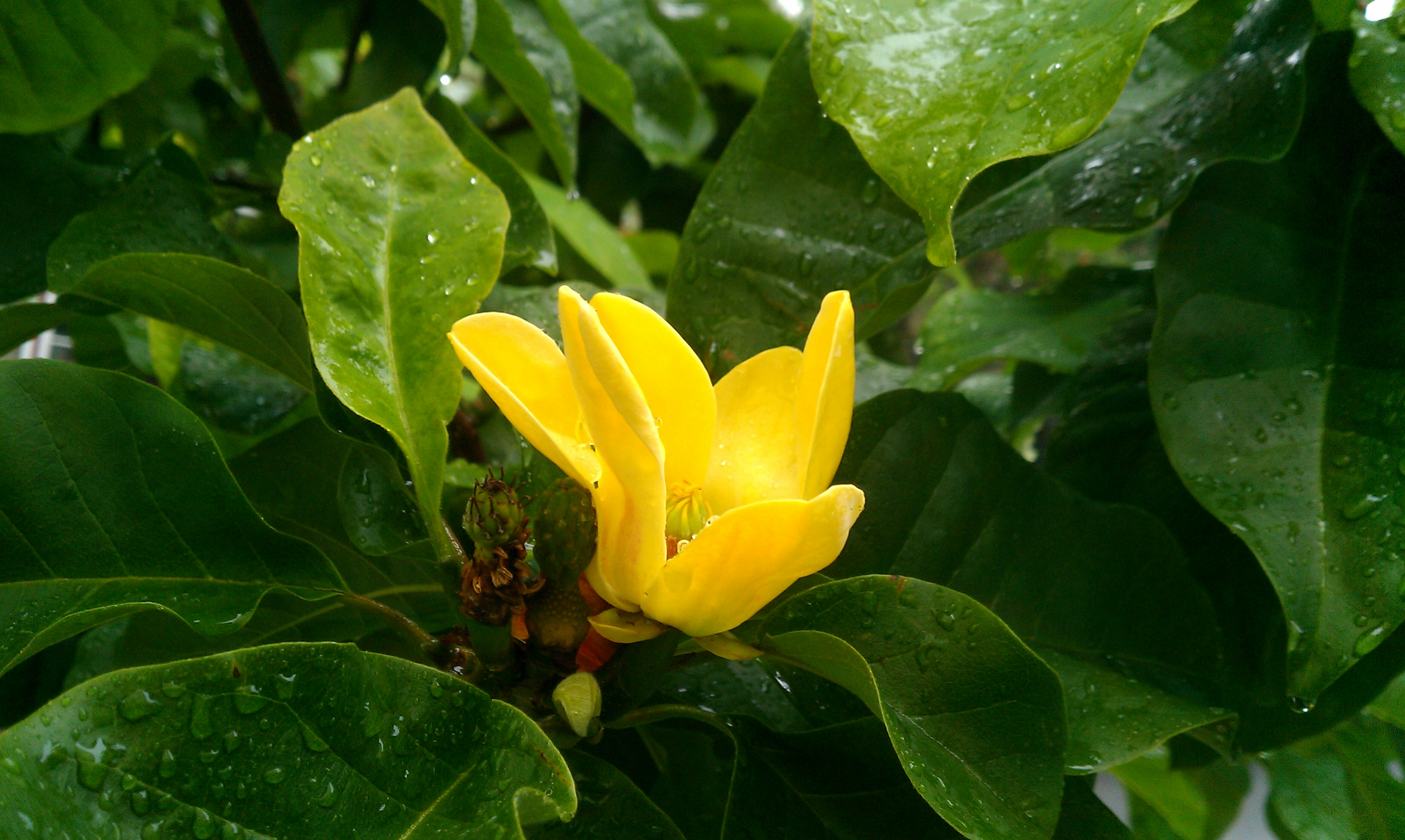
- Magnolia × brooklynensis 'Yellow Bird'

Scientific classification
- Kingdom: Plantae
- Clade: Tracheophytes
- Clade: Angiosperms
- Clade: Magnoliids
- Order: Magnoliales
- Family: Magnoliaceae
- Genus: Magnolia
- Species: M. × brooklynensis

Binomial name
- Magnolia × brooklynensis Kalmb.

= Magnolia × brooklynensis =

Species of tree

Magnolia × brooklynensis is a hybrid Magnolia that is the result of a cross between Magnolia acuminata (cucumbertree) and Magnolia liliiflora (Mulan magnolia). It was developed in a breeding program at the Brooklyn Botanic Garden beginning in 1953 to create yellow-flowered varieties.

A number of cultivars of Magnolia × brooklynensis are commercially available, including 'Evamaria', 'Hattie Carthan', and 'Yellow Bird' (the result of a back-cross with 'Evamaria' and M. acuminata var. subcordata). 'Evamaria' has purplish flowers with touches of orange, yellow or green. 'Hattie Carthan' has yellow flowers with a blush of red-purple veins, and 'Yellow Bird' has deep yellow petals.

The Brooklyn Botanic Garden also created the 'Elizabeth' cultivar, which is often incorrectly lumped in with M. × brooklynensis in the lay gardening literature, by crossing Magnolia acuminata with Magnolia denudata. The cream to pale yellow flowered Magnolia 'Elizabeth' has gained the Royal Horticultural Society's Award of Garden Merit.
