= Judith D. Zuk =

American horticulturist, author and conservationist

Judith Daria Zuk (September 11, 1951 – September 1, 2007) was an American horticulturist, author and conservationist who served as president of the Brooklyn Botanic Garden from 1990 to 2005.

== Biography ==
A native of Canandaigua, New York, Zuk attended Rutgers University, graduating summa cum laude with a degree in botany. Following graduate studies at the University of Delaware, she received a master's degree in public garden administration. After graduating, Zuk had the opportunity to study landscape design abroad, in England, after receiving a Garden Club of America fellowship. Prior to accepting the Brooklyn position, she held the post of director of Swarthmore College's Scott Arboretum.

The Brooklyn Botanic Garden, founded in 1910, was commemorating its 80th anniversary as Judith Zuk assumed the directorship. Considered one of America's leading institutions of its type, the Garden had just undergone a spate of construction work designed to expand its building area. The space dedicated to nature, however, was still in need of renovation. In the months and years to come, Zuk proved to be a tireless fundraiser, bringing in millions of dollars to refurbish such areas as the fragrance garden, the Cranford rose garden, the Japanese hill-and-pond garden and the children's garden.

She was also an ardent conservationist and environmentalist, representing the United States at the Botanic Gardens Conservation International, a worldwide organization created to ensure the survival of plants facing extinction. Another of her projects was a new high school dedicated to environmental issues, which she realized with the help of the administration of adjoining Prospect Park and The New York City Department of Education.

== Later years ==
Upon her retirement in mid-2005, she was honored with the renaming of the Garden's magnolia plaza as well as a golden yellow variety of magnolia, developed at the Garden, to be known as "Judy Zuk". Judith Zuk died in Brooklyn of breast cancer in 2007, ten days before her 56th birthday. Zuk had lived for many years in Park Slope.
