= Ellen Eddy Shaw =

American writer (1874–1960)

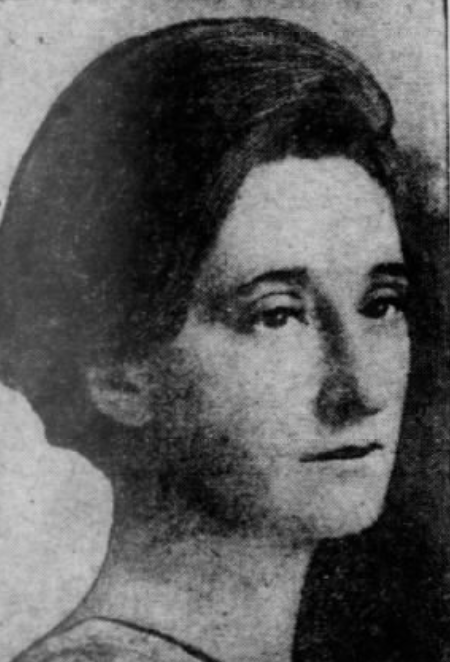
- Shaw from a 1925 newspaper
- Born: April 1, 1874; Woburn, Massachusetts, U.S.
- Died: December 20, 1960 (aged 86); Taunton, Massachusetts, U.S.
- Other names: Ellen E. Shaw
- Occupations: Writer, editor, teacher

Ellen Eddy Shaw (April 1, 1874 – December 20, 1960) was an American writer, editor, and teacher on gardening and farming. From 1913 to 1945, she was Curator of Elementary Instruction at the Brooklyn Botanic Garden.

== Early life ==
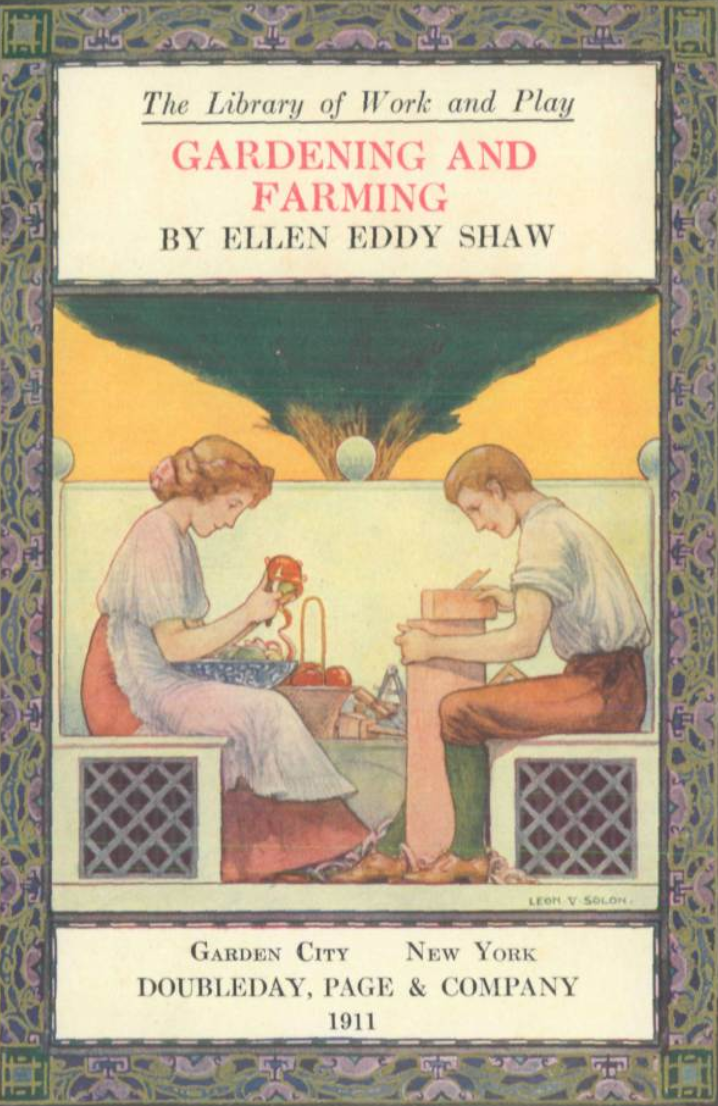
The cover of Ellen Eddy Shaw, Gardening and Farming (1911), with illustration by Léon-Victor Solon

Shaw was born in Woburn, Massachusetts, the daughter of Marcus Morton Shaw and Jane Elizabeth Cobb Shaw. She graduated from Woburn High School in 1893, and earned a bachelor's degree from Tufts College and began medical school there, before she left to care for her ailing father, and began a teaching career instead.

== Career ==
Shaw taught school as a young woman, and supervised the nature study program at the Ethical Culture School in New York. She edited the children's page of Garden magazine, and the nature department of Country Life in America. She wrote The Library of Work and Play: Gardening and Farming (1911), and Garden Flowers of Spring, Summer, and Autumn (1917, 3 volumes). She was managing editor of the magazine of the National Plant, Flower, and Fruit Guild. She was president of the American Nature Study Society in 1939 and 1940, vice president of the National Council of Garden Teachers, and secretary of the School Garden Association of America.

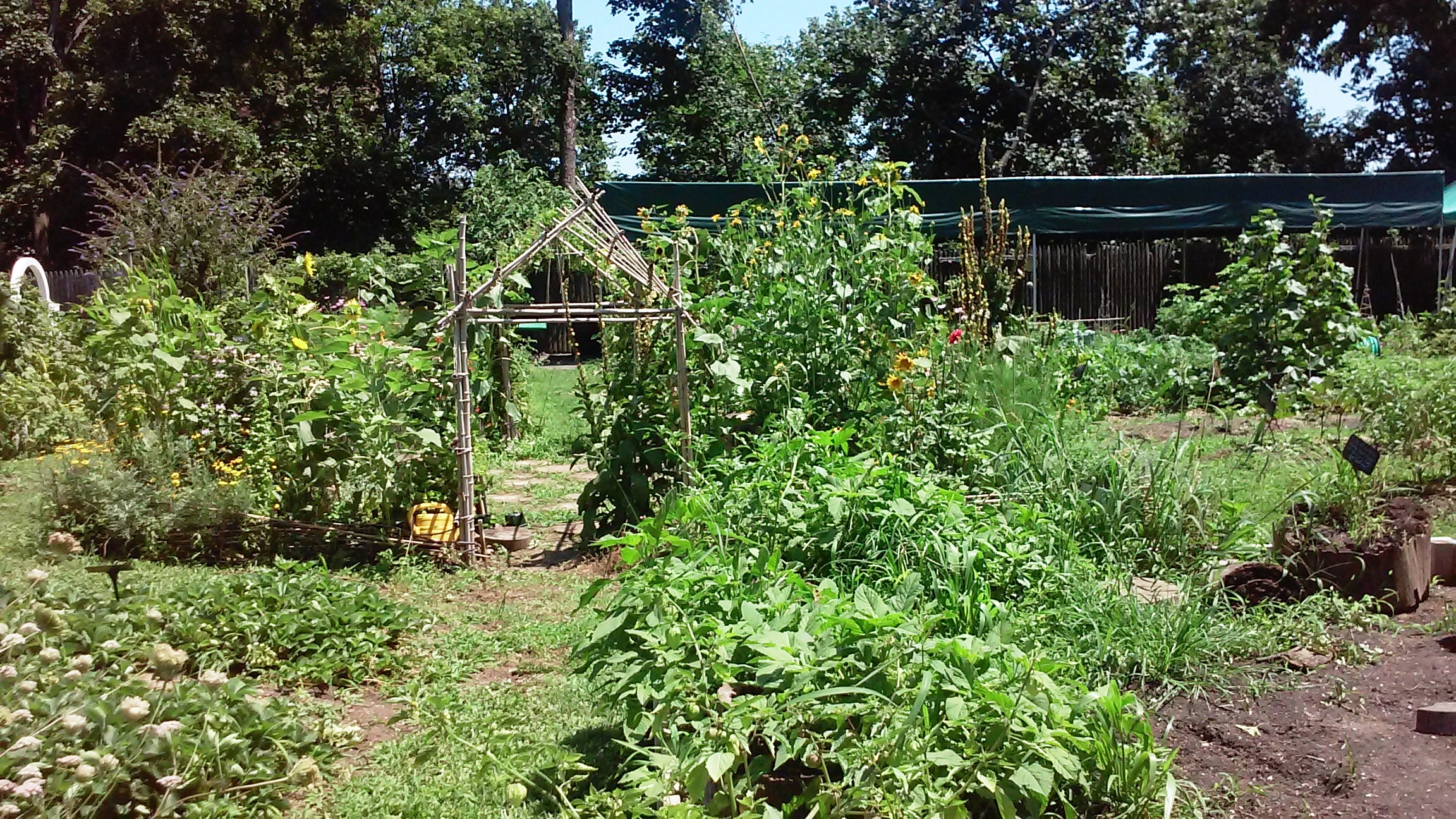
The Children's Garden at Brooklyn Botanic Garden

Shaw was Curator of Elementary Instruction at the Brooklyn Botanic Garden from 1913 until she retired in 1945. Under her guidance, over half a million city children were exposed to gardening and nature study. She gave nature programs, taught workshops, raised funds, held events, and wrote about the garden's work in national publications. She lectured about her work in England in 1931, and in Amsterdam in 1935. She ran the BBG Children's Garden Club, providing scaled-down garden tools and incentives (including scholarship money, medals and badges), for children who created rooftop gardens, raised vegetables, and identified flower specimens, among other achievements. She encouraged older children to recruit younger children into gardening tasks, and rewarded acts of responsibility and cooperation. "Children are my job," she explained in 1925, "and what I try to teach them here primarily is not gardening, but I strive to make of them better men and women I try to show them, through the solving of problems here, how to learn life's lessons."

Shaw retired in September 1945 and the Brooklyn Botanic Garden established the Ellen Eddy Shaw Fellowship to honor her contributions. The first recipient of that fellowship was Elizabeth Hess.

== Personal life ==
Shaw died in 1960, aged 86 years, in Taunton, Massachusetts. Shaw's Children's Garden remains as an educational program of the Brooklyn Botanic Garden.
