= C. Stuart Gager =

American botanist (1872–1943)

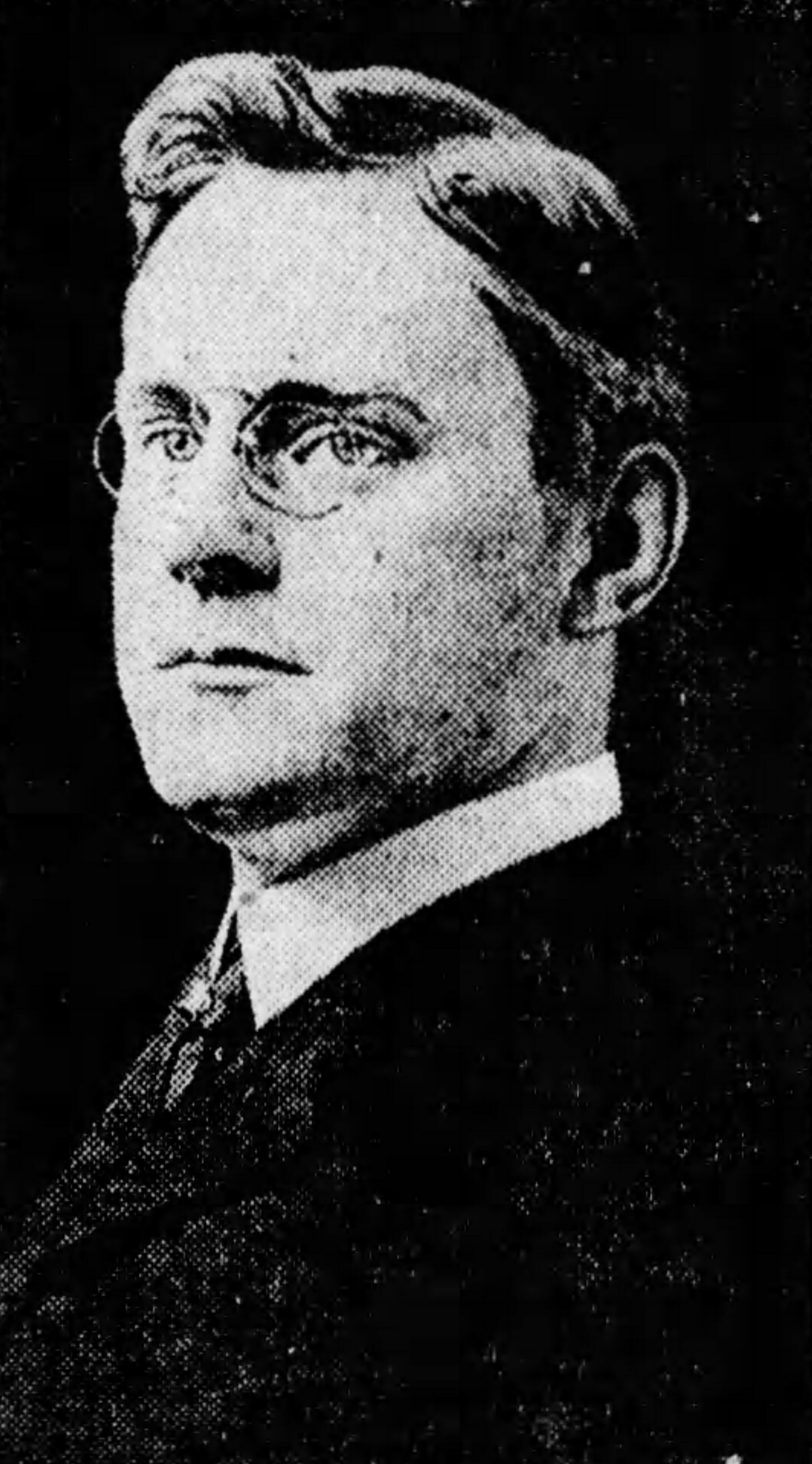
C. Stuart Gager

Charles Stuart Gager (December 23, 1872 – August 9, 1943) was an American botanist who served as director of the Brooklyn Botanic Garden for over 30 years. He served as president of the Botanical Society of America and the Torrey Botanical Club. Born in Norwich, New York, he graduated from Syracuse University in 1895, and earned a PhD at Cornell in 1902. Between 1895 and 1910 he taught biology and botany at New York State Normal College, Rutgers University, New York University, and the University of Missouri, and was laboratory director at the New York Botanical Garden. He was called to direct the Brooklyn Botanical Garden in 1910, and under his directorship the Garden expanded its role in public education, especially children's education. His works include the textbooks Fundamentals of Botany (1916) and General Botany, with Special Reference to its Economic Aspects (1926). He died in Waterville, Maine.

== Publications ==
- A Laboratory Guide for General Botany (1916)
- Fundamentals of Botany (1916)
- Heredity and Evolution in Plants (1920)
- General Botany, with Special Reference to its Economic Aspects (1926)
