= Droughts in the United States =

Percent Area in U.S. Drought Monitor Categories since year 2000.

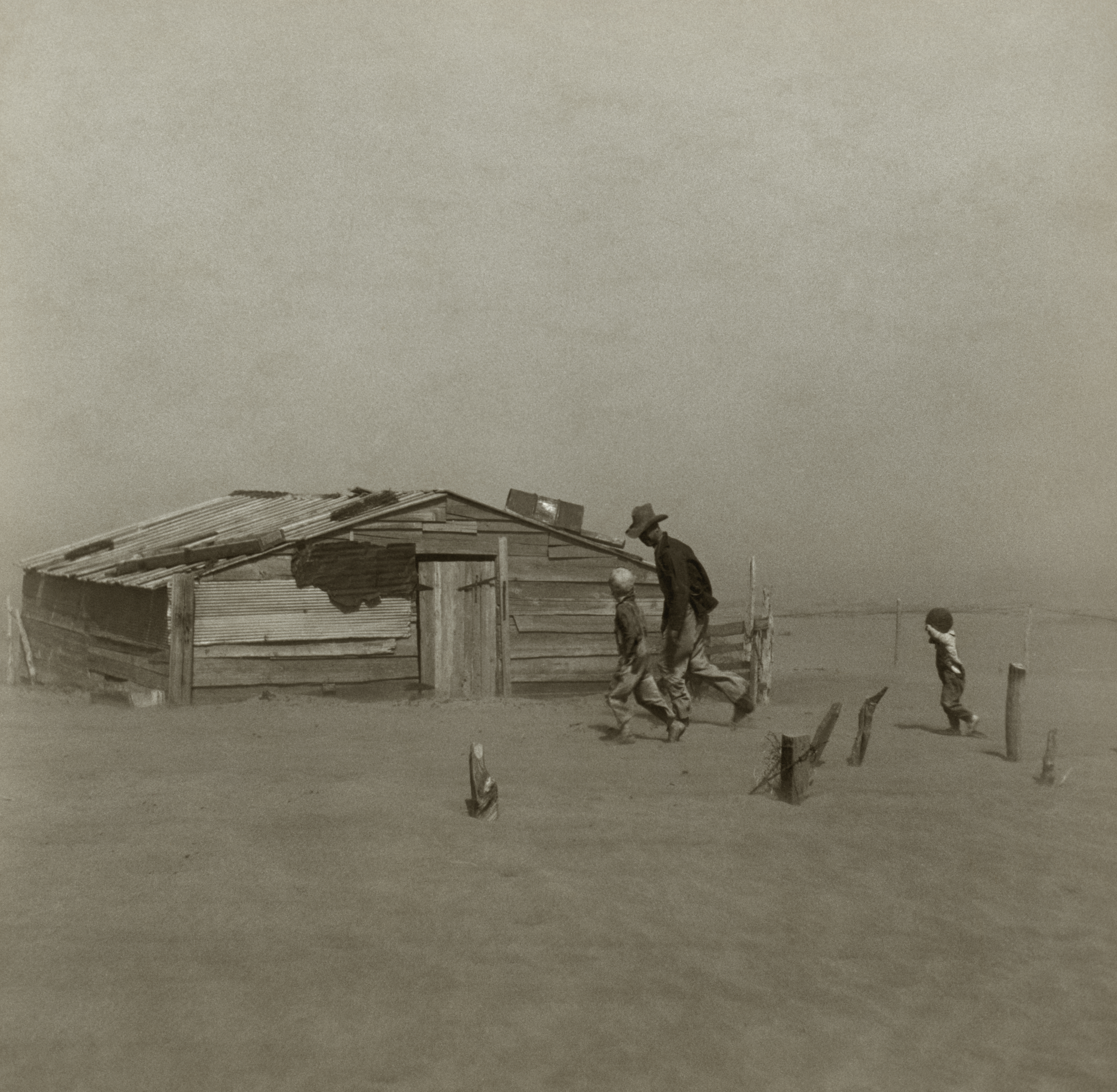
A farmer and his two sons during a dust storm in Cimarron County, Oklahoma, 1936. Photo: Arthur Rothstein.

The United States' contiguous western and especially southwestern region has experienced widespread drought since about year 2000. Below normal precipitation leads to drought, and is caused by an above average persistence of high pressure over the affected area. Changes in the track of extratropical cyclones, which can occur during climate cycles such as the El Niño-Southern Oscillation, or ENSO, as well as the North Atlantic Oscillation, Pacific Decadal Oscillation, and Atlantic multidecadal oscillation, modulate which areas are more prone to drought. Increased drought frequency and severity is also expected to be one of the effects of global warming.

Drought having an acute economic impact in the history of the United States occurred during the 1930s and 1940s, periods of time known as 'Dust Bowl' years where relief and health agencies became overburdened and many local community banks had to close. The event also led to significant changes in farming practices emphasizing soil conservation and water resource management, inspired further growth in U.S. water storage and delivery infrastructure as part of the New Deal, and influenced other social changes.

Furthermore, global La Niña meteorological events are generally associated with drier and hotter conditions and further exacerbation of droughts in California and the Southwestern and to some extent Southeastern United States. Meteorological scientists have observed that La Niñas have become more frequent over time.

== Metrics ==
The U.S. Drought Monitor provides a national database to track the duration and severity of droughts in the United States. It is hosted by the University of Nebraska–Lincoln with assistance from the United States Department of Agriculture and the National Oceanic and Atmospheric Administration. Their standardized measurements track droughts on a severity scale from "Abnormally Dry" (D0) to "Exceptional" (D4).

== Causes ==
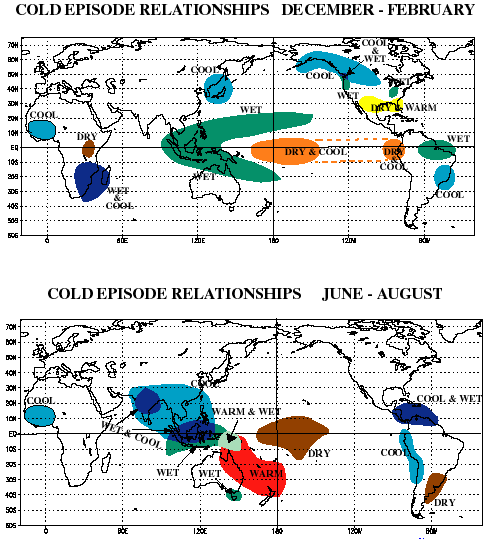
La Niña's impact on global climate

Mechanisms of producing precipitation include convective, stratiform, and orographic rainfall. Convective processes involve strong vertical motions that can cause the overturning of the atmosphere in that location within an hour and cause heavy precipitation, while stratiform processes involve weaker upward motions and less intense precipitation over a longer duration. Precipitation can be divided into three categories, based on whether it falls as liquid water, liquid water that freezes on contact with the surface, or ice.

If these factors do not support precipitation volumes sufficient to reach the surface over a sufficient period of time, the result is a drought. Drought can be triggered by a high level of reflected sunlight and above average prevalence of high pressure systems, winds carrying continental, rather than oceanic air masses, and ridges of high pressure areas aloft can prevent or restrict the developing of thunderstorm activity or rainfall over one certain region. Once a region is within drought, feedback mechanisms such as local arid air, hot conditions which can promote warm core ridging, and minimal evapotranspiration can worsen drought conditions. Winters during El Niño are warmer and drier than average in the Northwest, northern Midwest, and northern Mideast United States, so those regions experience reduced snowfalls.

Activities resulting in global climate change are expected to trigger droughts with a substantial impact on agriculture and increased social unrest throughout the world, especially in developing nations. Overall, global warming will result in increased world rainfall. Along with drought in some areas, flooding and erosion will increase in others. Paradoxically, some proposed solutions to global warming that focus on more active techniques, solar radiation management through the use of a space sunshade for one, may also carry with them increased chances of drought.

== Government responses ==
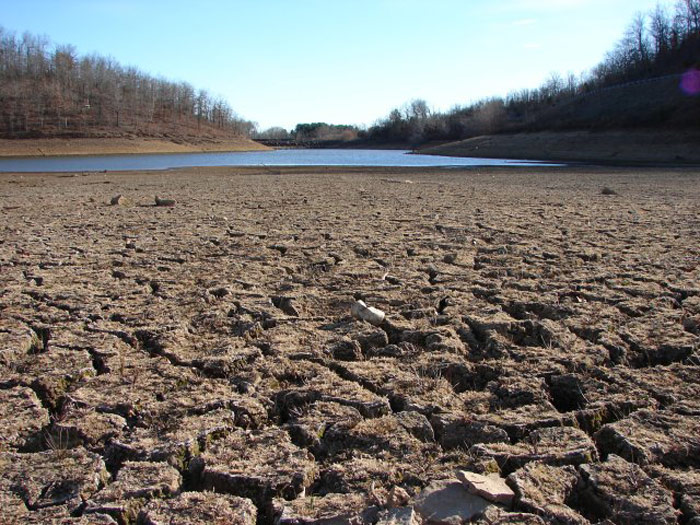
A typical dry lakebed is seen in California in 2009, which is experiencing its worst megadrought in 1,200 years, precipitated by climate change, and is therefore rationing water.

Perceptions differ along political lines, on whether climate change was a "major factor" contributing to various extreme weather events experienced by respondents.

Certain regions within the United States are more susceptible to droughts than others. Droughts can be more damaging than tornadoes, tropical cyclones, winter storms and flooding combined. Unlike a hurricane, tornado or flooding, the onset of droughts happen gradually over a long period of time.

In dry areas, removing grass cover and going with a more natural vegetation for the area can reduce the impact of drought, since a significant amount of fresh water is used to keep lawns green. In the Nevada "cash for grass" program, the people are paid to remove grass and put in desert landscaping, which calls for the planting of vegetation which is local in origin and more resistant to drought.

When California suffered a severe drought from 1985 to 1991, a California company, Sun Belt Water Inc. was established for the purpose importing water from Canada in marine transport vessels formerly used for oil transport and converted to water carriers. The idea was commercially viable and Sun Belt Water Inc., was selected by the Goleta Water District to enter a long-term contract. When the government of British Columbia reversed its existing bulk water export policy, the change in government policy led to a claim by Sun Belt Water Inc. against Canada under the provisions of Chapter 11 of the North American Free Trade Agreement (NAFTA).

The National Integrated Drought Information System (NIDIS) Act was signed into law in 2006 (Public Law 109-430). The Western Governors' Association described the need for NIDIS in a 2004 report, Creating a Drought Early Warning System for the 21st Century: The National Integrated Drought Information System. The NIDIS Act calls for an interagency, multi-partner approach to drought monitoring, forecasting, and early warning, led by the National Oceanic and Atmospheric Administration (NOAA). NIDIS is being developed to consolidate data on drought's physical, hydrological and socio-economic impacts on an ongoing basis, to develop drought decision support and simulation tools for critical, drought-sensitive areas, and to enable proactive planning by those affected by drought. NIDIS (www.drought.gov) draws on the personnel, experience, and networks of the National Drought Mitigation Center, the NOAA Regional Climate Centers, and the Regional Integrated Sciences and Assessments (RISAs), among others. Federal agencies and departments partnering in NIDIS include the U.S. Army Corps of Engineers, the Bureau of Reclamation, the U.S. Geological Survey, NASA, the U.S. Department of Energy, the U.S. Environmental Protection Agency, the National Science Foundation, and the Natural Resources Conservation Service.

President Roosevelt on April 27, 1935, signed documents creating the Soil Conservation Service (SCS)—now the Natural Resources Conservation Service (NRCS). Models of the law were sent to each state where they were enacted. These were the first enduring practical programs to curtail future susceptibility to drought, creating agencies that first began to stress soil conservation measures to protect farm lands today. It was not until the 1950s that there was an importance placed on water conservation was put into the existing laws (NRCS 2014).

== Events ==
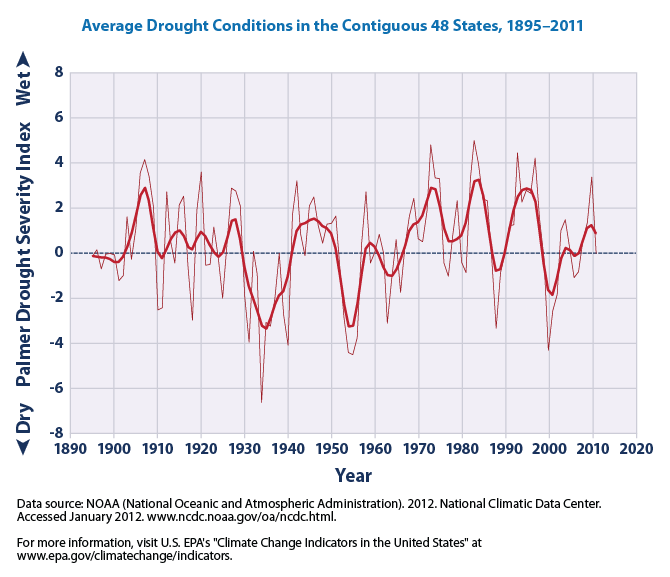
This graph shows average drought conditions in the contiguous 48 states, according to the EPA, with yearly data going from 1895 to 2011. The curve is a nine-year weighted average.

=== Pre-1800 ===
The earliest and longest drought discussed in the literature is the "Altithermal Long Drought", which some scholars now believe was in reality two severe shorter droughts (ca. 7000-6500 BP and 6000-5500 BP), separated by an interval. Other early notable droughts in North America include the Fairbank Drought of 500 BC and the Whitewater Drought of 330 C.E.

There were megadroughts in what is now the central and western United States, between 900 and 1300. A megadrought struck what is now the American Southwest 1276–1299 C.E., which severely affected the Pueblo cities, and tree rings also document drought in the lower and central Mississippi River basin between the 14th and 16th century. The droughts of that period may have contributed to the decline and fall of the Mississippian cultures. Data from tree rings indicate that the megadroughts which occurred throughout the twelfth and thirteenth centuries, exceeded anything which occurred within the twentieth century in both spatial extent and duration, including the Dust Bowl of the 1930s and drought in the 1950s, but was co-equal to the drought there in the early 21st century.

The 18th century seems to have been a relatively wet century in North America, but there were apparently droughts in Iowa in 1721, 1736, and from 1771 to 1773.

=== 19th Century ===
There were at least three major droughts in 19th-century North America: one from the mid-1850s to the mid-1860s, one in the 1870s, and one in the 1890s. There was also a drought around 1820; the periods from 1816 to 1844 and from 1849 to 1880 were rather dry, and the 19th century overall was a dry century for the Great Plains. While there was little rain-gauge data from the mid-19th century in the middle of the US, there were plenty of trees, and tree-ring data showed evidence of a major drought from around 1856 to around 1865. Native Americans were hard hit, as the bison they depended upon on the Plains moved to river valleys in search of water, and those valleys were full of natives and settlers alike. The river valleys were also home to domestic livestock, which competed against the bison for food. The result was starvation for many of the bison.

The 1870–1877 drought brought with it a major swarm of Rocky Mountain Locusts, as droughts benefit locusts, making plants more nutritious and edible to locusts and reducing diseases that harm locusts. Locusts also grow more quickly during a drought and gather in small spots of lush vegetation, enabling them to swarm, facts which contributed to the ruin of much of the farmland in the American West. The evidence for this drought is also primarily in tree-ring, rather than rain gauge, data.

The 1890s drought, between 1890 and 1896, was the first to be widely and adequately recorded by rain gauges, with much of the American West having been settled. Railroads promised land to people willing to settle it, and the period between 1877 and 1890 was wetter than usual, leading to unrealistic expectations of land productivity. The amount of land required to support a family in more arid regions was already larger than the amount that could realistically be irrigated by a family, but this fact was made more obvious by the drought, leading to emigration from recently settled lands. The Federal government started to assist with irrigation with the 1902 Reclamation Act.

=== 1930s ===
The Dust Bowl or the Dirty Thirties was a period of severe dust storms causing major ecological and agricultural damage to American and Canadian prairie lands from 1930 to 1936 (in some areas until 1940). The phenomenon was caused by severe drought coupled with decades of extensive farming without crop rotation, fallow fields, cover crops or other techniques to prevent erosion. Deep plowing of the virgin topsoil of the Great Plains had displaced the natural grasses that normally kept the soil in place and trapped moisture even during periods of drought and high winds.

During the drought of the 1930s, without natural anchors to keep the soil in place, it dried, turned to dust, and blew away eastward and southward in large dark clouds. At times the clouds blackened the sky reaching all the way to East Coast cities such as New York and Washington, D.C. Much of the soil ended up deposited in the Atlantic Ocean, carried by prevailing winds which were in part created by the dry and bare soil conditions itself. These immense dust storms—given names such as "Black Blizzards" and "Black Rollers"—often reduced visibility to a few feet (around a meter). The Dust Bowl affected 100,000,000 acres (400,000 km^{2}), centered on the panhandles of Texas and Oklahoma, and adjacent parts of New Mexico, Colorado, and Kansas.

Millions of acres of farmland became useless, and hundreds of thousands of people were forced to leave their homes; many of these families (often known as "Okies", since so many of them came from Oklahoma) traveled to California and other states, where they found economic conditions little better than those they had left. Owning no land, many traveled from farm to farm picking fruit and other crops at starvation wages. Author John Steinbeck later wrote The Grapes of Wrath, which won the Pulitzer Prize, and Of Mice and Men about such people.

Negative effects included bank closures and overburdened relief and health agencies. Economic migrants also had mixed success as native workers in many areas resented the intense competition for dwindling jobs. The National Drought Mitigation Center has reported that financial assistance from the government alone may have been as high as $1 billion (in 1930s dollars) by the end of the drought.

=== 1940s ===
Drought began in the Southwestern United States in 1944 and continued through the entire rest of the decade; one of the longest recorded droughts observed there. This drought continued into the 1950s.

=== 1950s ===
Other severe drought years in the United States happened through the 1950s. These droughts continued from the 1940s drought in the Southwestern United States, New Mexico and Texas during 1950 and 1951; the drought was widespread through the Central Plains, Midwest and certain Rocky Mountain States, particularly between the years 1953 and 1957, and by 1956 parts of central Nebraska reached a drought index of −7, three points below the extreme drought index. From 1950 to 1957, Texas experienced the most severe drought in recorded history. By the time the drought ended, 244 of Texas's 254 counties had been declared federal disaster areas. Drought became particularly severe in California, with some natural lakes drying up completely in 1953. Southern California was hit hard by drought in 1958–1959, badly straining water resources. A widespread, 1930s-style dust storm affected the Plains and beyond on 19 February 1954 driven by winds of up to 100 mph/161 km/h, drifting soil to 3 feet/a metre deep in some areas.

=== 1960s ===
The Northeastern United States were hit with devastating drought which lasted almost four to five years in the 1960s, peaking in 1965. The drought affected multiple regional cities from Virginia into Pennsylvania, New Jersey, New York, and Connecticut; the drought also affected certain Midwest States, including Wisconsin, Iowa, Illinois, Minnesota, Missouri and the Great Plains. Drought continued in parts of California in the early 1960s. Southern California recorded its worst drought of the 20th century in 1961.

=== 1970s ===
Short term droughts hit particular spots of the United States during 1976 and 1977. California's statewide snowpack reached an all-time low in 1977. Water resources and agriculture (especially livestock) suffered; negatively impacting the nation's economy. This drought reversed itself completely the following year.

=== 1980s ===
Droughts also affected the Northeast US, Corn Belt and Midwest States during 1980 and 1983. The 1983 Midwestern States Drought was associated with very dry conditions, severe heat and substandard crop growth which affected prices and caused hardship for farmers. Multiple disaster declarations went out in Indiana and neighboring states because of the 1983 drought. Readings of 100 °F (38 °C) or higher became prevalent in 1983 during these dry spells across the Midwest, Ohio Valley Regions and Great Lakes. Kentucky declared the 1983 drought their second-worst in the 20th century; 1983 was Ohio's driest calendar year. Los Angeles received more rainfall than Cleveland that year. The drought forced many trees and shrubs into dormancy and created water shortages in many towns. The associating heat waves killed between 500 and 700 people in the United States. Similar spells during 1980 caused between 4000 and 12000 deaths in the United States along with $24 billion in damage 1980 USD.

A severe drought struck the Southeast from 1985 through 1987. It began in 1985 from the Carolinas west-southwest into Alabama, when annual rainfall was reduced by 5 to 35 percent below what was normal. Light precipitation continued into the spring of 1986, with Atlanta, Georgia recording their driest first six months on record. High amounts of precipitation during the winter of 1987 ended the drought.

The Western United States experienced a lengthy drought in the late 1980s. California went through one of its longest observed droughts, from late 1986 through early 1991. Drought worsened in 1988–1989, as much of the United States also suffered from severe drought. In California, the five-year drought ended in late 1991 as a result of unusual persistent heavy rains, most likely caused by a significant El Niño event in the Pacific Ocean and the eruption of Mount Pinatubo in June 1991.

Another significant drought in the United States occurred during 1988 and 1989. Following a milder drought in the Southeastern United States the year before, this drought spread from the Mid-Atlantic, Southeast, Midwest, Northern Great Plains and Western United States. This drought was widespread, unusually intense and accompanied by heat waves which killed around 4,800 to 17,000 people across the United States and also killed livestock across the United States. One particular reason that the drought of 1988 became very damaging was farmers might have farmed on land which was marginally arable. Another reason was pumping groundwater near the depletion mark. The drought of 1988 destroyed crops almost nationwide, residents' lawns went brown and water restrictions were declared in many cities. The Yellowstone National Park fell victim to wildfires that burned many trees and created exceptional destruction in the area. This drought was very catastrophic for multiple reasons; it continued across the Upper Midwest States and North Plains States during 1989, not officially ending until 1990.

The conditions continued into 1989 and 1990, although the drought had ended in some states thanks to normal rainfalls returning to some portions of the United States. Dry conditions, however, increased again during 1989, affecting Iowa, Illinois, Missouri, much of Nebraska, Kansas, Minnesota and some regions of Colorado. The drought also affected Canada in certain divisions. The drought of 1988 became the worst drought since the Dust Bowl 50 years before in the United States; 2008 estimates put damages from the drought somewhere between $80 billion and almost $120 billion in damage (2008 USD). The drought of 1988 was so devastating that in later years it was compared against Hurricane Andrew in 1992 and against Hurricane Katrina; in addition, it would be the costliest of the three events: Hurricane Katrina comes second with $81 billion (2005 United States dollars), Hurricane Andrew coming in third. The drought of 1988 qualifies being the costliest natural disaster in the history of the United States.

=== 1990s ===
During 1993 the Southeastern United States experienced high temperatures and conditions of drought for extended periods. The heat waves associated caused the deaths of seventeen people and overall damage from the Southeastern-state drought of 1993 was somewhere between $1 billion and $3 billion in damage (1993 U.S. dollars).

drought has caused over the United States damage amounting to an estimated $40 billion in 1998.

Similar drought conditions hit the Northeast United States during 1999 – the Northeast, including Kentucky, New York, New Jersey, Pennsylvania and Maryland were pummeled by extensive heat waves which killed almost 700 people across the Northeastern U.S. and unusually dry conditions caused billions of dollars in destruction during 1999. This unusually damaging drought was reminiscent of the Northeast United States drought of the 1960s considering it affected similar states within the Northeast United States and New England.

=== 2000s ===
The Midwest and Rocky Mountain regions had a drought during 2002, which was accompanied by dry conditions, wildfires and hot temperatures over the Western US and Midwest areas. The U.S. drought of 2002 turned a normal fire season into a very dangerous, treacherous and violent season. Denver was forced to impose mandatory limits regarding water for the first time in twenty-one years, as Colorado and other states in the Southwest were hit particularly hard by the severe drought conditions in 2002. The Quad Cities had around 8 inches (200 mm) below average rainfall during 2002 (normal precipitation is 38.06 inches (967 mm) every year, during 2002 30.00 inches (762 mm) were recorded). The 2001–2002 rain season in Southern California was the driest since records began in 1877. San Diego recorded only 2.99 inches (76 mm), compared to the annual average of 10.34 inches (263 mm). Records were broken in an even worse drought just five years later, during the 2006–07 rain season in Los Angeles (3.21 inches (82 mm) compared to the annual average of 15.14 inches (385 mm)).

The U.S. drought of 2002 was reminiscent of the 1988 drought and was compared to the droughts of the 1930s, the 1983 drought and the dry spells of the 1950s. The drought also affected Saskatchewan, Manitoba and Alberta, in Canada.

Although the Western United States and Southwestern U.S. are most likely to be hit, droughts can also happen over the Upper Midwestern States, the Central Great Plains, Southeast United States, the Middle Atlantic, the Great Lakes Region, the Ohio River Valley, Northeastern United States and even New England. Droughts vary in severity and have potential for causing elevated to exceptional damage wherever they focus their area toward.

There were extensive droughts through the 2000s (decade) all over the Southeastern United States, continuing as far westward as Texas. The Southeastern United States were affected by heavy droughts extending from the Carolinas toward Mississippi and even into Tennessee and Kentucky. Droughts affecting Florida were so severe that lakes were drying out. Wildfires, forest fires, and brush fires were very prevalent in association with the 2000s (decade) drought in the Southeastern United States. The 2006–2008 Southeastern United States drought caused over $1 billion in damage. The drought of 2006–2007 in California contributed to the extreme severity of the 2007 California wildfires.

Missouri, Arkansas, (portions of) Louisiana, Tennessee, southeast Iowa and northern Illinois were hit with severe droughts and heat during 2005. The conditions caused $1 billion in overall damage, there were no deaths attributed to the drought and associated heat spells. The Quad Cities themselves received only 17.88 inches (454 mm) of precipitation during 2005.

In 2008 and 2009, much of south and south-central Texas were in a state of exceptional drought.

California also experienced a multiyear drought, peaking in 2007–2009, when a statewide drought emergency was issued. Although reports of widespread agricultural losses were reduced in later analysis, large decreases were seen in many fish populations in the region, and additional reliance on groundwater in farming may have set the precedent for further damages in the 2012–2015 California drought.

=== 2010s ===
The California drought continued through 2010 and did not end until March 2011. The drought shifted east during the summer of 2011 to affect a large portion of the Southwest and Texas. See above for additional information on this drought. In 2013 and early 2014, the California drought returned and intensified, expanding to much of the western US. In 2013, many places in California set all-time low precipitation records, with very little measurable rain falling across much of the state from January 2013 into mid-February 2014. San Francisco nearly halved its previous annual record low in 2013, receiving only 5.59 inches compared to a normal of 23.65. The 2012–2013 and 2013–2014 winter snowpacks were among the lowest recorded in the last 100 years. In January 2014, the state cut allocations from its State Water Project to zero percent (revised upwards to five percent in April), a record low, as reservoirs dropped to critical levels. Municipal districts in the northern and central parts of the state, including the capital, Sacramento, enacted water rationing while over half a million acres (2000 km^{2}) of Central Valley farmland were fallowed. In 2015, wildfires burned over 7 million acres, primarily in the western U.S. and Alaska, which is approaching the all-time national record.

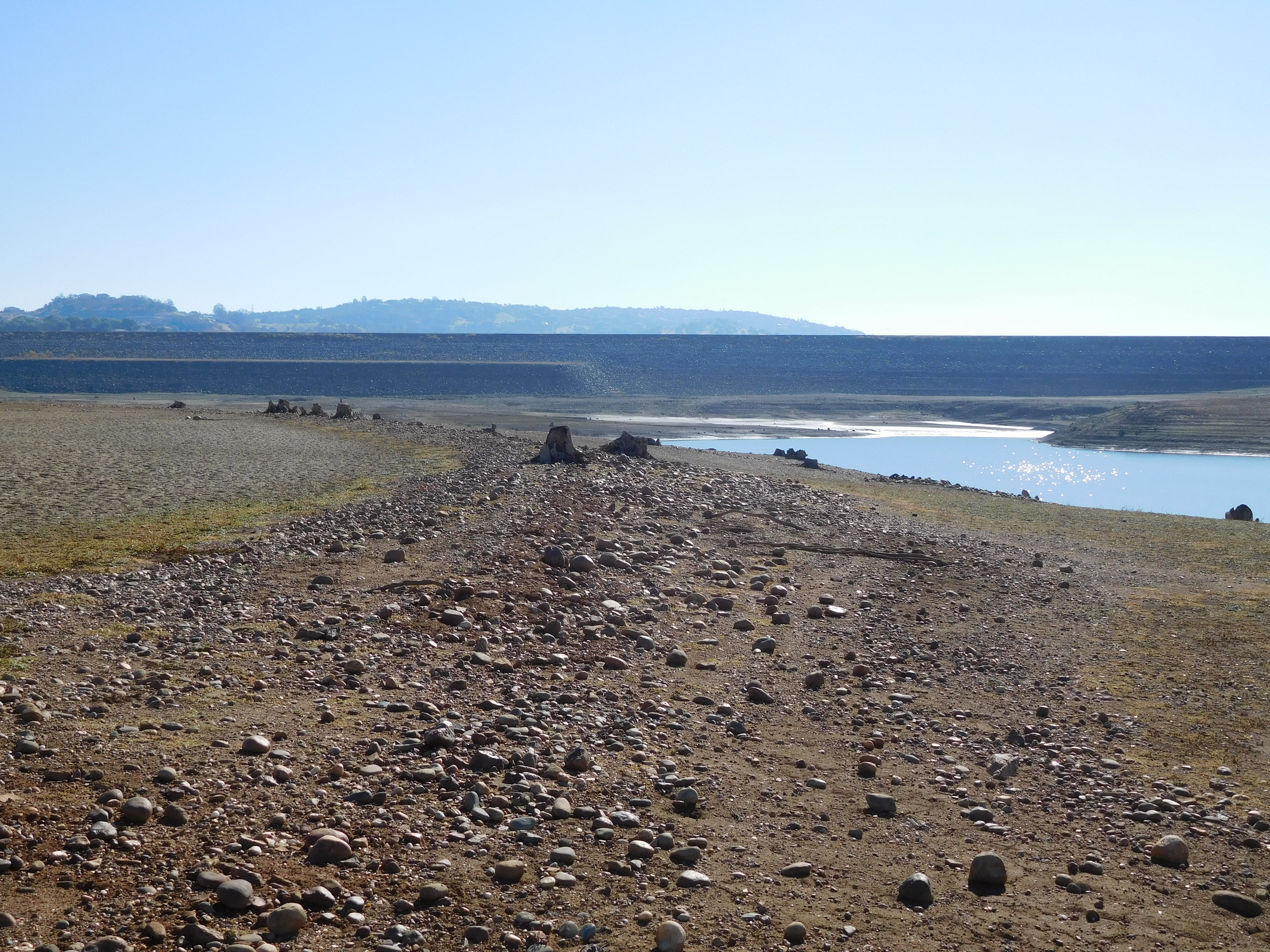
Folsom Lake reservoir during the California drought in 2015

In 2011 intense drought struck much of Texas, New Mexico and a large portion of the Southwest bringing much of the region its worst drought seen since the Dust Bowl years of the 1930s. Most of the drought in Texas ended or had it impacts ease by spring and summer 2012 as precipitation returned to the region, while the New Mexican drought continued unbroken into 2014. The Texas and Southwest U.S. drought was also accompanied by a severe heat wave that brought record setting heat to much of Texas, including but not limited to bringing a 40-day stretch of temperatures at or above 100 °F (38 °C) to Dallas, Texas. Drought of severe magnitude also affected a large portion of the Southeastern US, especially Georgia and South Carolina. It is believed that a combination of La Niña and climate change had contributed to the intense drought.

In 2012, much of the U.S. had drought conditions develop through the late winter and spring months and lasting into the summer, creating the 2012 North American drought. Meanwhile, severe to extreme drought developed in the lower Midwest and Ohio Valley as well as the southern and central Rockies. This led to large wildfires in Colorado including the record setting Waldo Canyon fire, the most destructive in Colorado history. Drought conditions have led to numerous firework show cancellations and voluntary water restrictions in much of the Ozarks, Mid-Mississippi and Ohio River Valleys. Lagging effects of La Niña, climate change, and also a large persistent upper level ridge of high pressure present over much of North America since the late winter have all contributed to the drought and above average temperatures since February 2012. This further lead to the vicious cycle of reduced evaporation and decreased rainfall all through the spring of 2012. While the summer of 2011 was the second-warmest (74.5 °F (23.6 °C)) in U.S. history after the Dust Bowl era of 1936 74.6 °F (23.7 °C) the summer of 2012 was the third-warmest at (74.4 °F (23.6 °C)). This intense heat wave contributed to the intensification of the drought particularly over the Midwest and the Northern Plains. Because the drought conditions were forcing American farmers to sell off livestock, the Department of Defense sought to buy up meat at "fire sale" prices in order to stockpile meals for the lean times ahead.

High wheat prices caused by the drought have discouraged farmers from investing in alternative drought-tolerant crops.

The United States Drought Monitor observed "extreme drought" conditions in much of the eastern half of Massachusetts, southeastern New Hampshire and the southern part of Maine in September 2016.

In summer 2016, severe drought affected the temperate New England and New York area, including a Massachusetts and New York drought that persisted into the fall. While not as severe as other major, more well-known droughts in the south and west where the climate is semi-arid, it was among the most severe for the northeastern region.

Hydrologist Royce Fontenot said in 2019 that the impact of drought will linger according to the La Niña pattern.

=== 2020s ===
In the 21st century, the water level of Lake Powell has declined from near maximum capacity to within 30 feet (9.1 m) of the minimum level needed for Glen Canyon Dam to generate electricity.

In the 21st century, the water level of Lake Mead has declined from near maximum capacity to within 100 feet (30 m) of the minimum level needed for Hoover Dam to generate electricity.

Beginning in summer 2020, drought was widespread in the Dakotas, New Mexico, Colorado, Wyoming, Iowa, Nebraska, and Kansas; as well as parts of Missouri, Illinois, and Minnesota.

In July 2021, after two more extremely dry winters, Lake Powell dropped to its lowest level since 1969 when the reservoir was first filling. Lake Mead fell to a level expected to trigger federally mandated cuts to Arizona and Nevada's water supplies for the first time in history.

Between 2020 and 2022, eastern Connecticut experienced one of the worst droughts in the last 100 years. Many towns in eastern Connecticut have water restrictions and regional agricultural has been extensively impacted.

Beginning in June 2024; a historic flash drought impacted much of West Virginia and parts of Ohio and neighboring states. On August 29, 2024, the U.S. Drought Monitor highlighted an exceptional drought area over parts of West Virginia and Ohio; which was the first time in the Drought Monitor’s history that an exceptional drought had been highlighted over West Virginia.

In 2026, Utah also had a drought, recording the dryest January–May on Record since 1895. The drought threatens to dry up the Great Salt Lake which would create uninhabitable conditions for many in the area due to toxic dust including arsenic.

== See also ==
- Climate of the United States
- Drought in Australia
- National Drought Policy Commission
- United States rainfall climatology
- Water scarcity
- Atmospheric water generator
- Desalination
