= Francis Childs =

Francis Childs may refer to:

- Francis Childs (farmer)
- Francis Childs (printer)

== See also ==
- Francis Child (disambiguation)
