= Charles Herbster =

American agribusiness executive and politician (born 1954)

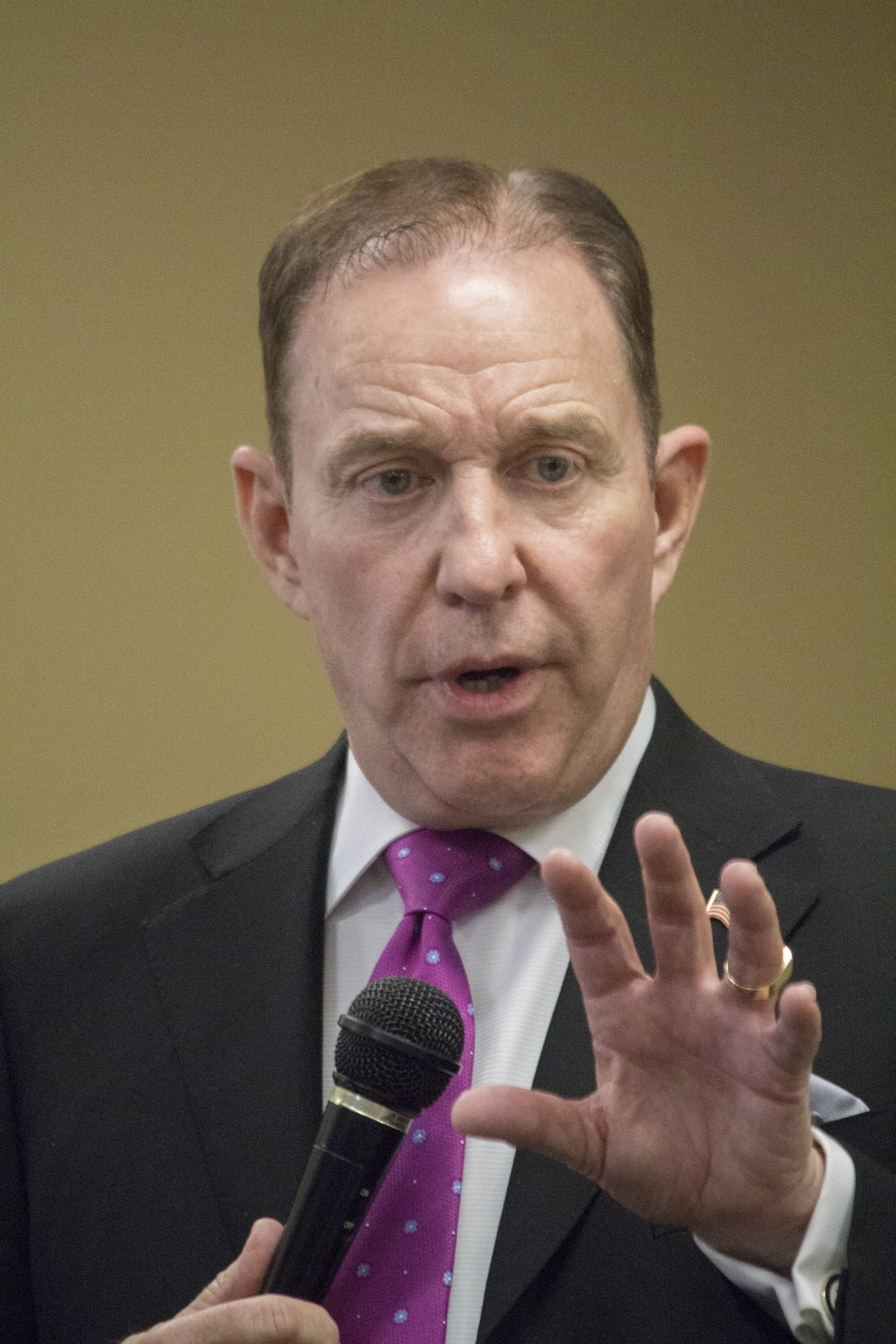
- Herbster in 2022

Personal details
- Born: Charles Wesley Herbster; 1954 (age 71–72) Falls City, Nebraska, U.S.
- Party: Republican
- Spouses: Lorienne Smith (m. 1975; div. 1980); Judith Wagg (m. 1982; died 2017)
- Education: University of Nebraska–Lincoln (attended)

Charles Wesley Herbster (born 1954) is an American agribusiness executive, cattle producer, political donor, and politician. He was an agriculture advisor and chairman of Donald Trump's agriculture and rural advisory committee during Trump's 2020 presidential campaign. He also sought the Republican nomination for Governor of Nebraska in 2014 and 2022, losing to Pete Ricketts and Jim Pillen respectively.

== Early life and education ==
Charles Wesley Herbster was born in Falls City, Nebraska, in 1954 as the only child of Donald Eugene Herbster and Dorothy M. Herbster (née Carico). Herbster graduated from Falls City High School. He attended the University of Nebraska–Lincoln for two years but dropped out and returned home after the death of his mother.

== Career ==
=== Agriculture ===
Herbster is a cattle producer and owns Herbster Angus Farms in Falls City. Herbster's farm in Falls City began as a homestead in 1847 owned by William McKendry Maddox, Herbster's great-great-grandfather. The ranch passed through Maddox's granddaughter, Leta Meyers Carico, who was Herbster's maternal grandmother and whom Herbster credits as his first teacher and mentor. Herbster stated his farming practice was inspired in part by champion grower Francis Childs, known for his heavy use of chemicals and deep plowing methods.

He also owns Conklin Co., a Kansas City, Missouri-based manufacturing company, which is structured as a multi-level marketing (MLM) business, which he purchased from Bob Conklin with his wife, Judith, in 1992. Conklin sells agricultural products including pesticide additives, farm fertilizers, probiotics for livestock, industrial roof coatings, and motor oils.

Herbster also owns the cattle breeding firm North American Breeders, which is located in Berryville, Virginia. Herbster bought North American Breeders in 2015. As a breeder, Herbster purchased multiple cows for over $100,000 and multiple bulls for over $600,000 from Schaff's Angus Valley. In February 2019, Herbster purchased the highest-priced bull in auction history, paying $1.5 million for a bull called SAV America (SAV stand for Schaff's Angus Valley), which would be used as breeding stock on Herbster's Virginia farm. He later bought a one-year-old Angus bull for $2.14 million at a North Dakota auction. Livestock show magazine, The Showtimes, noted Herbster Angus Farms for the adherence of its cattle to Angus breed standards and along with high value breeders, Herbster frequently purchases winning cattle at youth cattle shows as a way to support youth in the industry. This, along with Herbster's activity in high cost cattle breeding operations led to his being inducted into The Showtimes Magazine Hall of Fame in November 2017.

=== Political involvement ===
Herbster donated $500 to the National Republican Congressional Committee in 2004 and $2,300 to a Republican candidate in the 2008 United States House of Representatives elections in Indiana. In 2012, Herbster donated $91,600 to a PAC supporting the Mitt Romney 2012 presidential campaign, $10,000 towards the Nebraska Republican Party, and $2,500 for Deb Fischer's campaign. From 2013 to 2015, Herbster contributed nearly $100,000 towards the Republican National Committee and $10,000 to Robert Aderholt. In 2014, Herbster created the Republican-leaning Ag American super-PAC and contributed $100,000 between 2014 and 2015.

Herbster met Donald Trump in 2013 at Mar-a-Lago.

For six weeks, Herbster was a candidate in 2014 Nebraska gubernatorial election. He withdrew from the race after concerns were raised about his Nebraska residency. He later invested $2.7 million into then-Nebraska state senator Beau McCoy's campaign. Herbster also hinted to the Omaha World-Herald that he funded dark money ads promoting McCoy and attacking other candidates. McCoy placed third in the Republican primary.

Herbster was listed as a possible pick for U.S. Secretary of Agriculture in November 2016, days after Trump's election. Sonny Perdue was announced to that position in January 2017, after which the Independent Cattlemen of Nebraska and 13 other trade groups requested that U.S. President Donald Trump select Herbster as the United States deputy secretary of agriculture. In 2019, Herbster served as the chairman of Trump's agriculture and rural advisory committee. He served as an agricultural advisor in the Donald Trump 2020 presidential campaign.

On January 5, 2021, Herbster participated in a meeting at Trump International Hotel with Donald Trump Jr., Eric Trump, Tommy Tuberville, Michael Flynn, Peter Navarro, Corey Lewandowski, David Bossie, Rudy Giuliani, and Adam Piper. Txtwire CEO Daniel Beck stated he also attended the meeting, along with Mike Lindell. The group discussed how to pressure more members of Congress to object to the Electoral College results that made Joe Biden the winner of the 2020 election. Herbster also attended Trump's speech on January 6, 2021. Following the rally, he returned to the White House with Trump family members, and he flew to Florida with Donald Trump Jr. and Kimberly Guilfoyle after the 2021 United States Capitol attack began.

=== 2022 gubernatorial election ===
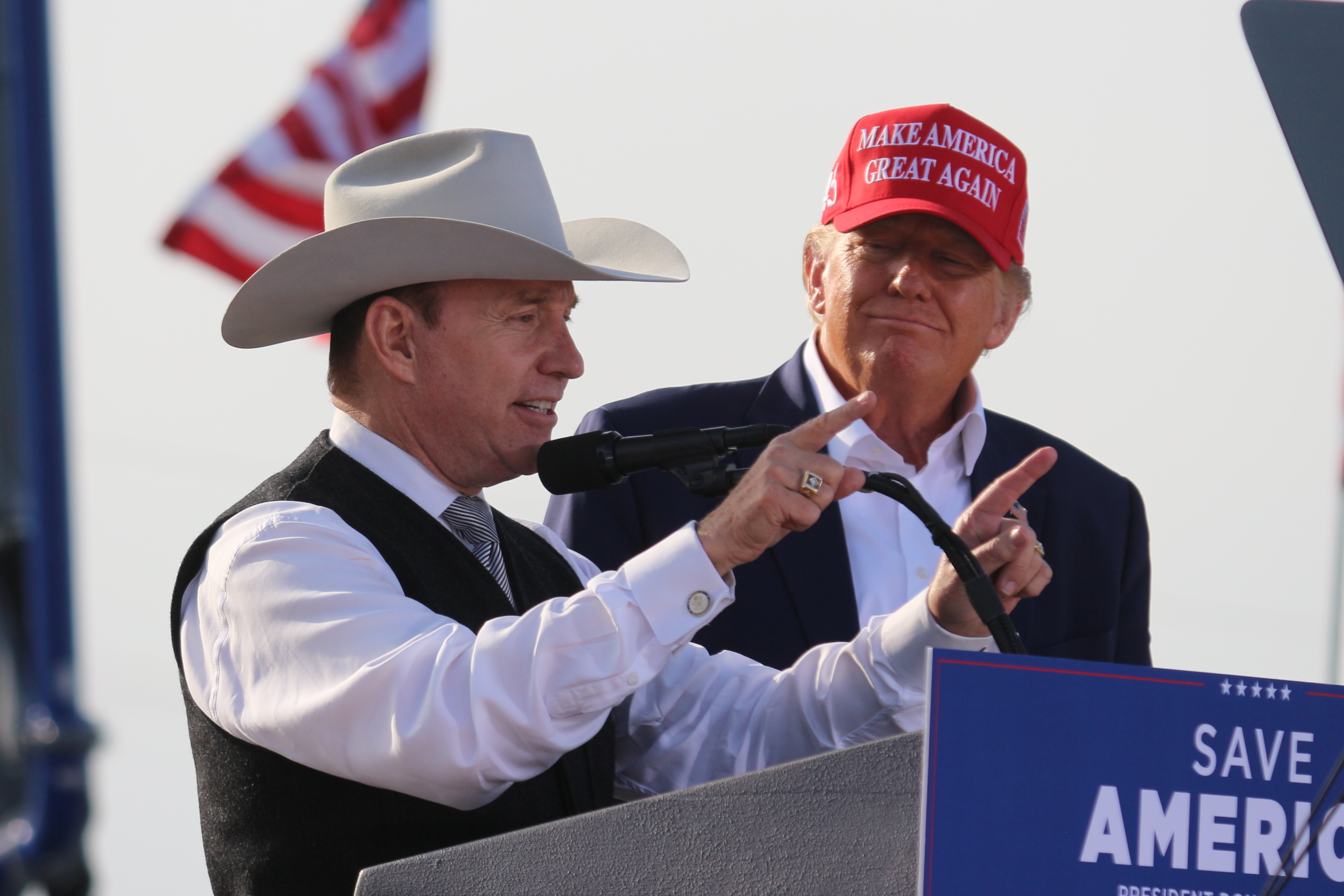
Herbster campaigning with Donald Trump in May 2022

In November 2020, Herbster established a campaign committee in preparation for a second gubernatorial race. He selected Omaha City Councilwoman Aimee Melton as his campaign treasurer. On April 26, 2021, Herbster declared his candidacy in the 2022 Nebraska gubernatorial election. Until September 2021, Corey Lewandowski served as a senior advisor before he was let go amid sexual harassment allegations. In 2021, Herbster called Ben Sasse a "Looney Tune Senator." Herbster is opposed to the estate tax in the United States, and his opposition to critical race theory was a central part of his gubernatorial campaign.

KMTV reported in June 2021 that Herbster had almost 600 late property tax payments on his various properties in Colorado, Iowa, Missouri, Nebraska. and Virginia. Herbster responded that the funds were used for payroll; however, he gave personal donations totaling millions to political campaigns during this same time period.

Donald Trump endorsed Herbster in late 2021. Herbster has shifted between supporting the idea that Trump won the 2020 election and stating Joe Biden is the "duly elected" President. Incumbent governor Pete Ricketts denounced the endorsement. Reid Epstein of The New York Times characterized the Trump endorsement as the "entire rationale" for the campaign.

In May 2022, Herbster lost the primary election, placing second behind businessman Jim Pillen.

== Sexual assault allegations ==
In April 2022, the Nebraska Examiner published a story stating that Nebraska state senator Julie Slama and seven other women accused Herbster of groping or forcibly kissing them dating back to 2017. The allegations were supported by witnesses. Herbster denies the allegations. Two weeks later, a former legislative assistant to State Senator Dave Murman publicly accused Herbster of groping her at the same event in which Slama accused Herbster of groping her.

Herbster filed a defamation lawsuit against Slama in Johnson County District Court. Three days later, Slama filed a countersuit against Herbster alleging that Herbster had committed sexual battery. Her lawyer called Herbster's lawsuit "a frivolous and bad faith attempt to bully a sexual assault victim into silence." In court papers, Slama gave specific and graphic details on how Herbster assaulted her in public and requested a jury trial.

Slama's lawyers sought to depose Herbster before the primary election, but Herbster's lawyers successfully delayed a deposition of their client in May 2022 and continued to resist a deposition in June 2022. Slama accused Herbster of waging a "prejudicial media war" against her.

Although Donald Trump continued to support Herbster in his run for governor after the allegations were made public, in April 2022 the "former president relayed word that Herbster wasn't fighting back hard enough" to dispel the assault allegations which encouraged Herbster to release video attack ads against Slama without directly mentioning her name.

In October 2022, Herbster and Slama dropped their lawsuits against one another.

== Personal life ==
Herbster considers himself an evangelical Christian. While a student at the University of Nebraska–Lincoln, Herbster married fellow student Lorienne Gayle Smith in 1975. Their marriage ended in divorce in 1980. In 1982, he married Judith Ann Wagg, whom he met through his work at Conklin Company. It was reported that Judith Herbster died on May 2, 2017.
