= Climate of New York =

Climate of New York may refer to:

- Climate of New York (state)
- Climate of New York City
