= 2016 New York drought =

Natural disaster in New York, United States

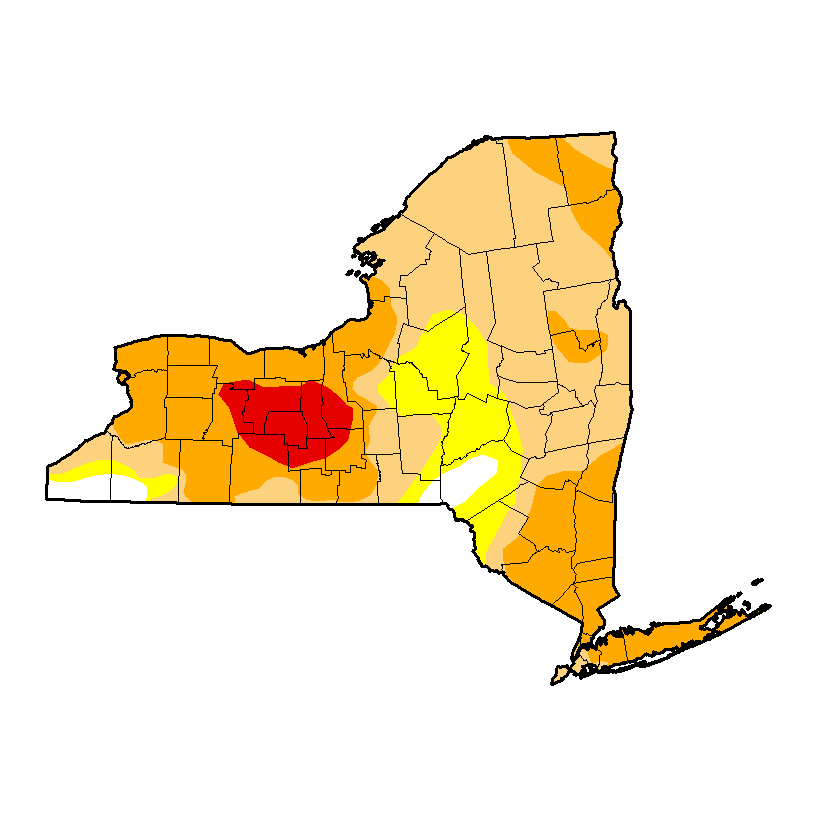
October 18 US Drought Monitor report showing nearly the entire state in some level of drought, with the worst conditions centered around the Finger Lakes region.

The 2016 New York Drought was by some measures the worst drought to affect Western New York and parts of the Finger Lakes Region and Southern Tier on record. By the middle of July, the percent of the state by area that was in a D-2 (Severe Drought) according to the United States Drought Monitor was 23.01%, the greatest amount since the weekly reports began in 2000. Nearly 90% of the state was classified as "Abnormally Dry" or "Moderate Drought". For reference, none of the state has ever been placed in D-4 (Exceptional Drought) since the year 2000. Furthermore, The Buffalo News reported on July 22 that it had become the worst drought in the Buffalo area since their main weather station opened in 1943. There was a longer term dry period through the 1960s in New York with greater duration but less intensity.

By July the New York State Department of Environmental Conservation (DEC) had placed the entire state in a "drought watch". While the drought is not nearly as severe as other droughts that take place in the west and midwestern United States in terms of duration and crop loss, droughts of this magnitude are rare in the humid temperate climate of Upstate New York. The drought began with a winter that in many areas in the northeast set a record warm December through February, leading to a weak spring meltoff.

== Early summer ==
Although May saw decent rainfall, the preceding and following months saw great deficits. Streams and ponds dried or saw near record low flow rates, and the water table lowered significantly in some areas. Many large rivers, including the Genesee River, were running at about 20% of normal, many below the fifth percentile. Historical remains were briefly visible in the Genesee riverbed including a defunct fountain and a cofferdam where trains ran during early 20th century riverbed deepening to reduce flooding, as well as historic building foundations. Some crops began to fail by July, including crops that did not germinate in the dry soil, and production and nutrition was low in crops that did mature. Perennial crops including fruit trees, Christmas trees, and strawberries were also affected, with deeper root crops such as corn about half the normal height by early August. Significant shortfalls in pasture and hay production compounded very low milk prices to put an existential strain on local dairy farms. Due to extensive watering, the 2016 Garden Walk Buffalo was not significantly impacted. In mid July, the state issued a drought watch for the first time since 2002.

== Summer ==
By late July, the area under the severe drought widened slightly to 26.82% despite widespread rains that exceeded an inch in parts of Western New York. The 215-foot (66 m) Taughannock Falls slowed to such a minimal flow that hiking the nearly empty riverbed of Taughannock Creek was permitted in Taughannock Falls State Park. On July 27, The Ithaca Journal reported that the Ithaca water supply reservoir was critically low, within a month of running dry, as areas creeks reached record lows. With many locations receiving less than half and as low as a third the normal amount of spring-summer rain, local wells ran dry. Anecdotally, rainfall was less than a quarter of normal with the drought being the worst in at least a half century. On August 3 the DEC, under direction of governor Andrew Cuomo, moved the entire Western portion of the state to drought warning, while the rest of the state remained under a drought watch.

Statistically, it was the fifth driest spring-summer (March–July) period in Buffalo (9.07 inches (23.0 cm)) since record keeping began in 1871, with 1941 (9.00 inches (22.9 cm)), 1915 (8.92 inches (22.7 cm)), 1898 (8.34 inches (21.2 cm)), and 1934 (7.75 inches (19.7 cm)) eclipsing it. However, this does not account for the mild winter or the above average temperatures and low humidity of the 2016 summer. Additionally, the rain was intermittent in larger amounts versus multi-day periods of slower, soaking rain.

== Late summer ==
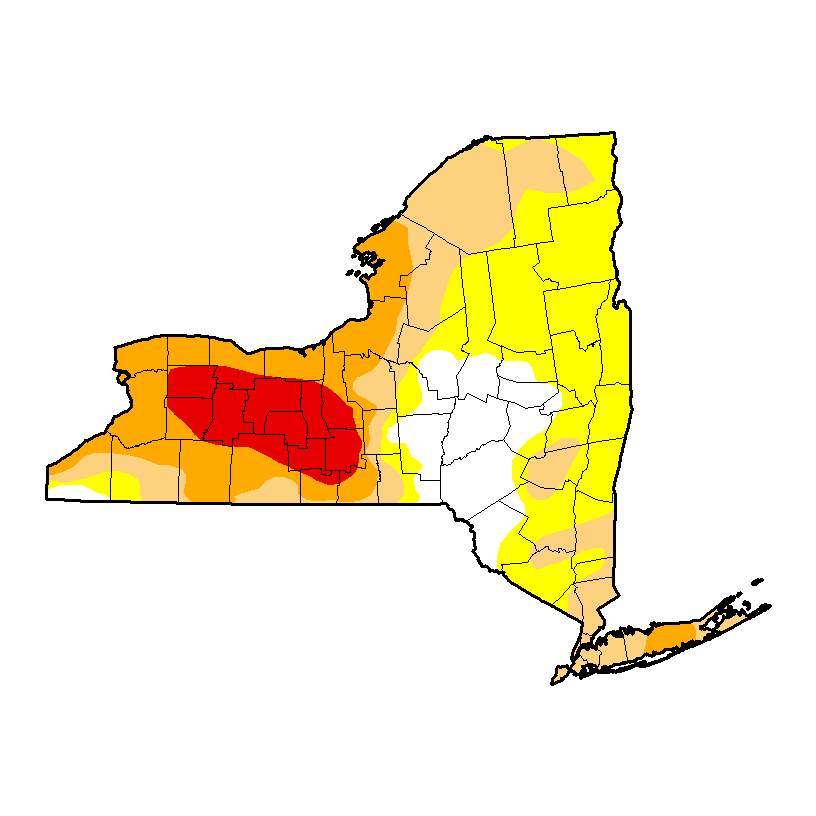
September 6 Drought Monitor report showing virtually the entire Finger Lakes region in a D-3 Extreme Drought state.

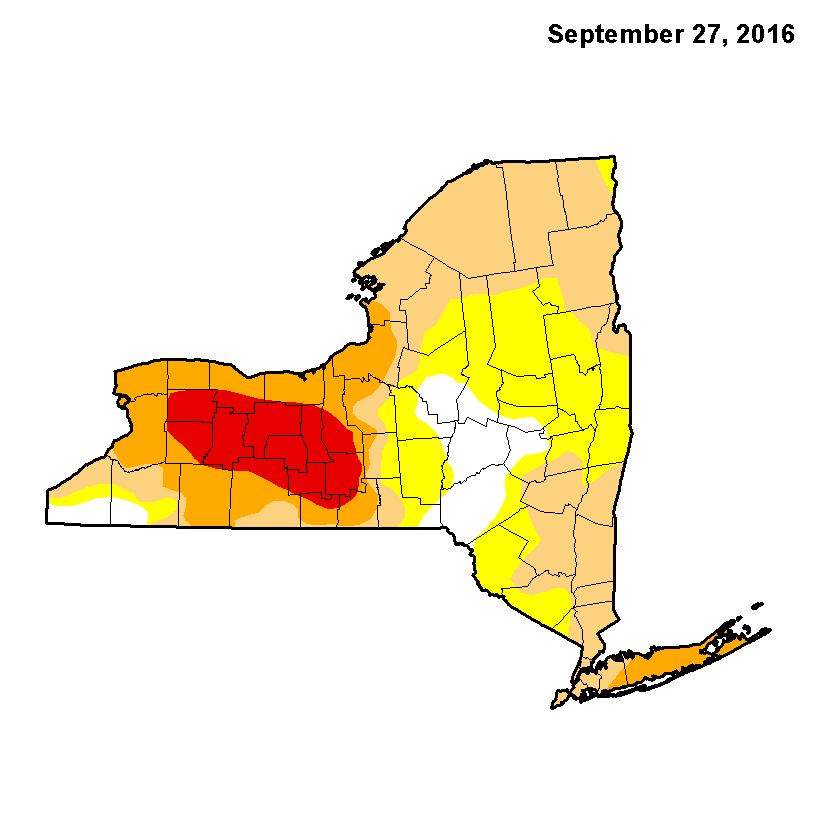
September 27 Drought Monitor report showing identical D-4 patch.

On August 8, a tropical system featuring high humidity and moisture was forecast to bring several inches of rain to Upstate New York over several days from Wednesday through the weekend, including enough moisture to produce up to two inches on the first day. The August 11 drought monitor report (valid up to Tuesday August 9) showed the area of severe drought increasing to 29.5%, covering nearly all of the state from Syracuse west and again setting a weekly report record, though it did not account for widespread rainfall of one half to two inches that took place on Wednesday August 10. Nonetheless, the drought continued as many locations were at a nearly 10 inch deficit for the year. The August 16 drought monitor report showed that while the severe drought area declined slightly, six percent of the state was upgraded to D3 (Extreme Drought), a first for the state during the summer (about 3% of state around New York City saw D3 drought in spring 2002) The area was a long narrow strip from Lake Erie to the northern half of Seneca County, roughly along the I-90 corridor, as well as a spot in the southern Finger Lakes. The Extreme Drought area remained the same for the next two weeks, other than the removal of the western fringe in Erie County. Keuka Lake neared it record low summer level of 713.25 ft (217.4 meters).

The September 6 report saw the D3 Extreme Drought area double to nearly 10% of the state, with the main area and spot to the southeast being connected. Also during this time (August 29), the United States Department of Agriculture designated 15 New York counties as drought disaster areas, qualifying some local farmers for low interest loans. The counties are Cayuga, Chemung, Erie, Genesee, Livingston, Monroe, Niagara, Ontario, Schuyler, Seneca, Steuben, Tioga, Tompkins, Wyoming and Yates. Some surrounding counties were also eligible for the loans, available for eight months after August 29. In all about 18,000 farms covering 3.7 million acres are eligible for the funding when four related drought counties in Pennsylvania are included. New York State and agricultural representatives toured drought-stricken areas in early September. They included Senator Tom O'Mara, Senator Patty Ritchie New York State Department of Agriculture Commissioner Richard Ball.

In combination with also being one of the warmest summers in the area, including a sunny June and July and the hottest August on record for Rochester, the drought was worse than rainfall data would suggest, making it possibly the worst drought on modern record when the two factors were considered together.

== Fall ==
The drought continued through the middle of October, with about 5% of the state in the Finger Lakes still under D-3 Extreme Drought as of October 18. However, a several day pattern of rainy weather later that week dropped up to 6 inches (150 mm) of rain in some areas, and several inches over much of the affected central New York area. The record rainfall effectively quelled the severe drought at least at surface level; however, the vast majority of the state remained "abnormally dry" or "moderate drought", with the Finger Lakes region and Western New York, as well as downstate, still in a substantial drought. The drought at this point was expected to last through January. After the first week of November, about 80% of the state was considered to be in a moderate drought, and about 23% in a D-2 Severe Drought, mainly in the southeastern Finger Lakes and downstate and central Long Island areas. By the mid November report, parts of the Hudson Valley were back into D-3 Extreme Drought category, as part of an ongoing drought in the tri-state (New York-New Jersey-Connecticut) New York metropolitan area that was also expected to last through winter.

== Winter ==
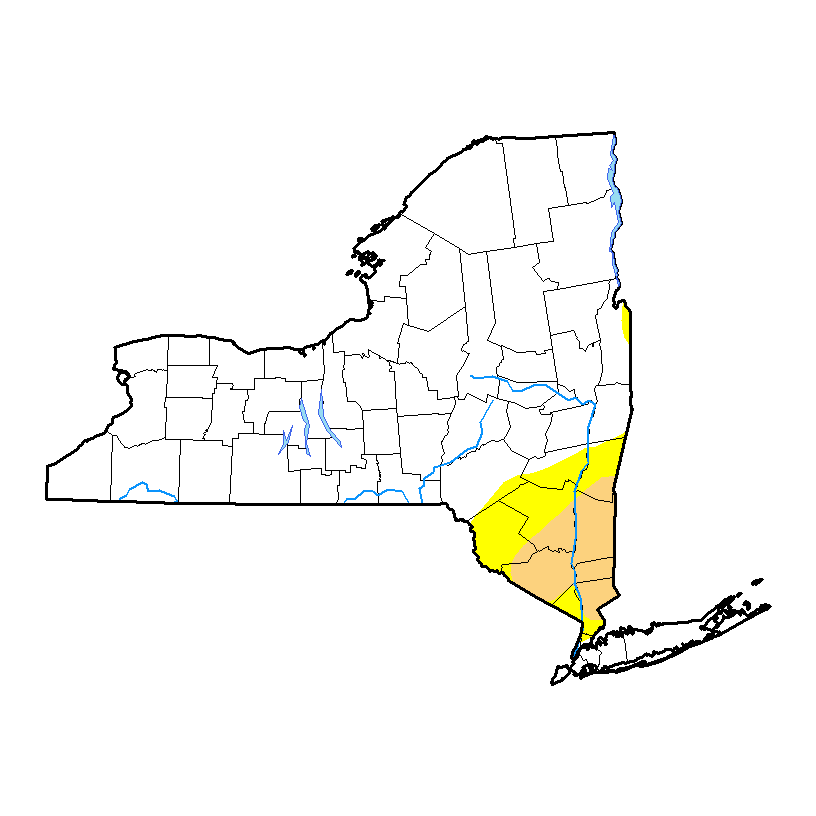
April 4, 2017

Early winter in western New York saw several snowstorms as well as several inches of rain, though according to the drought monitor, much of the region where the drought was worst was still classified as abnormally dry or even moderate drought, though topsoil conditions were soggy. The Cheektowaga office of the National Weather Service reported an above average 6.17 inches of rain from December first to mid January, but snowfall was about ten inches short at 33 inches for the same period. The winter went on to be one of the warmest on record, with below average snowfall, but plenty of rainfall, effectively ending the drought in western New York. The drought was officially announced to be over in March 2017. The next spring went on to be one of the wettest on record in the northeast, causing Lake Ontario to hit record high levels. Buffalo, New York hit record high rainfall totals in April.

== Conclusion ==
Results from a survey of over 200 farmers released in 2017 showed that over two thirds of un-irrigated fields had losses between 30 and 90 percent. Even irrigated crops had losses up to a third. Longer frost-free growing seasons and warmer temperatures create the need for increased rainfall to balance water loss. For legal and disaster loan purposes, the drought officially began on July 12, 2016 and included the counties of Allegany, Broome, Cattaraugus, Cayuga, Chautauqua, Chenango, Cortland, Erie, Genesee, Livingston, Madison, Monroe, Niagara, Onondaga, Orleans, Oswego, Steuben, Tioga, Tompkins and Wyoming. The drought was the most intense short duration drought since an 18-month drought in the early 30s.

== See also ==
2024 Northeastern United States wildfires
