= Climate of New York (state) =

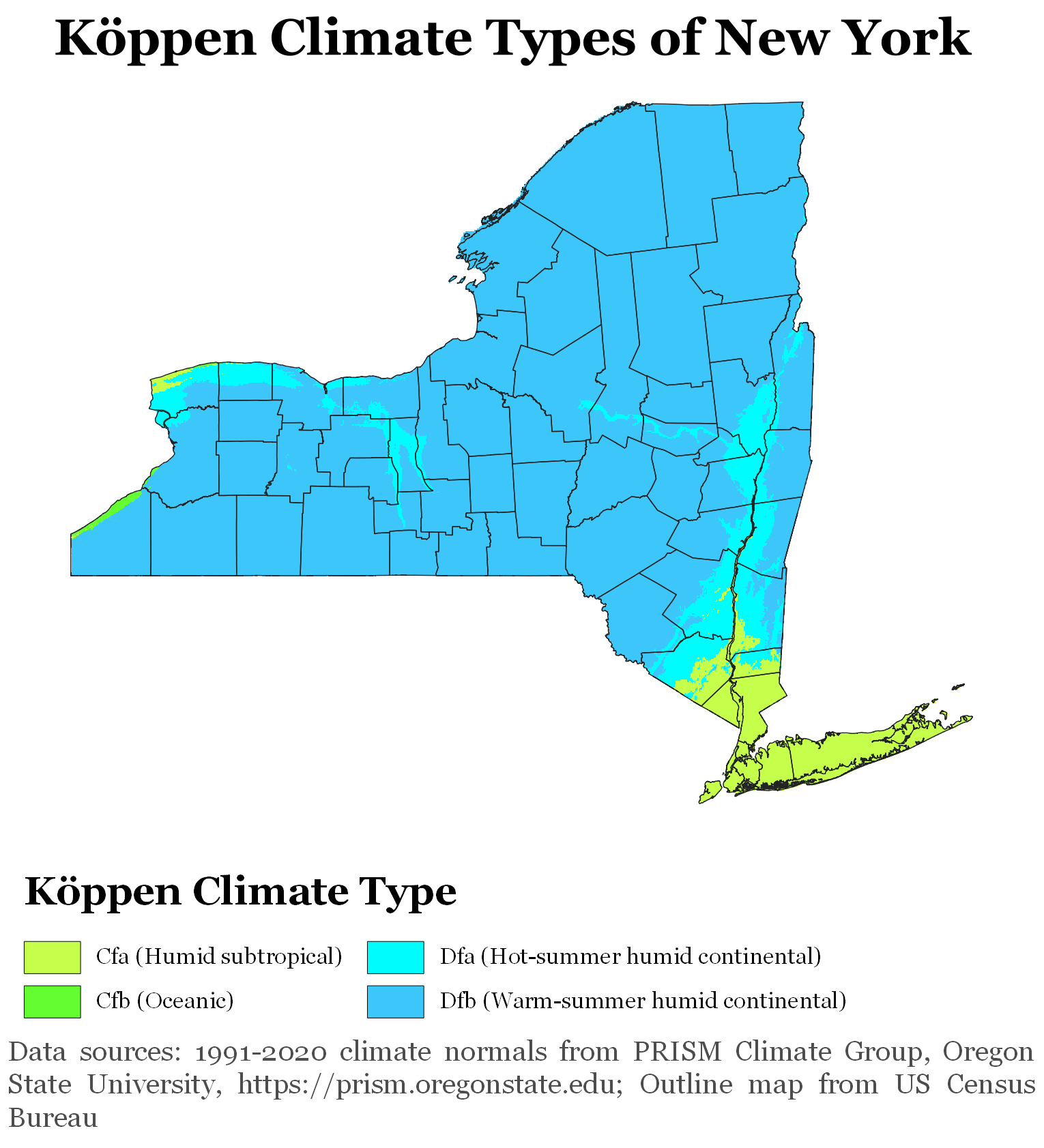
Köppen climate types of New York, using 1991-2020 climate normals and using −3 °C (27 °F) isotherm to distinguish C and D climate zones.

Lake effect snow bands over Upstate New York

The climate of New York (state) is humid continental in upstate areas, transitioning to the warmer humid subtropical climate zone in the New York City metropolitan area. Winter temperatures average below freezing during January and February in much of the state of New York, but several degrees above freezing along the Atlantic coastline, including New York City and Long Island.

Seasonally, summer-like conditions prevail from May to early September statewide, while areas in far southern New York and New York City have summer conditions from late May through early-mid October. Due to frequent stormy weather and Lake Effect precipitation, the area of New York near the Great Lakes is much more cloudy than southernmost New York and Long Island. Winter-like conditions prevail from November through April in northern New York, and from December through March in southern New York. Greenhouse gas emission is low on a per-capita basis when compared to most other states due to the extensive use of mass transit, particularly across New York City. The significant urbanization within New York City has led to an urban heat island, which causes temperatures to be warmer overnight in all seasons.

Annual precipitation is fairly even throughout the year across the state of New York. The Great Lakes region of New York sees the highest annual rain and snow amounts in the state of New York, and heavy lake-effect snow is common in both western and central New York in winter. In the hotter months, large, long-lived complexes of thunderstorms can invade the state from points to the west, while tropical cyclones can bring rains and winds from the south during the summer and fall. Hurricane impacts on the state occur once every 15 years, with major hurricane impacts every 35 years. An average of ten tornadoes touch down in New York annually. Governors Island, Manhattan, in New York Harbor, is planned to host a US$1 billion research and education center poised to make New York City the global leader in addressing the climate crisis.

== Temperatures ==
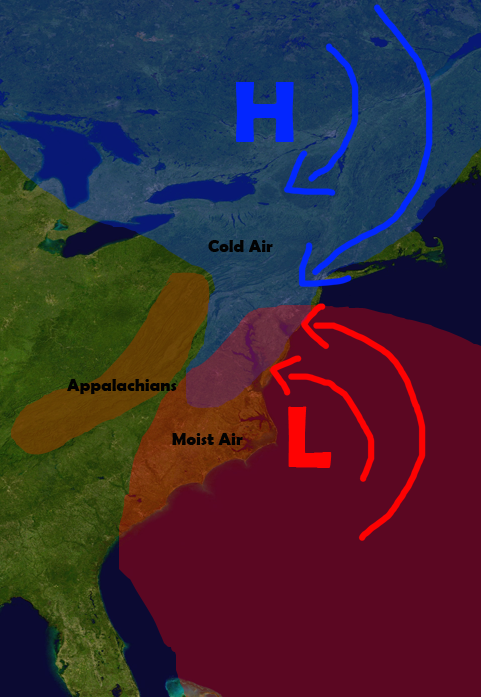
A high pressure system in Canada surges the air southward into the oncoming storm system, creating the potential for heavy wintry precipitation anywhere the cold and moist air masses meet, when it is sufficiently cold.

The annual average temperature across the state ranges from around 39 °F (4 °C) over the Adirondack Mountains to near 53 °F (12 °C) across the Hudson Valley and Long Island, to around 56 °F (13 °C) within New York City. Weather in New York is heavily influenced by two air masses: a warm, humid one from the southwest and a cold, dry one from the northwest. A cool, humid northeast airflow from the North Atlantic is much less common, and results in a persistent cloud deck with associated precipitation which linger across the region for prolonged periods of time. Temperature differences between the warmer coast and far northern inland sections can exceed 36 degrees Fahrenheit (20 degrees Celsius), with rain near the coast and frozen precipitation, such as sleet and freezing rain, falling inland. Two-thirds of such events occur between November and April. which moves from northeast to southwest.

Unlike the vast majority of the state, New York City features a humid subtropical climate (Koppen Cfa). New York City is an urban heat island, with temperatures 5–7 degrees Fahrenheit (3–4 degrees Celsius) warmer overnight than surrounding areas. In an effort to fight this warming, roofs of buildings are being painted white across the city in an effort to increase the reflection of solar energy, or albedo.

=== Summer ===
Summers in New York State significantly vary by region. The summer climate is cooler in the Adirondacks due to higher elevation. The Adirondacks typically experience pleasant dry weather in the summer, with average daily maximum temperatures in the range of 66–73 °F (19–23 °C). Evenings in the Adirondacks are chilly, with average daily minimum temperatures ranging on average between 45–54 °F (7–12 °C). Most of Western New York, Central New York, the mid-Hudson Valley and the Catskills have moderate temperatures but are usually humid, with average maximum temperatures ranging 80–85 °F (27–29 °C).

Nights in central New York state are often muggy, minimums averaging between 61–67 °F (16–19 °C). The New York City area and the Lower Hudson Valley in contrast feature more sultry and tropical summers with frequent and often long lasting bouts of high temperatures and dew points. Average maximum temperatures in this area are usually between 86–90 °F (30–32 °C) but slightly cooler by the ocean and south-facing shorelines of Long Island average closer to 84 °F (29 °C). Nights are warm and muggy, dropping to an average of between 68–75 °F (20–24 °C). The record high for New York state is 108 °F (42 °C), set at Troy on July 22, 1926.

==== Heat waves ====
Heat waves are common in New York State which bring high heat and humidity. Heat waves occurs at least two times each summer and are an average of 3–5 days. Only the Adirondacks does not see oppressive temperatures during most heat waves in New York State. The Adirondacks have warm to hot temperatures with some humidity during a heat wave, but not to the extent of elsewhere in the state.

=== Winter snowfall ===
Snowfall in New York State also significantly varies by region. Lake-effect snow takes place in Western New York and the Adirondacks with Lake Ontario and Lake Erie. Lake-effect snow is very localized and areas may see feet of snow while others see only an inch or none at all. The Adirondacks see the most snowfall because of lake-effect snowfall and higher elevations which see between 250–510 centimeters (100–200 inches) per year and some may see more than 510 centimeters (200 inches) per year, especially western parts of the Adirondacks.

Western and Central New York see between 190–380 centimeters (75–150 inches) per year depending on the location and where the bands hit. The Catskills see an average snowfall, 64–127 centimeters (25–50 inches) and most of it is from nor-easters which are almost always snow. New York City, Long Island, and the Hudson Valley see the least amount of snowfall because they see warmer temperatures from the warmer ocean temperatures and the nor-easters there are mixed with rain, between 25–64 centimeters/250–640 millimeters/10–25 inches.

=== Winter temperatures ===
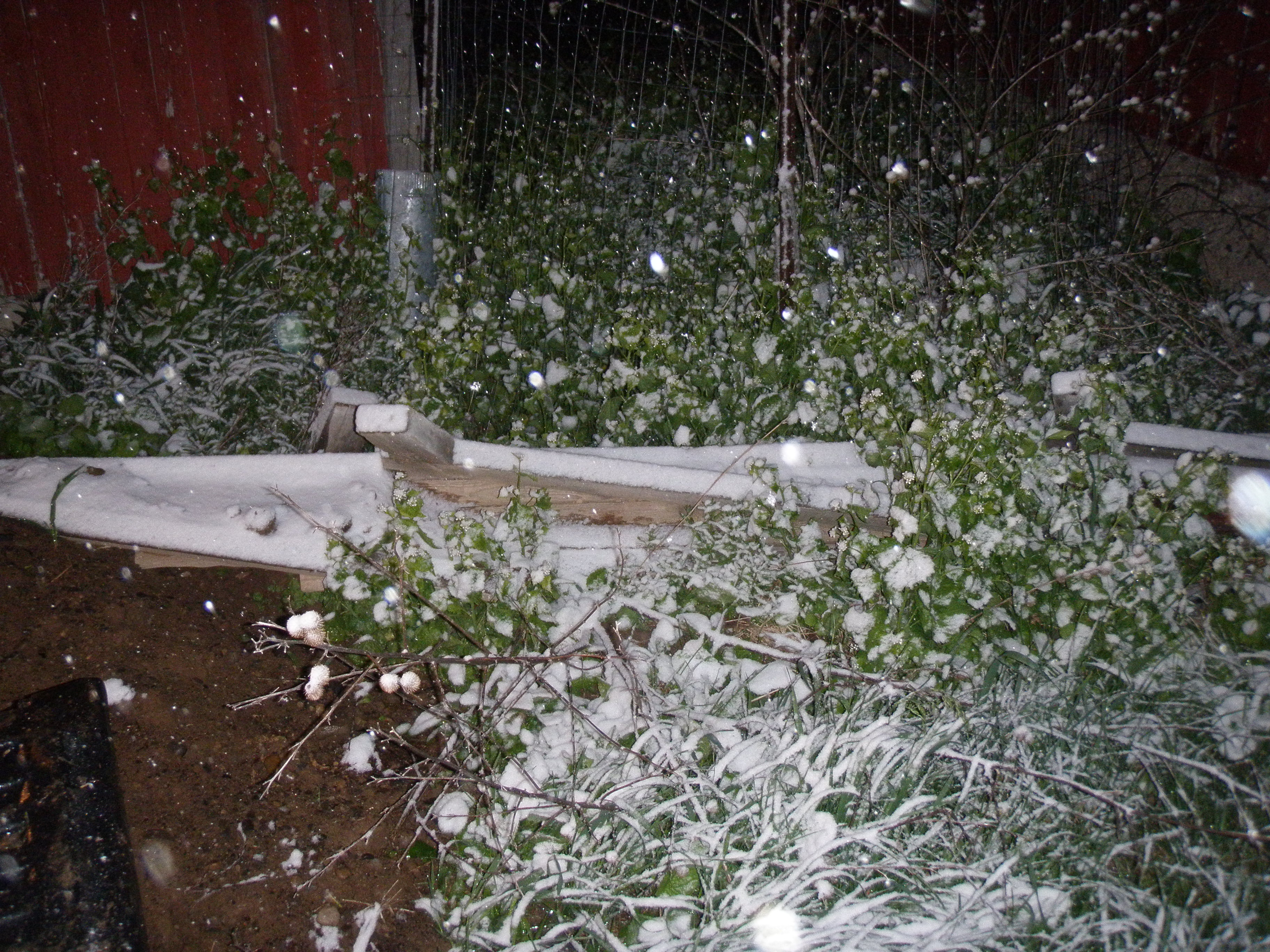
A rare late-season snowfall on May 9, 2010, in Ontario County, Rochester NY MSA

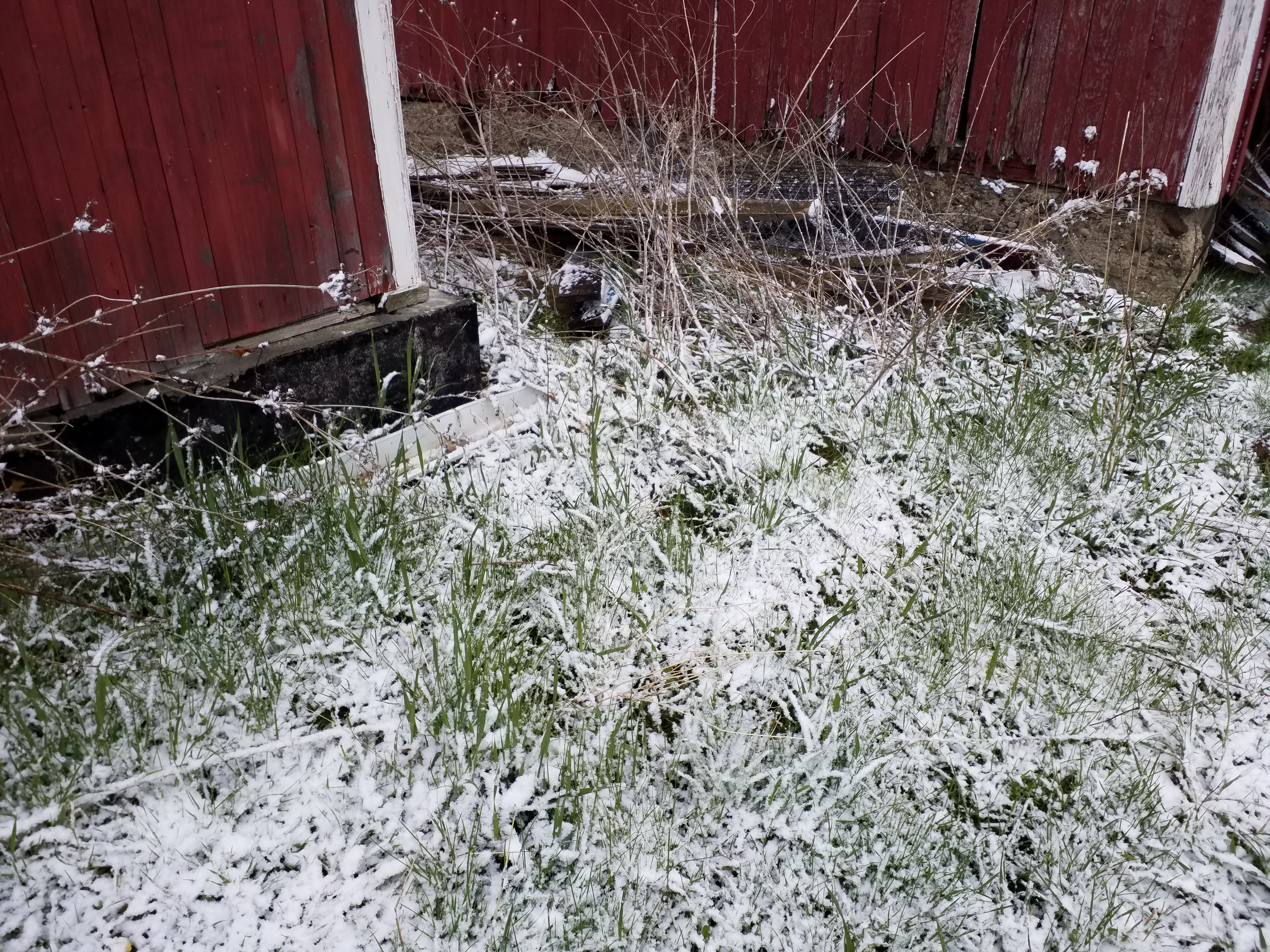
Snow in the same location 10 years later on May 9, 2020

Winter temperatures vary just like the summer temperatures. The Adirondacks are the coldest in New York and are almost always below freezing for almost 3 straight months. The temps are between 18–23 °F (−8 – −5 °C). Nights are cold and frigid, between −2 and 4 °F (−19 and −16 °C). Most of Central New York, Mid Hudson Valley, and the Catskills have moderate temperatures that are not very cold but not mild, Between 30–35 °F (−1–2 °C). Nights are cold but not frigid, between 18–23 °F (−8 – −5 °C).

New York City, Hudson Valley, and Long Island are the warmest in New York State because of warmer ocean temperatures which keep these area between 37–42 °F (3–6 °C), warmer than locations upstate. Downstate nights typically range between 27 and 31 °F. The record low for New York state is −52 °F (−47 °C), set at Stillwater Reservoir on February 9, 1934, and at Old Forge on February 18, 1979. In February 2015, Rochester experienced its coldest month ever, with an average temperature of 12.2 °F (−11 °C). Later, 2015 had a near-record warm November and a record-breaking December. December 2015 was about 12 degrees F warmer than average, and several degrees over the previous record.

=== Records ===
Event	Measurement	Date	Location	County
Highest temperature	108 °F (42.2 °C)	July 22, 1926	Troy	Rensselaer
Lowest temperature	−52 °F (−46.7 °C)	February 18, 1979	Old Forge	Herkimer
Lowest temperature	−52 °F (−46.7 °C)	February 9, 1934	Stillwater Reservoir	Herkimer

== Plant hardiness growing zones ==
New York State growing seasons have significant variations depending on the region. The Adirondacks, which encompasses hardiness zones 3 to 4, have the shortest growing season. Central New York, Western New York, the Catskills, and Mid-Hudson Valley encompass growing zones 5 to 6 and have much longer growing seasons and therefore more agriculture. Lower Hudson Valley, New York City, and Long Island, in growing zones 6 to 7, have the longest growing season in the state, and some areas of New York City, encompass growing zone 8, with it being due to the impact of the Atlantic and the urban heat island effect.

== Cloudiness ==
Southeastern sections of the state near New York City have an average annual cloud cover of 59-62%, while areas of western New York around Buffalo average 71–75% cloud cover annually.

== Precipitation ==
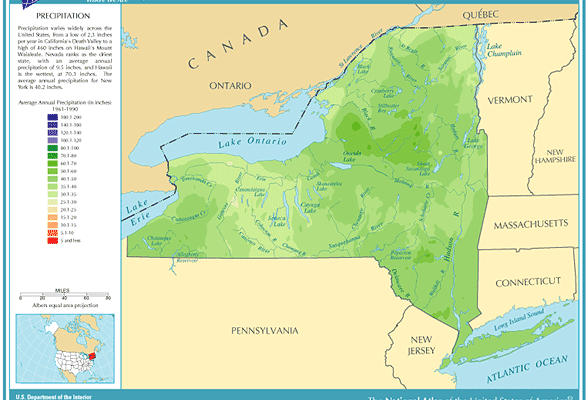
The annual average precipitation for New York state

Average precipitation across the region show maxima within the mountains of the Appalachians. Between 28 and 62 inches (710 and 1,570 mm) of precipitation falls annually across the Northeastern United States, and New York's averages are similar, with maxima of over 60 inches (1,500 mm) falling across southwestern Lewis County, northern Oneida County, central and southern Hamilton County, as well as northwestern Ulster County. The lowest amounts occur near the northern borders with Vermont and Ontario, as well as much of southwestern sections of the state. Temporally, a maximum in precipitation is seen around three peak times: 3 a.m., 10 a.m., and 6 p.m. During the summer, the 6 p.m. peak is most pronounced.

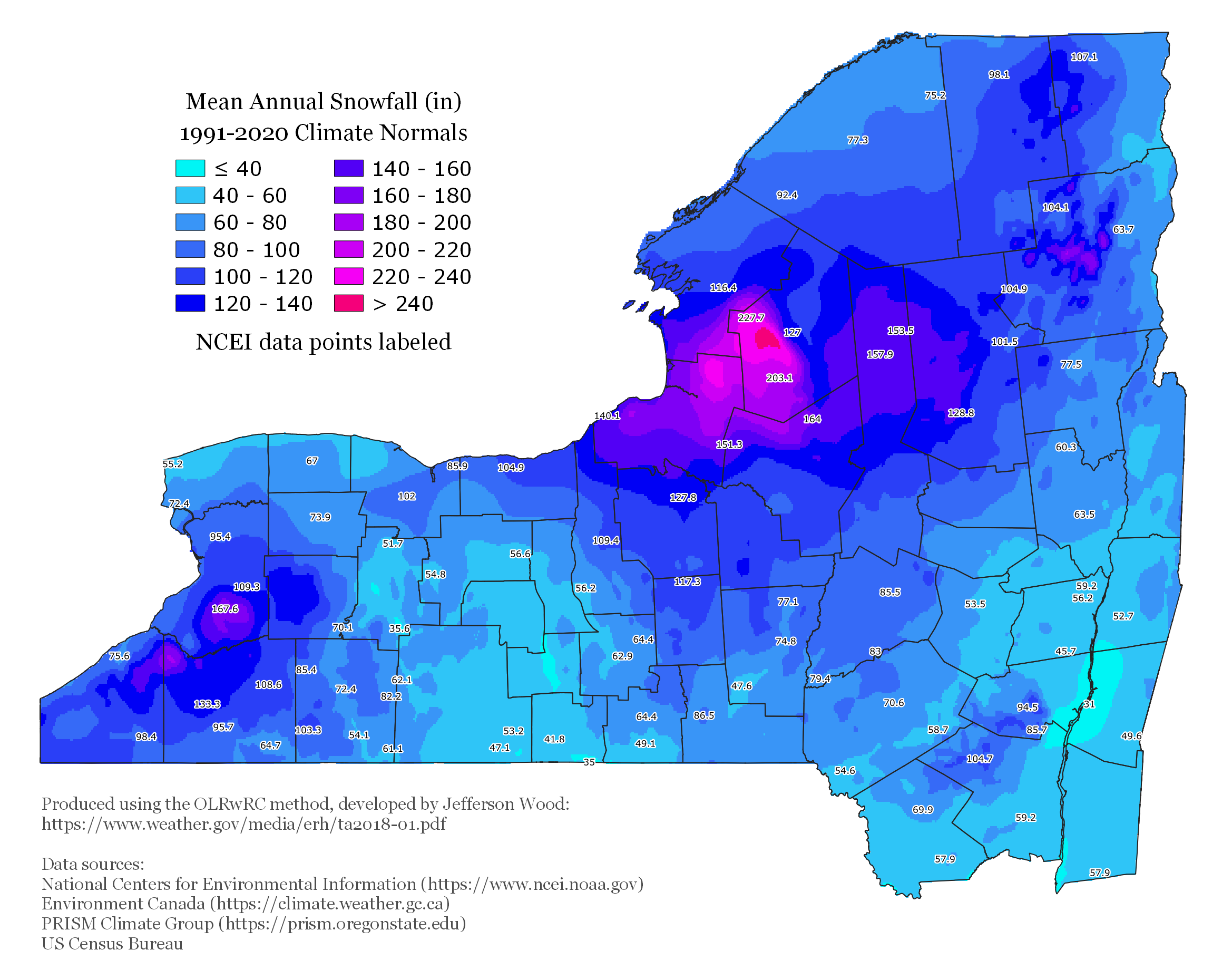
Mean annual snowfall (in inches) for Upstate New York, using 1991-2020 climate normals. Snowfall is especially prevalent within the lake-effect snowbelts of western and north central New York.

Coastal extratropical cyclones, known as nor'easters, bring a bulk of the wintry precipitation to the region during the cold season as they track parallel to the coastline, forming along the natural temperature gradient of the Gulf Stream before moving up the coastline. The Appalachian Mountains largely shield New York City from picking up any lake-effect snow, which develops in the wake of extratropical cyclones downwind of the Great Lakes. The Finger Lakes of New York are long enough for lake-effect precipitation. Lake-effect snow from the Finger Lakes (like elsewhere) occurs in upstate New York until those lakes freeze over. Annual average lake-effect snows exceed 150 inches (380 cm) downwind of Lake Erie and 200 inches (510 cm) downwind of Lake Ontario.

During the summer and early fall, mesoscale convective systems can move into the area from Canada and the Great Lakes. Tropical cyclones and their remains occasionally move into the region from the south and southwest. The region has experienced a couple heavy rainfall events that exceeded the 50-year return period, during October 1996 and October 1998, which suggest an increase in heavy rainfall along the coast.

=== Records ===
Event	Measurement	Date	Location	County
Greatest 24-hour precipitation	13.57 inches (345 mm)	August 12–13, 2014	Islip	Suffolk
Greatest 24-hour snowfall (Note: An unofficial, but widely accepted record 24-hr snowfall of 54 inches was observed at Tug Hill Plateau in January 1976.)	50 inches (130 cm)	January 31, 1966	Camden	Oneida
Greatest snow depth	119 inches (300 cm)	April 20, 1943	Whiteface Mountain	Essex County

== Air pollution ==
In terms of emissions, New York ranks 46th among the 50 states in the amount of greenhouse gases generated per person. This efficiency is primarily due to the state's higher rate of mass transit use in and around New York City.

However, New York City (particularly Manhattan) has extremely high rates of air pollution, with high particle pollution and high cancer rates, which can be explained by extreme population density, despite low per-capita emissions rates.

== Severe weather ==
New York experiences an average of ten tornadoes per year, with one tornado every five years considered strong or violent (EF2-EF5). The return period for hurricane impacts on the state is 18–19 years, with major hurricane return periods between 70 and 74 years. In 2016, much of New York experienced a severe drought, including the Finger Lakes region, where the drought was preceded by a very mild winter with minimal snow pack.

== Climate data for select cities ==
Climate data for Albany International Airport, New York (1991–2020 normals, (Note: Mean monthly maxima and minima (i.e. the expected highest and lowest temperature readings at any point during the year or given month) calculated based on data at said location from 1991 to 2020.) extremes 1874–present (Note: Official records for Albany kept January 1874 to May 1938 at downtown and at Albany Int'l since June 1938. For more information, see Threadex))
Month	Jan	Feb	Mar	Apr	May	Jun	Jul	Aug	Sep	Oct	Nov	Dec	Year
Record high °F (°C)	71 (22)	74 (23)	89 (32)	93 (34)	97 (36)	100 (38)	104 (40)	102 (39)	100 (38)	91 (33)	82 (28)	72 (22)	104 (40)
Mean maximum °F (°C)	54.5 (12.5)	54.5 (12.5)	65.9 (18.8)	80.9 (27.2)	87.8 (31.0)	92.0 (33.3)	92.7 (33.7)	90.6 (32.6)	87.0 (30.6)	77.8 (25.4)	67.7 (19.8)	56.4 (13.6)	94.5 (34.7)
Mean daily maximum °F (°C)	32.8 (0.4)	36.0 (2.2)	45.3 (7.4)	59.2 (15.1)	71.2 (21.8)	79.4 (26.3)	83.9 (28.8)	82.0 (27.8)	74.4 (23.6)	61.6 (16.4)	49.3 (9.6)	38.2 (3.4)	59.4 (15.2)
Daily mean °F (°C)	24.4 (−4.2)	26.8 (−2.9)	35.7 (2.1)	48.1 (8.9)	59.6 (15.3)	68.4 (20.2)	73.1 (22.8)	71.4 (21.9)	63.5 (17.5)	51.4 (10.8)	40.5 (4.7)	30.4 (−0.9)	49.4 (9.7)
Mean daily minimum °F (°C)	15.9 (−8.9)	17.6 (−8.0)	26.1 (−3.3)	36.9 (2.7)	48.1 (8.9)	57.4 (14.1)	62.4 (16.9)	60.7 (15.9)	52.6 (11.4)	41.1 (5.1)	31.6 (−0.2)	22.7 (−5.2)	39.4 (4.1)
Mean minimum °F (°C)	−6.0 (−21.1)	−2.4 (−19.1)	7.8 (−13.4)	23.7 (−4.6)	33.8 (1.0)	43.3 (6.3)	51.5 (10.8)	48.9 (9.4)	37.6 (3.1)	27.0 (−2.8)	16.0 (−8.9)	4.6 (−15.2)	−8.4 (−22.4)
Record low °F (°C)	−28 (−33)	−22 (−30)	−21 (−29)	9 (−13)	26 (−3)	35 (2)	40 (4)	34 (1)	24 (−4)	16 (−9)	−11 (−24)	−22 (−30)	−28 (−33)
Average precipitation inches (mm)	2.60 (66)	2.28 (58)	3.09 (78)	3.11 (79)	3.41 (87)	4.05 (103)	4.55 (116)	3.76 (96)	3.73 (95)	3.85 (98)	2.99 (76)	3.26 (83)	40.68 (1,033)
Average snowfall inches (cm)	15.6 (40)	13.7 (35)	12.0 (30)	1.6 (4.1)	0.1 (0.25)	0.0 (0.0)	0.0 (0.0)	0.0 (0.0)	0.0 (0.0)	0.3 (0.76)	2.6 (6.6)	13.3 (34)	59.2 (150)
Average extreme snow depth inches (cm)	8.3 (21)	8.3 (21)	8.0 (20)	1.1 (2.8)	0.0 (0.0)	0.0 (0.0)	0.0 (0.0)	0.0 (0.0)	0.0 (0.0)	0.2 (0.51)	1.3 (3.3)	7.0 (18)	13.6 (35)
Average precipitation days (≥ 0.01 in)	12.7	10.6	11.8	12.2	12.7	12.2	11.4	11.0	9.7	11.2	11.1	12.6	139.2
Average snowy days (≥ 0.1 in)	10.1	7.8	5.7	1.3	0.0	0.0	0.0	0.0	0.0	0.2	2.4	7.0	34.5
Average relative humidity (%)	71.1	68.5	64.8	61.2	65.5	69.5	70.5	74.1	75.7	72.4	73.1	73.9	70.0
Average dew point °F (°C)	12.9 (−10.6)	14.5 (−9.7)	22.6 (−5.2)	32.2 (0.1)	45.0 (7.2)	55.0 (12.8)	60.3 (15.7)	59.4 (15.2)	52.3 (11.3)	40.3 (4.6)	31.1 (−0.5)	19.4 (−7.0)	37.1 (2.8)
Mean monthly sunshine hours	141.1	158.5	200.3	218.9	248.9	262.2	289.2	253.2	210.5	168.8	108.3	100.7	2,360.6
Percentage possible sunshine	48	54	54	54	55	57	62	59	56	49	38	34	53
Average ultraviolet index	1	2	4	5	7	8	8	7	6	3	2	1	5
Source 1: NOAA (relative humidity, dew point, and sun 1961–1990)
Source 2: Weather Atlas

Climate data for Buffalo (Buffalo Niagara International Airport), 1991–2020 normals, (Note: Mean monthly maxima and minima (i.e. the expected highest and lowest temperature readings at any point during the year or given month) calculated based on data at said location from 1991 to 2020.) extremes 1871–present (Note: Official records for Buffalo kept January 1871 to June 1943 at downtown and at Buffalo Niagara Int'l since July 1943. For more information, see Threadex)
Month	Jan	Feb	Mar	Apr	May	Jun	Jul	Aug	Sep	Oct	Nov	Dec	Year
Record high °F (°C)	72 (22)	71 (22)	82 (28)	94 (34)	94 (34)	97 (36)	98 (37)	99 (37)	98 (37)	92 (33)	80 (27)	74 (23)	99 (37)
Mean maximum °F (°C)	56.4 (13.6)	54.5 (12.5)	66.0 (18.9)	77.9 (25.5)	84.3 (29.1)	88.1 (31.2)	89.5 (31.9)	88.5 (31.4)	86.4 (30.2)	77.9 (25.5)	67.4 (19.7)	56.8 (13.8)	91.5 (33.1)
Mean daily maximum °F (°C)	32.1 (0.1)	33.3 (0.7)	41.8 (5.4)	54.7 (12.6)	67.4 (19.7)	75.6 (24.2)	80.2 (26.8)	79.0 (26.1)	72.3 (22.4)	59.6 (15.3)	47.8 (8.8)	37.2 (2.9)	56.8 (13.8)
Daily mean °F (°C)	25.5 (−3.6)	26.4 (−3.1)	34.1 (1.2)	45.6 (7.6)	57.9 (14.4)	66.9 (19.4)	71.7 (22.1)	70.4 (21.3)	63.4 (17.4)	51.7 (10.9)	41.0 (5.0)	31.4 (−0.3)	48.8 (9.3)
Mean daily minimum °F (°C)	19.0 (−7.2)	19.5 (−6.9)	26.4 (−3.1)	36.5 (2.5)	48.3 (9.1)	58.1 (14.5)	63.1 (17.3)	61.7 (16.5)	54.5 (12.5)	43.9 (6.6)	34.2 (1.2)	25.6 (−3.6)	40.9 (4.9)
Mean minimum °F (°C)	0.8 (−17.3)	1.7 (−16.8)	9.3 (−12.6)	24.6 (−4.1)	35.6 (2.0)	45.6 (7.6)	52.8 (11.6)	51.0 (10.6)	41.0 (5.0)	30.7 (−0.7)	20.4 (−6.4)	8.5 (−13.1)	−2.8 (−19.3)
Record low °F (°C)	−16 (−27)	−20 (−29)	−7 (−22)	5 (−15)	25 (−4)	35 (2)	43 (6)	38 (3)	32 (0)	20 (−7)	2 (−17)	−10 (−23)	−20 (−29)
Average precipitation inches (mm)	3.35 (85)	2.49 (63)	2.89 (73)	3.37 (86)	3.37 (86)	3.37 (86)	3.23 (82)	3.23 (82)	4.10 (104)	4.03 (102)	3.50 (89)	3.75 (95)	40.68 (1,033)
Average snowfall inches (cm)	26.7 (68)	18.1 (46)	14.1 (36)	2.5 (6.4)	0.0 (0.0)	0.0 (0.0)	0.0 (0.0)	0.0 (0.0)	0.0 (0.0)	0.9 (2.3)	7.8 (20)	25.3 (64)	95.4 (242)
Average extreme snow depth inches (cm)	10.8 (27)	8.4 (21)	7.6 (19)	1.0 (2.5)	0.0 (0.0)	0.0 (0.0)	0.0 (0.0)	0.0 (0.0)	0.0 (0.0)	0.1 (0.25)	3.7 (9.4)	9.0 (23)	15.5 (39)
Average precipitation days (≥ 0.01 in)	19.2	15.8	14.8	13.4	12.8	11.9	10.8	10.0	10.9	14.1	14.4	17.7	165.8
Average snowy days (≥ 0.1 in)	16.4	13.5	9.1	3.2	0.0	0.0	0.0	0.0	0.0	0.4	4.7	12.2	59.5
Average relative humidity (%)	76.0	75.9	73.3	67.8	67.2	68.6	68.1	72.1	74.0	72.9	75.8	77.6	72.4
Average dew point °F (°C)	16.9 (−8.4)	17.6 (−8.0)	25.2 (−3.8)	33.4 (0.8)	44.2 (6.8)	54.1 (12.3)	59.0 (15.0)	58.8 (14.9)	52.5 (11.4)	41.7 (5.4)	32.7 (0.4)	22.6 (−5.2)	38.2 (3.5)
Mean monthly sunshine hours	91.3	108.0	163.7	204.7	258.3	287.1	306.7	266.4	207.6	159.4	84.4	69.0	2,206.6
Percentage possible sunshine	31	37	44	51	57	63	66	62	55	47	29	25	49
Average ultraviolet index	1	2	4	6	7	8	8	8	6	4	2	1	5
Source 1: NOAA (relative humidity and sun 1961–1990)
Source 2: Weather Atlas

Climate data for Islip, New York (Long Island MacArthur Airport), 1991–2020 normals, (Note: Mean monthly maxima and minima (i.e. the expected highest and lowest temperature readings at any point during the year or given month) calculated based on data at said location from 1991 to 2020.) extremes 1963–present
Month	Jan	Feb	Mar	Apr	May	Jun	Jul	Aug	Sep	Oct	Nov	Dec	Year
Record high °F (°C)	69 (21)	71 (22)	82 (28)	94 (34)	98 (37)	101 (38)	104 (40)	100 (38)	94 (34)	89 (32)	80 (27)	77 (25)	104 (40)
Mean maximum °F (°C)	58.2 (14.6)	57.1 (13.9)	66.7 (19.3)	77.0 (25.0)	85.8 (29.9)	90.4 (32.4)	94.0 (34.4)	91.2 (32.9)	86.0 (30.0)	78.6 (25.9)	68.8 (20.4)	60.9 (16.1)	95.6 (35.3)
Mean daily maximum °F (°C)	39.2 (4.0)	41.0 (5.0)	47.7 (8.7)	58.3 (14.6)	68.3 (20.2)	77.2 (25.1)	82.8 (28.2)	81.4 (27.4)	74.8 (23.8)	64.1 (17.8)	53.6 (12.0)	44.4 (6.9)	61.1 (16.2)
Daily mean °F (°C)	31.9 (−0.1)	33.3 (0.7)	39.9 (4.4)	49.7 (9.8)	59.5 (15.3)	69.0 (20.6)	75.0 (23.9)	73.7 (23.2)	66.9 (19.4)	55.7 (13.2)	45.6 (7.6)	37.1 (2.8)	53.1 (11.7)
Mean daily minimum °F (°C)	24.6 (−4.1)	25.5 (−3.6)	32.0 (0.0)	41.2 (5.1)	50.8 (10.4)	60.9 (16.1)	67.3 (19.6)	66.0 (18.9)	58.9 (14.9)	47.3 (8.5)	37.6 (3.1)	29.8 (−1.2)	45.2 (7.3)
Mean minimum °F (°C)	7.4 (−13.7)	9.8 (−12.3)	17.0 (−8.3)	28.8 (−1.8)	37.9 (3.3)	48.4 (9.1)	57.7 (14.3)	55.7 (13.2)	45.4 (7.4)	33.0 (0.6)	22.9 (−5.1)	15.8 (−9.0)	5.4 (−14.8)
Record low °F (°C)	−8 (−22)	−14 (−26)	0 (−18)	16 (−9)	32 (0)	42 (6)	49 (9)	45 (7)	38 (3)	23 (−5)	11 (−12)	−1 (−18)	−14 (−26)
Average precipitation inches (mm)	3.66 (93)	3.29 (84)	4.51 (115)	4.06 (103)	3.28 (83)	4.00 (102)	3.26 (83)	4.24 (108)	3.60 (91)	3.97 (101)	3.41 (87)	4.71 (120)	45.99 (1,168)
Average snowfall inches (cm)	10.3 (26)	9.4 (24)	6.5 (17)	0.6 (1.5)	0.0 (0.0)	0.0 (0.0)	0.0 (0.0)	0.0 (0.0)	0.0 (0.0)	0.0 (0.0)	0.5 (1.3)	4.5 (11)	31.8 (81)
Average extreme snow depth inches (cm)	6.6 (17)	6.4 (16)	3.7 (9.4)	0.5 (1.3)	0.0 (0.0)	0.0 (0.0)	0.0 (0.0)	0.0 (0.0)	0.0 (0.0)	0.0 (0.0)	0.2 (0.51)	3.0 (7.6)	11.3 (29)
Average precipitation days (≥ 0.01 in)	11.1	9.9	10.8	11.3	11.6	10.1	9.1	8.9	8.6	9.2	9.6	11.8	122.0
Average snowy days (≥ 0.1 in)	3.8	3.7	2.7	0.3	0.0	0.0	0.0	0.0	0.0	0.0	0.3	2.6	13.4
Source: NOAA

Climate data for New York (Belvedere Castle, Central Park), 1991–2020 normals, (Note: Mean monthly maxima and minima (i.e. the expected highest and lowest temperature readings at any point during the year or given month) calculated based on data at said location from 1991 to 2020.) extremes 1869–present (Note: Official weather observations for Central Park were conducted at the Arsenal at Fifth Avenue and 64th Street from 1869 to 1919, and at Belvedere Castle since 1919.)
Month	Jan	Feb	Mar	Apr	May	Jun	Jul	Aug	Sep	Oct	Nov	Dec	Year
Record high °F (°C)	72 (22)	78 (26)	86 (30)	96 (36)	99 (37)	101 (38)	106 (41)	104 (40)	102 (39)	94 (34)	84 (29)	75 (24)	106 (41)
Mean maximum °F (°C)	60.4 (15.8)	60.7 (15.9)	70.3 (21.3)	82.9 (28.3)	88.5 (31.4)	92.1 (33.4)	95.7 (35.4)	93.4 (34.1)	89.0 (31.7)	79.7 (26.5)	70.7 (21.5)	62.9 (17.2)	97.0 (36.1)
Mean daily maximum °F (°C)	39.5 (4.2)	42.2 (5.7)	49.9 (9.9)	61.8 (16.6)	71.4 (21.9)	79.7 (26.5)	84.9 (29.4)	83.3 (28.5)	76.2 (24.6)	64.5 (18.1)	54.0 (12.2)	44.3 (6.8)	62.6 (17.0)
Daily mean °F (°C)	33.7 (0.9)	35.9 (2.2)	42.8 (6.0)	53.7 (12.1)	63.2 (17.3)	72.0 (22.2)	77.5 (25.3)	76.1 (24.5)	69.2 (20.7)	57.9 (14.4)	48.0 (8.9)	39.1 (3.9)	55.8 (13.2)
Mean daily minimum °F (°C)	27.9 (−2.3)	29.5 (−1.4)	35.8 (2.1)	45.5 (7.5)	55.0 (12.8)	64.4 (18.0)	70.1 (21.2)	68.9 (20.5)	62.3 (16.8)	51.4 (10.8)	42.0 (5.6)	33.8 (1.0)	48.9 (9.4)
Mean minimum °F (°C)	9.8 (−12.3)	12.7 (−10.7)	19.7 (−6.8)	32.8 (0.4)	43.9 (6.6)	52.7 (11.5)	61.8 (16.6)	60.3 (15.7)	50.2 (10.1)	38.4 (3.6)	27.7 (−2.4)	18.0 (−7.8)	7.7 (−13.5)
Record low °F (°C)	−6 (−21)	−15 (−26)	3 (−16)	12 (−11)	32 (0)	44 (7)	52 (11)	50 (10)	39 (4)	28 (−2)	5 (−15)	−13 (−25)	−15 (−26)
Average precipitation inches (mm)	3.64 (92)	3.19 (81)	4.29 (109)	4.09 (104)	3.96 (101)	4.54 (115)	4.60 (117)	4.56 (116)	4.31 (109)	4.38 (111)	3.58 (91)	4.38 (111)	49.52 (1,258)
Average snowfall inches (cm)	8.8 (22)	10.1 (26)	5.0 (13)	0.4 (1.0)	0.0 (0.0)	0.0 (0.0)	0.0 (0.0)	0.0 (0.0)	0.0 (0.0)	0.1 (0.25)	0.5 (1.3)	4.9 (12)	29.8 (76)
Average extreme snow depth inches (cm)	5.8 (15)	7.9 (20)	4.4 (11)	0.4 (1.0)	0.0 (0.0)	0.0 (0.0)	0.0 (0.0)	0.0 (0.0)	0.0 (0.0)	0.0 (0.0)	0.4 (1.0)	3.7 (9.4)	12.3 (31)
Average precipitation days (≥ 0.01 in)	10.8	10.0	11.1	11.4	11.5	11.2	10.5	10.0	8.8	9.5	9.2	11.4	125.4
Average snowy days (≥ 0.1 in)	3.7	3.2	2.0	0.2	0.0	0.0	0.0	0.0	0.0	0.0	0.2	2.1	11.4
Average relative humidity (%)	61.5	60.2	58.5	55.3	62.7	65.2	64.2	66.0	67.8	65.6	64.6	64.1	63.0
Average dew point °F (°C)	18.0 (−7.8)	19.0 (−7.2)	25.9 (−3.4)	34.0 (1.1)	47.3 (8.5)	57.4 (14.1)	61.9 (16.6)	62.1 (16.7)	55.6 (13.1)	44.1 (6.7)	34.0 (1.1)	24.6 (−4.1)	40.3 (4.6)
Mean monthly sunshine hours	162.7	163.1	212.5	225.6	256.6	257.3	268.2	268.2	219.3	211.2	151.0	139.0	2,534.7
Percentage possible sunshine	54	55	57	57	57	57	59	63	59	61	51	48	57
Average ultraviolet index	2	3	4	6	7	8	8	8	6	4	2	1	5
Source 1: NOAA (relative humidity and sun 1961–1990; dew point 1965–1984)
Source 2: Weather Atlas.

Sea temperature data for New York
Month	Jan	Feb	Mar	Apr	May	Jun	Jul	Aug	Sep	Oct	Nov	Dec	Year
Average sea temperature °F (°C)	41.7 (5.4)	39.7 (4.3)	40.2 (4.5)	45.1 (7.3)	52.5 (11.4)	64.5 (18.1)	72.1 (22.3)	74.1 (23.4)	70.1 (21.2)	63.0 (17.2)	54.3 (12.4)	47.2 (8.4)	55.4 (13.0)

Climate data for JFK Airport, New York (1991–2020 normals, (Note: Mean monthly maxima and minima (i.e. the expected highest and lowest temperature readings at any point during the year or given month) calculated based on data at said location from 1991 to 2020.) extremes 1948–present)
Month	Jan	Feb	Mar	Apr	May	Jun	Jul	Aug	Sep	Oct	Nov	Dec	Year
Record high °F (°C)	71 (22)	71 (22)	85 (29)	90 (32)	99 (37)	102 (39)	104 (40)	101 (38)	98 (37)	95 (35)	80 (27)	75 (24)	104 (40)
Mean maximum °F (°C)	57.7 (14.3)	58.3 (14.6)	67.5 (19.7)	77.9 (25.5)	85.6 (29.8)	92.4 (33.6)	95.2 (35.1)	91.9 (33.3)	87.9 (31.1)	79.7 (26.5)	68.9 (20.5)	60.6 (15.9)	96.8 (36.0)
Mean daily maximum °F (°C)	39.5 (4.2)	41.7 (5.4)	48.7 (9.3)	58.8 (14.9)	68.4 (20.2)	78.0 (25.6)	83.6 (28.7)	82.2 (27.9)	75.8 (24.3)	64.7 (18.2)	53.8 (12.1)	44.5 (6.9)	61.6 (16.4)
Daily mean °F (°C)	32.8 (0.4)	34.5 (1.4)	41.1 (5.1)	50.9 (10.5)	60.5 (15.8)	70.2 (21.2)	76.1 (24.5)	75.0 (23.9)	68.4 (20.2)	57.2 (14.0)	46.8 (8.2)	38.3 (3.5)	54.3 (12.4)
Mean daily minimum °F (°C)	26.2 (−3.2)	27.4 (−2.6)	33.6 (0.9)	42.9 (6.1)	52.5 (11.4)	62.4 (16.9)	68.7 (20.4)	67.8 (19.9)	61.0 (16.1)	49.8 (9.9)	39.8 (4.3)	32.0 (0.0)	47.0 (8.3)
Mean minimum °F (°C)	10.2 (−12.1)	13.3 (−10.4)	20.2 (−6.6)	32.6 (0.3)	42.9 (6.1)	52.6 (11.4)	62.8 (17.1)	60.1 (15.6)	50.0 (10.0)	37.9 (3.3)	26.9 (−2.8)	18.6 (−7.4)	8.2 (−13.2)
Record low °F (°C)	−2 (−19)	−2 (−19)	7 (−14)	20 (−7)	34 (1)	45 (7)	55 (13)	46 (8)	40 (4)	30 (−1)	15 (−9)	2 (−17)	−2 (−19)
Average precipitation inches (mm)	3.23 (82)	2.76 (70)	3.94 (100)	3.55 (90)	3.66 (93)	3.85 (98)	3.86 (98)	4.11 (104)	3.58 (91)	3.72 (94)	3.07 (78)	3.96 (101)	43.29 (1,100)
Average snowfall inches (cm)	7.5 (19)	8.6 (22)	4.3 (11)	0.6 (1.5)	0.0 (0.0)	0.0 (0.0)	0.0 (0.0)	0.0 (0.0)	0.0 (0.0)	0.0 (0.0)	0.4 (1.0)	4.5 (11)	25.9 (66)
Average precipitation days (≥ 0.01 inch)	10.7	9.8	10.8	11.4	11.8	10.6	9.4	9.0	8.2	9.4	8.9	11.2	121.2
Average snowy days (≥ 0.1 in)	4.6	3.8	2.5	0.3	0.0	0.0	0.0	0.0	0.0	0.0	0.2	2.6	14.0
Average relative humidity (%)	64.9	64.4	63.4	64.1	69.5	71.5	71.4	71.7	71.9	69.1	67.9	66.3	68.0
Source: NOAA (relative humidity 1961–1990)

Climate data for Rochester, New York (Greater Rochester Int'l), 1991–2020 normals, (Note: Mean monthly maxima and minima (i.e. the expected highest and lowest temperature readings at any point during the year or given month) calculated based on data at said location from 1991 to 2020.) extremes 1871−present (Note: Official records for Rochester kept January 1871 to September 1940 at downtown and at Greater Rochester Int'l since October 1940. For more information, see Threadex)
Month	Jan	Feb	Mar	Apr	May	Jun	Jul	Aug	Sep	Oct	Nov	Dec	Year
Record high °F (°C)	74 (23)	73 (23)	86 (30)	93 (34)	94 (34)	100 (38)	102 (39)	99 (37)	99 (37)	91 (33)	81 (27)	72 (22)	102 (39)
Mean maximum °F (°C)	57.2 (14.0)	55.1 (12.8)	67.1 (19.5)	79.9 (26.6)	86.7 (30.4)	90.5 (32.5)	92.1 (33.4)	90.4 (32.4)	87.7 (30.9)	80.0 (26.7)	68.5 (20.3)	57.5 (14.2)	93.4 (34.1)
Mean daily maximum °F (°C)	33.4 (0.8)	35.2 (1.8)	43.6 (6.4)	55.5 (13.1)	69.4 (20.8)	77.9 (25.5)	82.5 (28.1)	80.5 (26.9)	73.6 (23.1)	61.2 (16.2)	49.1 (9.5)	38.5 (3.6)	58.5 (14.7)
Daily mean °F (°C)	26.2 (−3.2)	27.4 (−2.6)	35.2 (1.8)	46.8 (8.2)	58.8 (14.9)	67.6 (19.8)	72.3 (22.4)	70.7 (21.5)	63.6 (17.6)	52.2 (11.2)	41.5 (5.3)	32.0 (0.0)	49.5 (9.7)
Mean daily minimum °F (°C)	19.0 (−7.2)	19.6 (−6.9)	26.8 (−2.9)	37.1 (2.8)	48.2 (9.0)	57.4 (14.1)	62.2 (16.8)	61.0 (16.1)	53.6 (12.0)	43.3 (6.3)	34.0 (1.1)	25.4 (−3.7)	40.6 (4.8)
Mean minimum °F (°C)	−0.8 (−18.2)	0.5 (−17.5)	8.4 (−13.1)	24.1 (−4.4)	34.4 (1.3)	43.9 (6.6)	50.7 (10.4)	49.2 (9.6)	39.6 (4.2)	29.7 (−1.3)	18.6 (−7.4)	7.7 (−13.5)	−3.7 (−19.8)
Record low °F (°C)	−17 (−27)	−22 (−30)	−9 (−23)	7 (−14)	26 (−3)	35 (2)	42 (6)	36 (2)	28 (−2)	19 (−7)	1 (−17)	−16 (−27)	−22 (−30)
Average precipitation inches (mm)	2.55 (65)	2.13 (54)	2.49 (63)	2.99 (76)	2.86 (73)	3.37 (86)	3.56 (90)	3.31 (84)	3.18 (81)	3.22 (82)	2.76 (70)	2.67 (68)	35.09 (891)
Average snowfall inches (cm)	27.4 (70)	23.1 (59)	17.9 (45)	3.0 (7.6)	0.1 (0.25)	0.0 (0.0)	0.0 (0.0)	0.0 (0.0)	0.0 (0.0)	0.1 (0.25)	8.1 (21)	22.3 (57)	102.0 (259)
Average extreme snow depth inches (cm)	9.2 (23)	8.6 (22)	9.3 (24)	1.5 (3.8)	0.0 (0.0)	0.0 (0.0)	0.0 (0.0)	0.0 (0.0)	0.0 (0.0)	0.0 (0.0)	3.3 (8.4)	6.4 (16)	13.8 (35)
Average precipitation days (≥ 0.01 in)	19.6	16.4	15.4	13.4	12.4	11.5	11.2	10.3	11.1	13.9	14.9	18.1	168.2
Average snowy days (≥ 0.1 in)	17.6	15.0	10.1	3.0	0.1	0.0	0.0	0.0	0.0	0.2	5.7	13.5	65.2
Average relative humidity (%)	74.0	74.1	71.0	67.0	67.2	69.4	69.7	74.3	76.8	74.5	76.3	77.5	72.6
Average dew point °F (°C)	16.3 (−8.7)	17.2 (−8.2)	25.0 (−3.9)	34.0 (1.1)	45.1 (7.3)	55.0 (12.8)	59.9 (15.5)	59.7 (15.4)	53.4 (11.9)	42.3 (5.7)	33.3 (0.7)	22.8 (−5.1)	38.7 (3.7)
Mean monthly sunshine hours	108.3	118.1	177.7	216.5	266.5	297.6	314.4	273.4	212.3	154.4	81.5	77.5	2,298.2
Percentage possible sunshine	37	40	48	54	59	65	68	63	57	45	28	28	52
Source: NOAA (relative humidity, dew point, and sun 1961–1990)

== See also ==
- Climate change in New York (state)
- List of New York hurricanes
