= National Drought Policy Commission =

The National Drought Policy Commission was created by the United States National Drought Policy Act of 1998, to conduct a study of current federal, state, local and tribal drought preparedness, and review laws and programs to determine if deficiencies exist in current relief policies and resources. The Commission issued a report to the President and Congress, Preparing for Drought in the 21st Century, May 2000.
