= Francis Child =

Francis Child may refer to:

- Sir Francis Child (died 1713) (1642–1713), English banker and politician
- Sir Francis Child (died 1740) (1684–1740), English banker and politician
- Francis Child (died 1763) (1735–1763), English politician
- Francis James Child (1825–1896), American educator and folklorist
