= Francis Childs (farmer) =

American farmer (1939–2008)

Francis Childs (August 30, 1939 – January 9, 2008) was a hog farmer and champion corn farmer from Manchester, Iowa. He is known for being the first farmer to have corn yields of over 400 bushels per acre in controlled contest plots, achieving that level in 2001 and 2002.

== Family ==
Francis R. Childs was born in Delaware County, Iowa on August 30, 1939. He was the son of Ross and Laura Childs. His father was a farmer, and Francis took over the family farm in Manchester, Iowa in 1966. The farm had been in the family since 1856.

== Champion corn grower ==
His father had entered crop-growing contests and Francis continued the tradition, winning his first Iowa Masters Corn Growers Contest in 1967. He also operated a Polaris snowmobile shop. Francis did not win again until 1990. He again won in 1992, and then a streak of victories from 1994 until 2007, winning Iowa, Nebraska, and national contests over that period. In total, he won the Iowa contest eighteen times, the Nebraska contest - where he had a farm in Falls City - twice, and the National Corn Growers Association prize eight times.

In 1999, his non-irrigated contest plot reached 394 bushels an acre, an achievement which was compared to breaking the sound barrier by an Agricultural Department official present. In 2001, he became the first corn farmer to grow more than 400 bushels in an acre in a controlled contest with 405. He achieved 442 the next year, a record that hadn't been broken as of 2016. He was disqualified from the national corn growers contest in 2003 in part due to cheating accusations from his recently divorced ex-wife, but won three more national championships and five state championships in the next five years. While never breaking his 2002 mark in a contest plot, he claimed to have grown as many as 557 bushels an acre in sections of fields that were smaller than the 10-acre strips required for contest plots. The average yield in 2007 was 153 bushels an acre.

=== Methods ===
Childs' corn was grown for his pig operation and for market. He planted as many as 40,000 seeds an acre on contest plots, compared to 36,000 an acre on his conventional fields. His methods included extensive scouting and care of roots and plants during growing season, running the planter and combine slower to deal with the more dense planting of contest plots, to use a special attachment on the planter to encourage faster germination, and not rotating crops. In 1999, he spent about $650 per acre on contest plots, about twice what he spent on conventional plots.

He also plowed deeper than most farmers (many of whom no longer plow at all), planted genetically modified seeds very densely, used large amounts of chemical fertilizers and pesticides and tested the tissue of plants at different stages of growth. Environmentalists criticized Mr. Childs for his heavy use of chemicals, and deep plowing, which can lead to erosion. Childs published an article length description of his methods in the journal, Better Crops in 2000.
