= Garden Walk Buffalo =

Garden Walk Buffalo is a free, self-guided garden tour of more than 400 Buffalo, New York, USA, residential urban gardens. The event is held annually on the last full weekend of July. The event attracts thousands of visitors from across the U.S. and Canada.

Garden Walk Buffalo extends from the Frederick Law Olmsted-designed Delaware Park to the urban core of Buffalo, New York. Most participating gardens are private, but community spaces, corporate gardens, and religious institutions' gardens are also included. It is noncompetitive, with no prior judging of gardens.

== The organization ==
The work of organizing and managing the event is done by the volunteers of Gardens Buffalo Niagara, a non-profit group. Financial support comes from contributions from participants, visitors, and corporate sponsorships.

Since 2005, Garden Walk Buffalo has provided Neighborhood Beautification grants for community gardening projects within the Garden Walk area. The group produced a Garden Walk Buffalo coffee table book and DVD in 2006, published by Buffalo Heritage Press, which is in its second printing.

== Background ==
In 1993, Buffalo, NY residents Marvin Lunenfeld and Gail McCarthy attended the Sheffield Garden Walk in Chicago, IL and decided it was a concept that could work equally well in Buffalo.

They presented the idea to the members of the Norwood/West Utica Neighborhood Association, which represented their Westside community, and by the summer of 1995 a group of volunteers from that organization had set up the basic structure for the first Buffalo Garden Walk, held on July 15 and 16, 1995. The event was open to anyone in the area who wanted to participate. Twenty-nine gardens were entered, most in the area enclosed by West Ferry Street, Richmond Avenue, Summer Street, and Elmwood Avenue. The front porch of Lunenfeld and McCarthy's home was the headquarters for the event for its first five years.

In the intervening years, Garden Walk has grown beyond its original size and scope. The number of gardens participating in the Garden Walk has increased every year, growing to 355 in 2010, making the event one of the largest of its kind in the United States.
