= Deep plowing =

Farming technique

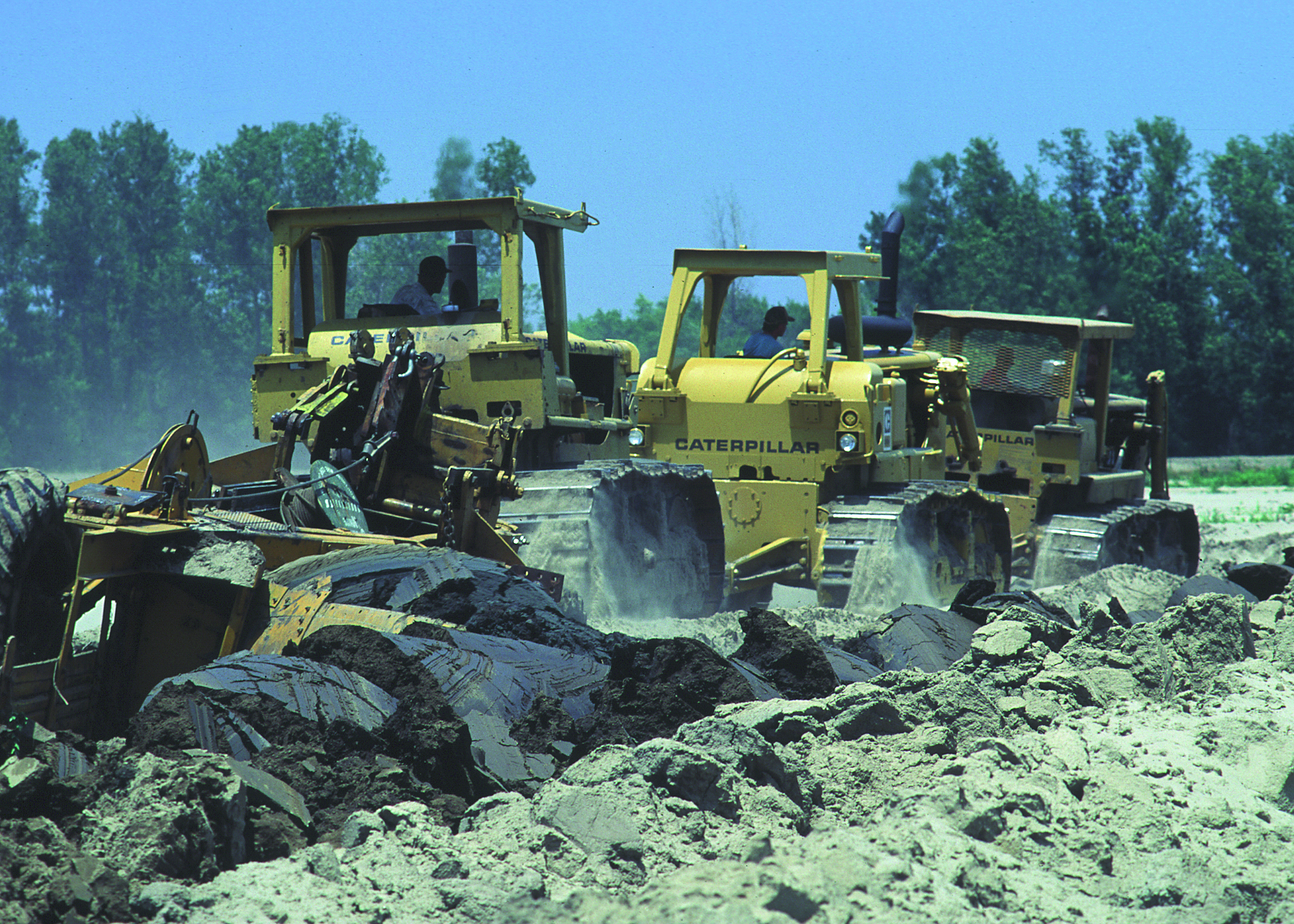
Deep plowing used in an attempt to restore fertility to flood-damaged cropland in Missouri, US.

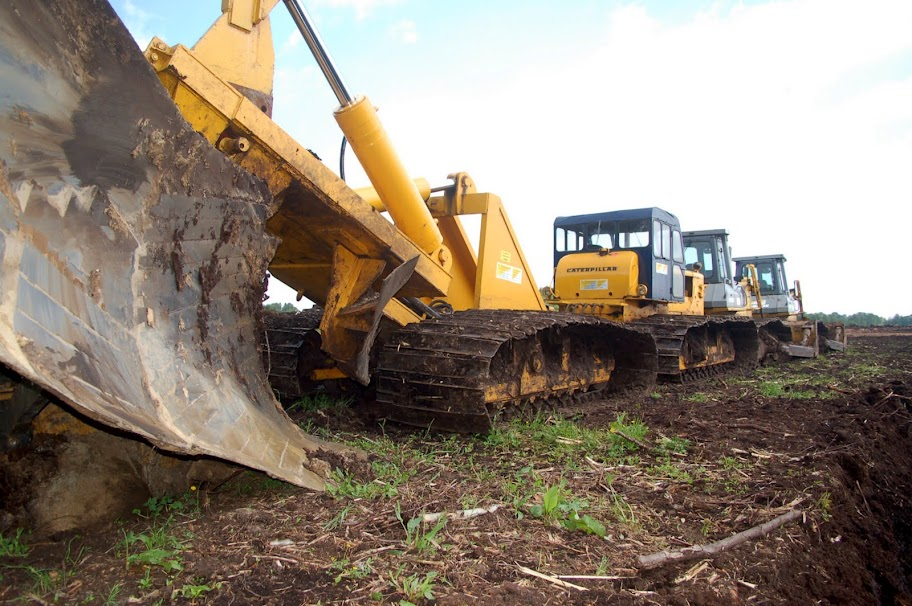
Detail of a plough used for deep plowing, Ekern/Bad Zwischenahn, Germany.

Deep plowing is a plowing to a depth greater than 50 cm (20 in) as compared to ordinary plowing which rarely exceeds 20 cm (8 in). The purpose of deep plowing is to modify the soil water retention characteristics over the long term. In one long-term test, lasting 35 years, the mean annual grain yield was 2,800 lbs per acre (3,138 kg per ha) with deep plowing, which was 10% greater than the 2,550 lbs per acre (2,858 kg per ha) yield in unplowed plots. In soils like Podsol deep plowing can break up hardpan and aid in releasing soil nutrients.

Under certain conditions, it is recommended to use deep plowing in preparing the soil for planting new vineyards.

There is a movement away from plowing altogether and from deep plowing in particular. The theory is that this will stop the loss of topsoil, increase the organic content of soil and reduce runoff of fertilizer and pesticides into rivers. Another part of the no-plowing theory is that ground moisture would be conserved; but this was shown to be incorrect by a 35-year study.

== See also ==
- Great Leap Forward
- Dust Bowl
