= Cobble Hill, Brooklyn =

Neighborhood in New York City

Coordinates: 40°41′17.5″N 73°59′45.4″W

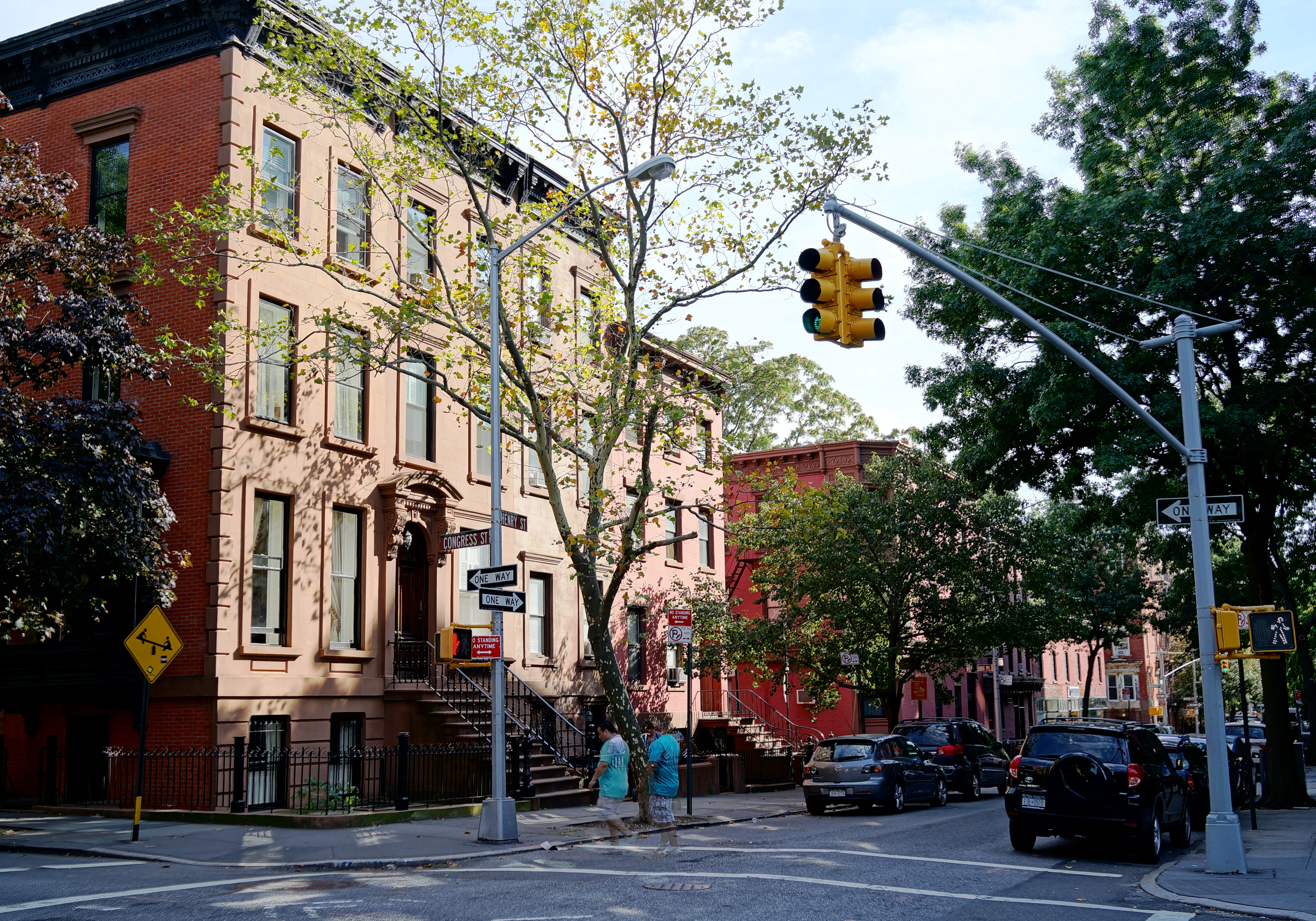
The intersection of Henry and Congress streets (2013)

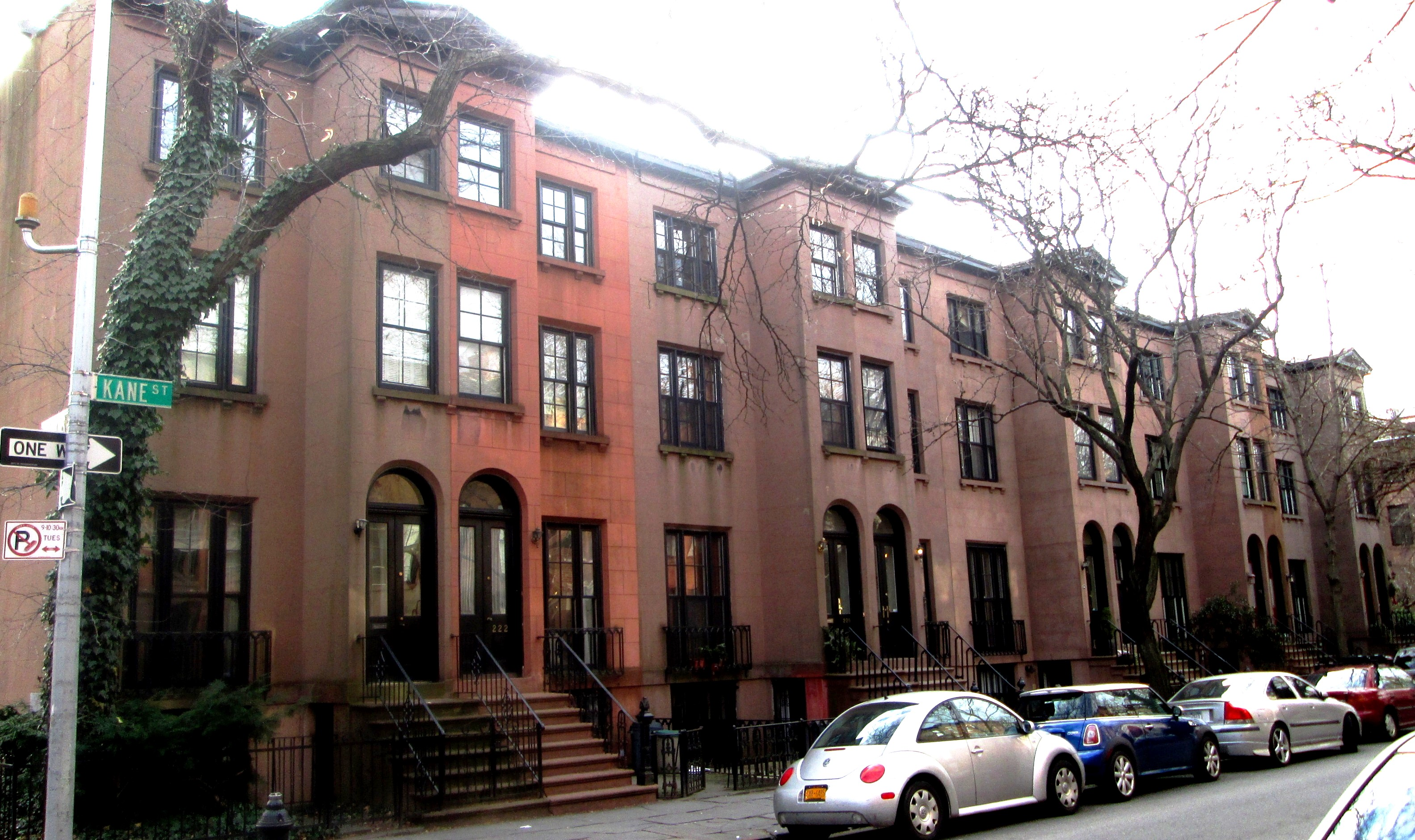
Rowhouses on Kane Street between Clinton Street and Tompkins Place

Cobble Hill is a neighborhood in the northwestern portion of the New York City borough of Brooklyn. A small neighborhood comprising 40 blocks, Cobble Hill sits adjacent to Brooklyn Heights to the north, Boerum Hill to the east, Carroll Gardens to the south, and the Columbia Street Waterfront District to the west. It is bounded by Atlantic Avenue (north), Court Street (east), Degraw Street (south) and the Brooklyn–Queens Expressway (west). Other sources add to the neighborhood a rectangle bounded by Wyckoff Street on the north, Hoyt Street on the east, Degraw Street on the south, and Court Street on the west.

Through its early history, the area now called "Cobble Hill" was considered to be part of South Brooklyn, Red Hook, or simply the Sixth Ward, or as part of Brooklyn Heights. The current name, a revival of a name which had died out by the 1880s, was adopted in 1959. Much of the neighborhood, which has "one of the city's finest collections of nineteenth-century houses", is included in the Cobble Hill Historic District.

Cobble Hill is part of Brooklyn Community District 6 and its ZIP Codes are 11201 and 11231. It is served by the 76th Precinct of the New York City Police Department at 191 Union Street. Fire services are provided by the New York City Fire Department's Engine Company 206 and Ladder Company 108, located in nearby Carroll Gardens.

== History ==
Location in New York City

=== Early history and development ===
Cobble Hill – which was named after the conical shaped hill called "Cobleshill" or "Ponkiesbergh", located where the current intersection of Atlantic Avenue, Pacific Street, and Court Street now lies – was originally settled during the 1640s by Dutch farmers when Willem Kieft, the director of New Netherland, granted patents in the area. The hill was used as a fort – known as "Cobble Hill Fort", "Smith's Barbette", or "Corkscrew Fort" – during the American War of Independence; the British cut off the top of the hill during their occupation, so it could not be used to look down on their headquarters in Brooklyn Heights. They also seized the estate of Philip Livingston for use as a naval hospital. Cobble Hill was again fortified for the War of 1812, and was then called "Fort Swift".

In 1834, the Village of Brooklyn – chartered in 1816 and primarily made up of present-day Brooklyn Heights – became a city and soon expanded south beyond Atlantic Street (now Atlantic Avenue) to include South Brooklyn.

Until the establishment of the South Ferry, which connected Atlantic Avenue to Manhattan's Whitehall Street in 1836, South Brooklyn was primarily rural. After that time, with the guidelines for a gridiron street pattern already established in 1834, the area developed rapidly. New streets were being laid progressively, and with the development of new buildings – which started nearer to the waterfront and moved inward – the rural community slowly started changing into a middle-class suburban residential community dominated by small rows of houses, which began to be built as early as 1835. The transformation of the neighborhood was nearly completed by 1860; none of the farm houses from the neighborhood's rural period are extant.

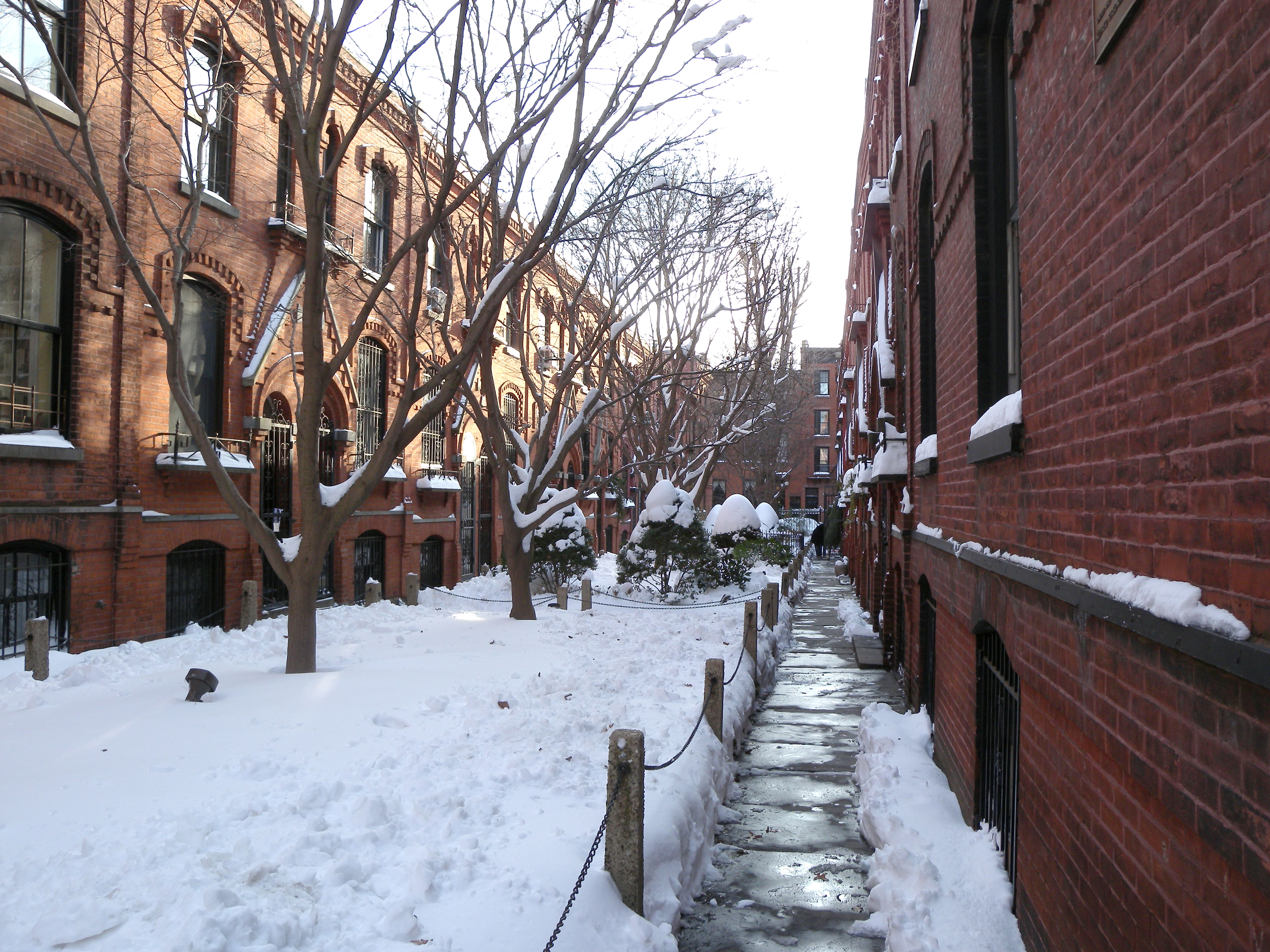
"Workingman's Cottages" built by philanthropist Alfred Tredway White as low-cost housing in 1876 (shown here in 2009)

According to the 1840 tax list and street directory, the neighborhood of present-day Cobble Hill contained 45 houses and 112 residents. Although this housing boom caused prices to rise, in 1850 it was still possible for a clerk to pay rent of $200 a year (equivalent to $6,146 in 2019) for a row house with a large backyard, albeit on a narrow lot. This provoked an influx of new residents from Manhattan.

Philanthropist Alfred Tredway White built two experimental housing projects in the neighborhood. These were the Romanesque revival "Towers" and "Home" buildings (now collectively known as Cobble Hill Towers), at 417–435 and 439-45 Hicks Street, meant as affordable housing for the working class, with adequate light and air for all; and the "Workingman's Cottages" of Warren Place, a one block mews from Warren Street to Baltic Street between Henry and Hicks Streets, which was two rows of narrow single family houses (11 feet (3.4 m) wide) built around a private courtyard. These were intended for slightly more upscale workers. All were built on adjoining lots in 1876 and were designed by William Field & Son; they were restored in 1986 by Maitland, Strauss & Behr. With these projects, which served Native Americans, Irish, Swedes, Norwegians, English, and German workmen, White became the first builder of low rent/low profit housing in the United States. His philosophy was "Philanthropy plus 5%".

Beginning in the 1840s and progressing into the 1870s, wealthier Manhattanites, including bankers and merchants, began to move to various parts of Brooklyn, including Cobble Hill. By 1880, the population of the area was solidly upper-middle class and the cost of houses had almost equaled those in Brooklyn Heights, of which Cobble Hill was an outgrowth.

The Cobble Hill Historic District Designation Report lists the architecture of the neighborhood as including many rowhouses in the Greek Revival and Italianate styles and their offshoots, but also examples of the Romanesque Revival, Gothic Revival, Queen Anne, French Second Empire, and neo-Grec styles.

=== 20th century ===
The 20th century saw an influx of immigrants into the neighborhood from Ireland, Italy, and the Middle East; some low-rise apartment buildings were constructed prior to the 1920s. After a period of relative quiet, by 1950, brownstones were being rejuvenated and the neighborhood began to experience a renaissance, leading to the revival of the "Cobble Hill" name, perhaps engendered by a real estate agent who saw the name "Cobles Hill" on a 1766 map and updated it. Organized community groups fought against large housing projects, and prevailed on the city to make the area an historic district.

The historic district – first designated by the New York City Landmarks Preservation Commission (NYLPC) on December 20, 1969 and extended on June 7, 1988, – is roughly bordered by Atlantic Avenue to the north, Court Street to the east, Degraw Street to the south, and Hicks Street to the west, with a "bite" removed from the northeast corner of that rectangle. Its area measures approximately twenty-two city blocks. According to the NYLPC, the Cobble Hill Historic District is an "unusually fine 19th century residential area" and "retains an aura of the past with its charming streets and architecture". The Cobble Hill Historic District was listed on the National Register of Historic Places in 1976.

Today on the two main commercial streets – Court and Smith Streets – generations-old family-run stores and businesses such as Italian meat markets and barber shops sit side by side with trendy new shops, restaurants, and cafes. Atlantic Avenue, the northern border of the neighborhood, features one of New York City's largest collections of Middle-Eastern shops, some of which have been there for decades. The northern part of Smith Street is known as Brooklyn's "Restaurant Row" due to the large number of eateries and watering holes that opened on the street during the late 1990s and early 2000s. With a second blossoming of specialized bars along the corridor in the late 2000s, Smith Street became an upscale weekend nightlife destination.

== Cobble Hill Park ==
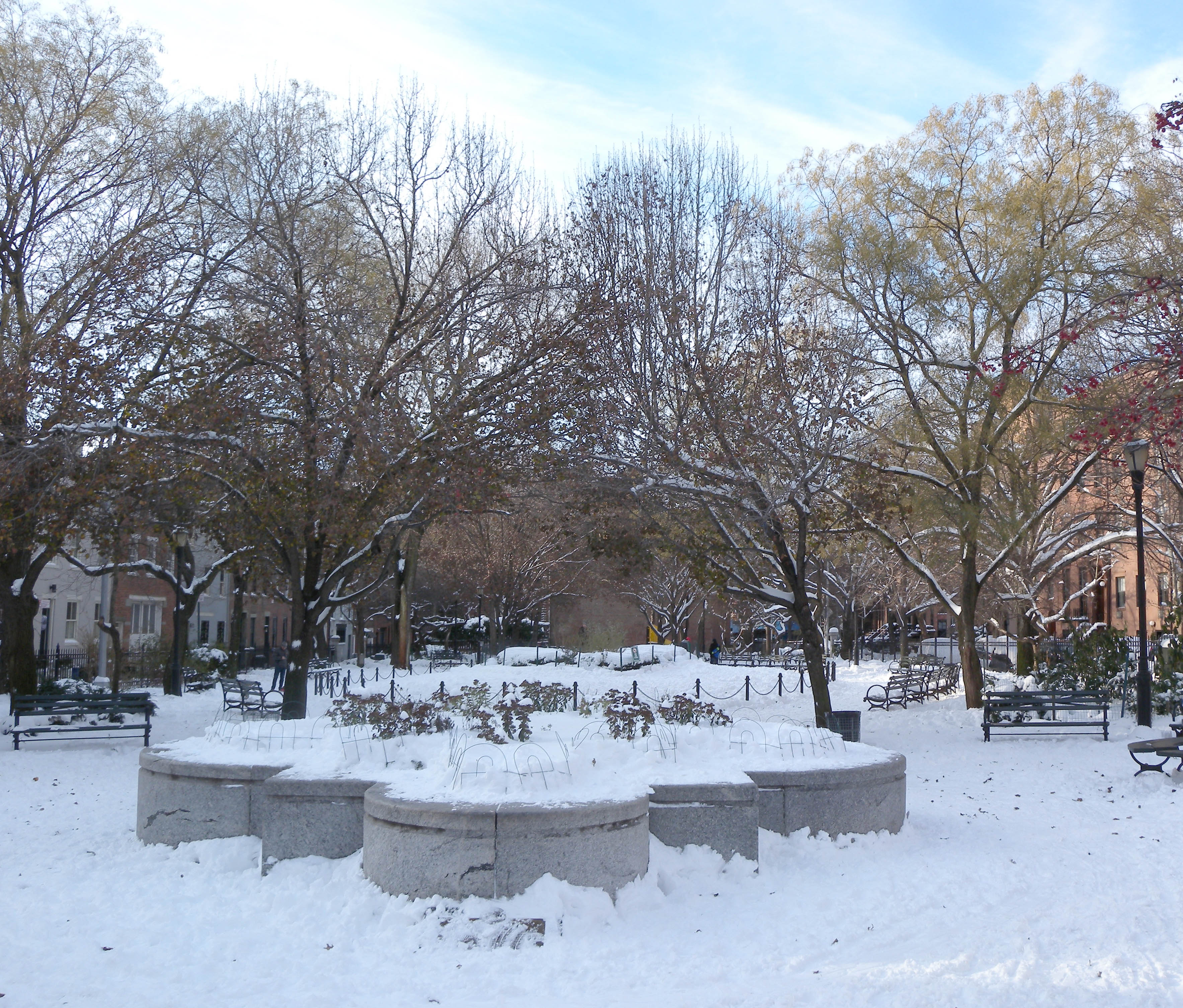
Cobble Hill Park with snow on the ground

Cobble Hill Park, on Clinton Street between Verandah Place and Congress Street, was created in 1965. The site had been the location of two mansions (the Weber and Whitten Mansions) and the Second Unitarian Church, which was abandoned by the 1940s, when the site was purchased by the Bohack Corporation, a supermarket chain. The mansions were demolished, and in the 1960s the corporation planned to build a supermarket on the site, a proposition which was opposed by the Cobble Hill community, which felt the need for a park for the neighborhood. Bohack sold the site to developers in 1962, who planned to build a low-rise apartment building. The community collected signatures and successfully petitioned the city to create a park.

The city bought the property in 1963 and the park was dedicated in 1965. It was reconstructed in 1989, winning the 1988 Annual Award for Excellence in Design from the Art Commission and the Parks Council's Philip Winslow Award for Public Projects in 1990, the first time it was awarded. The new design reflected the 19th-century brick-and-stone character of the tree-lined neighborhood.

== Education ==
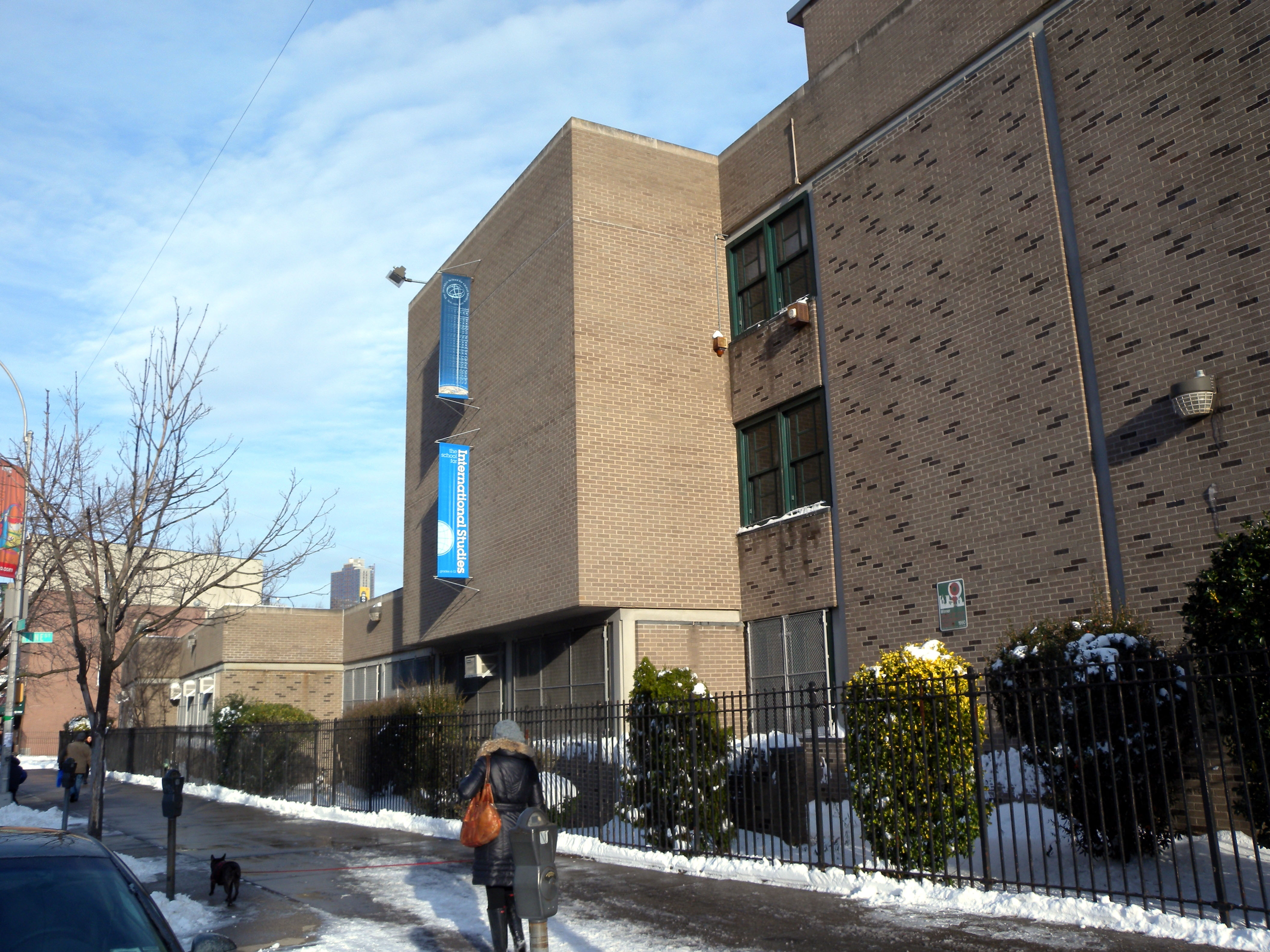
The School for International Studies

=== Schools ===
- Public School 29, also known as the John M. Harrigan School, is a school located on Henry Street.
- The building on Baltic Street that formerly housed Intermediate School 293 – which closed in 2005 due to poor performance – now contains two 6–12th grade schools:
  - Digital Arts and Cinema Technology High School occupies the top floor
  - The School for International Studies is on the bottom floor.
- Success Academy Cobble Hill, a charter primary school, opened in August 2012.

=== Libraries ===
Though there are no public libraries in Cobble Hill itself, Brooklyn Public Library (BPL) operates three branches nearby:

- The Brooklyn Heights branch, located at 286 Cadman Plaza West, in Brooklyn Heights
- The Carroll Gardens branch, located at 396 Clinton Street near Union Street, in Carroll Gardens
- The Pacific branch, located at 25 Fourth Avenue near Pacific Street, in Boerum Hill

== Religion ==
The neighborhood has a multitude of churches, many of them dating from prior to the Civil War. Some have been converted for residential use.

- Christ Church and Holy Family at Clinton and Kane Streets, built in 1840–41, was an early design in the Gothic Revival style by Richard Upjohn Some of the interior furnishings are by Louis Comfort Tiffany, and date from 1937. Christ Church was the first organized religious group in the Cobble Hill area, having been founded in 1835. The congregation later merged with that of the Church of the Holy Family.
- Old St. Paul's Church at Court and Congress Streets was designed by Gamaliel King and built c.1838, allowing the claim that this church is the oldest Roman Catholic church in continuous use in Brooklyn. The steeple was added in the 1860s, and other enlargements were made. The church front faces Court Street, the chapel and former rectory face Congress Street. The parish was originally largely Irish.
- Congregation Baith Israel Anshei Emes, which splintered off an earlier congregation, is located at 236 Kane Street in Cobble Hill, in the former Middle Dutch Reformed Church, built in the Romanesque style c.1856. It is currently the oldest continuously operating synagogue in Brooklyn.
- St. Peter's Roman Catholic Church on Hicks Street, built in 1860 and designed by Patrick Charles Keely, was part of a complex which included the church, a school, and a hospital. The church and the school have been converted to host condominium apartments. The original parish was largely Italian.
- South Brooklyn Seventh-Day Adventist Church at 249 Degraw Street was built in 1905 as the Trinity German Lutheran Church, and was designed by Theobald Engelhart.
- St. Francis Cabrini Roman Catholic Chapel at Degraw Street and Strong Place was built in 1851–52 as the Strong Place Baptist Church. It was designed by Minard Lafever in the Gothic Revival style. The building was converted into apartments in 2010.
- The Second Unitarian Church, known as the "Church of the Turtle" because it physically resembled one, was designed by Jacob Wrey Mould and built in 1858 on the site where Cobble Hill Park is today.
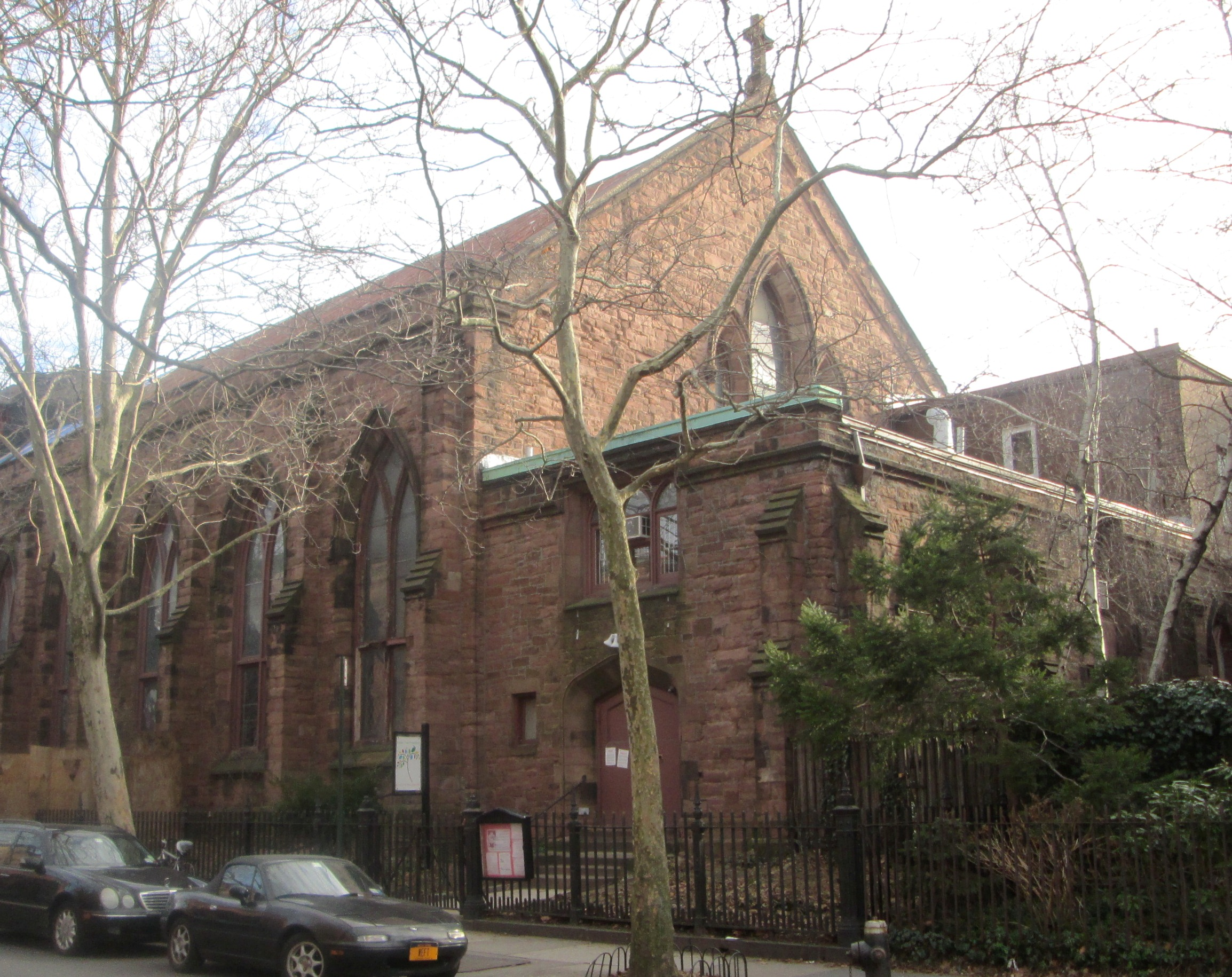
Christ Church and Holy Family Episcopal Church by Richard Upjohn (1841–42)

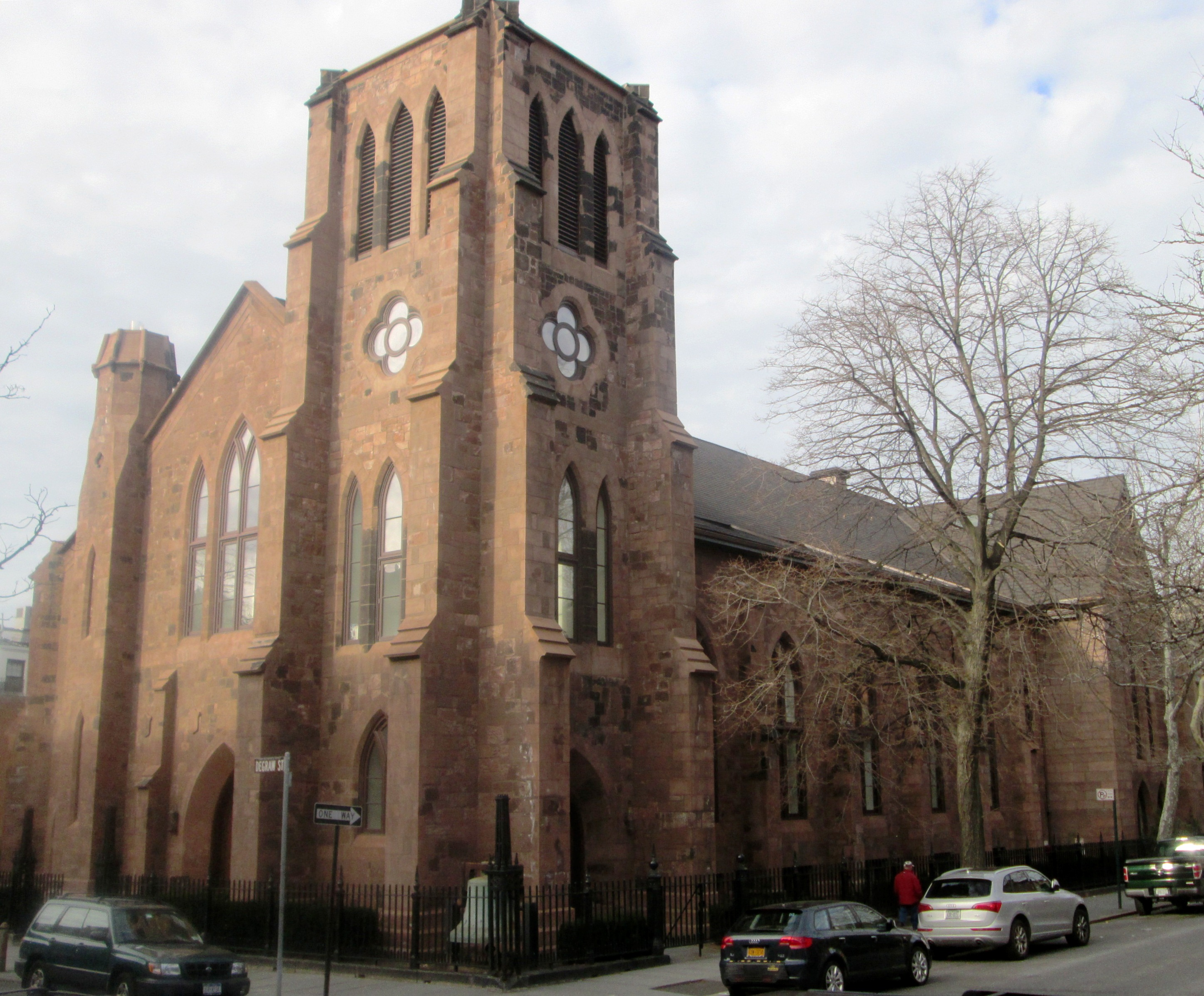
Strong Place Baptist Church by Minard Lafever, later St. Francis Cabrini Roman Catholic Chapel, now apartments (1851–52)

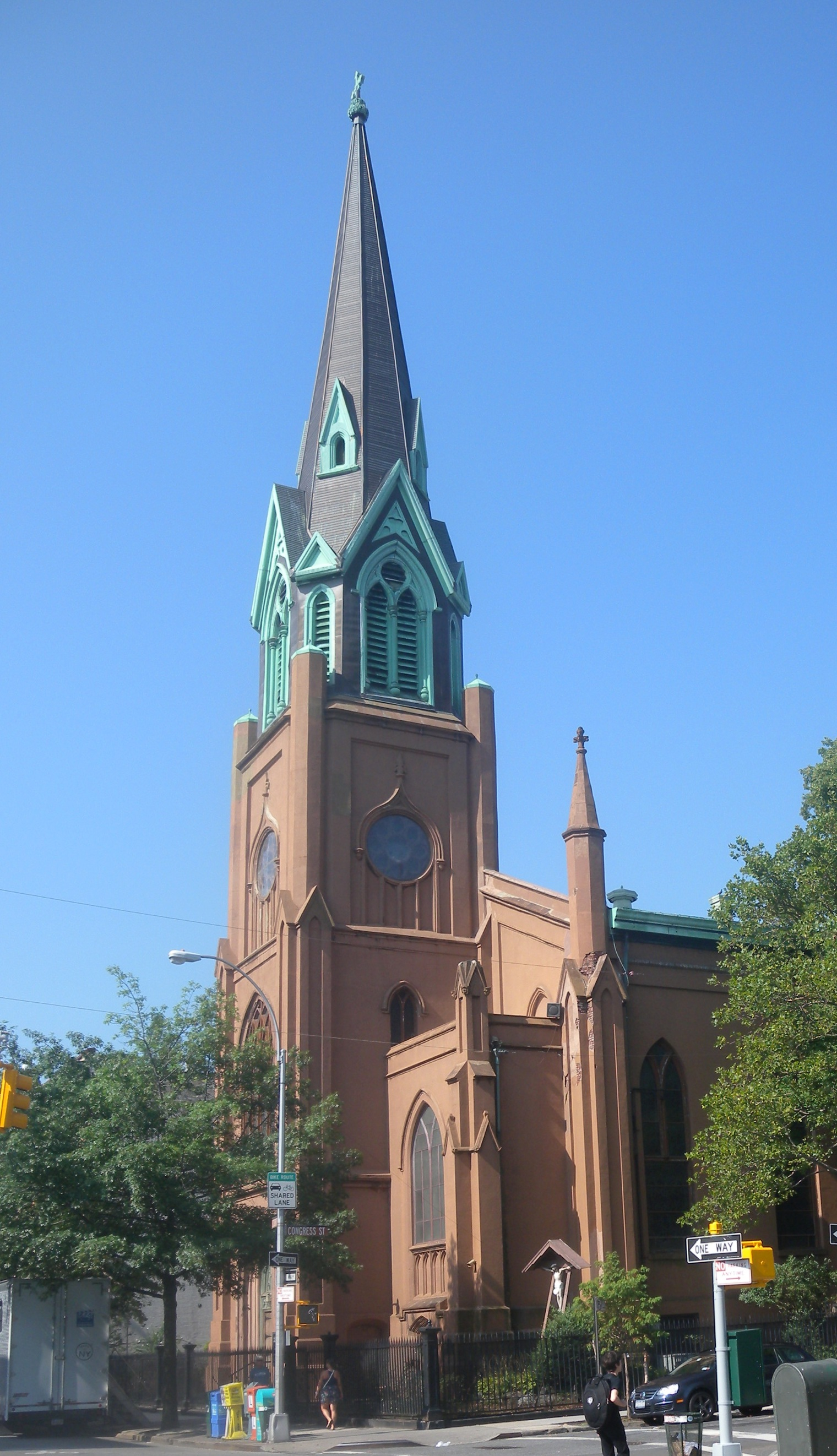
Old St. Paul's Roman Catholic Church by Gamaliel King (1838, with later additions)

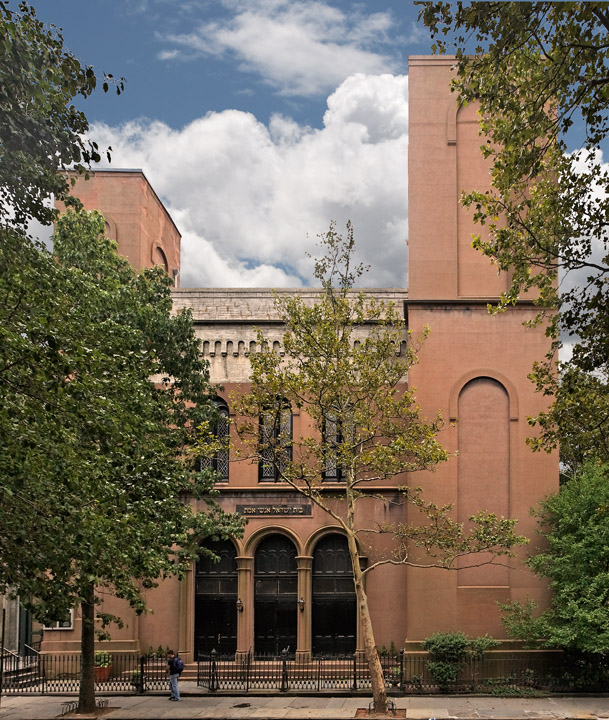
Congregation Baith Israel Anshei Emes, the oldest Jewish congregation in Brooklyn, is located in the Kane Street Synagogue, originally built as the Middle Dutch Reformed Church (1855–56)

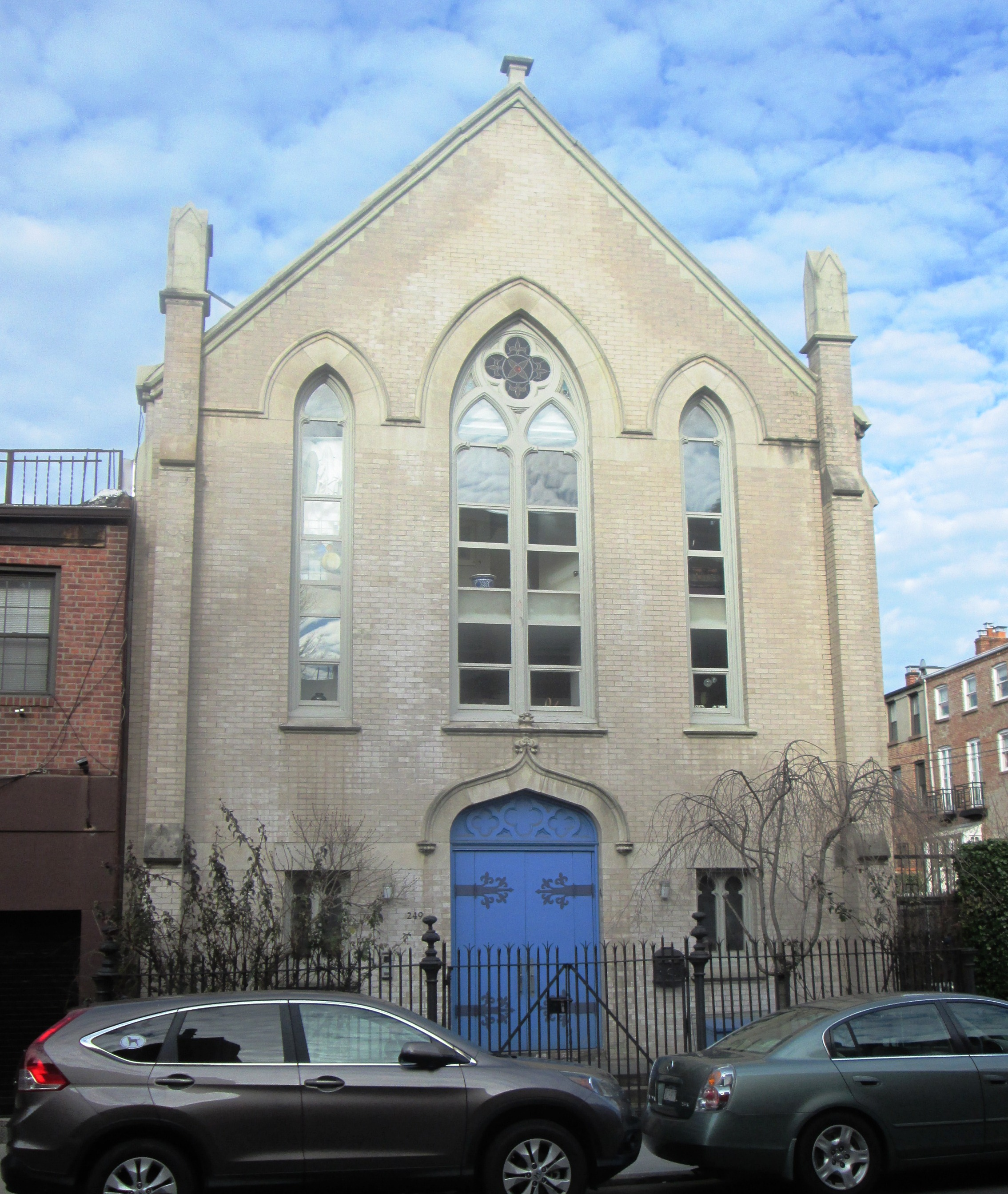
The South Brooklyn Seventh-Day Adventist Church by Theobald Engelhardt, built as the Trinity German Lutheran Church (1905)

== Hospitals ==
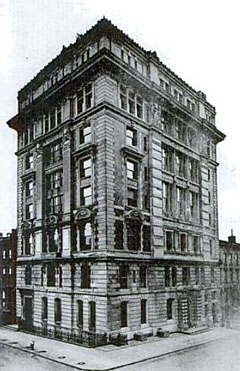
The Polhemus Building of Long Island College Hospital (1897)

In the northeast corner of the neighborhood, located partially in the Historic District, was University Hospital of Brooklyn at Long Island College Hospital, which was founded by German immigrants in 1857. It began a school of medicine, the Long Island College of Medicine, in 1850; the school became a separate institution in 1930, and since 1954 was the primary teaching affiliate of SUNY Downstate Medical Center. The first private bacteriological laboratory in the United States, Hoagland Laboratory, was built in 1888 at 335 Henry Street, but was destroyed by fire and is no longer extant. The Polhemus Building, now Polhemus Memorial Clinic, was built in 1897 and was designed by Marshall Emery in the French Mannerist style. Dudley Memorial, designed by William Hough was built in 1902. Other buildings were designed by D. Everett Waid and William Higginson. Further expansion took place in the modern era, with buildings raised in 1963, 1974, 1984, and 1988. The hospital was the sixth largest in Brooklyn. After the closure of Long Island College Hospital in August 2014, a freestanding emergency department—NYU Cobble Hill, part of NYU Langone Medical Center—opened in October 2014. The hospital plans to replace the existing facility with a new ambulatory care center and freestanding emergency department at the site, estimated to cost $200 million.

== Other points of interest ==
- The DeGraw Mansion, also known as the Ralph L. Cutter House, at Clinton and Amity Streets, was built in 1845 and altered in 1891 with a tower in order to see the harbor, the view of which had become blocked by the development of the neighborhood.
- The former Dr. Joseph E. Clark House, at 340 Clinton Street between Degraw and Kane Streets, was built c.1860, and is "the widest single house in Cobble Hill".
- 272 Warren Street, a neo-Grec house built c.1899, stands out from its neighbors
- 174 Pacific Street between Clinton and Court Streets, was built in 1889 as Public School 78
- The commercial building that now houses Trader Joe's, formerly the South Brooklyn Savings Institution and then the Independence Savings Bank, was built in 1922 and was designed by McKenzie, Voorhees & Gmelin in the Florentine Renaissance style. Located at 130 Court Street at Atlantic Avenue, it was added to in 1936 by Charles A. Holmes. The cornice features one hundred eagles. The site is the location where General George Washington watched his troops retreat from the Battle of Long Island.

== Transportation ==
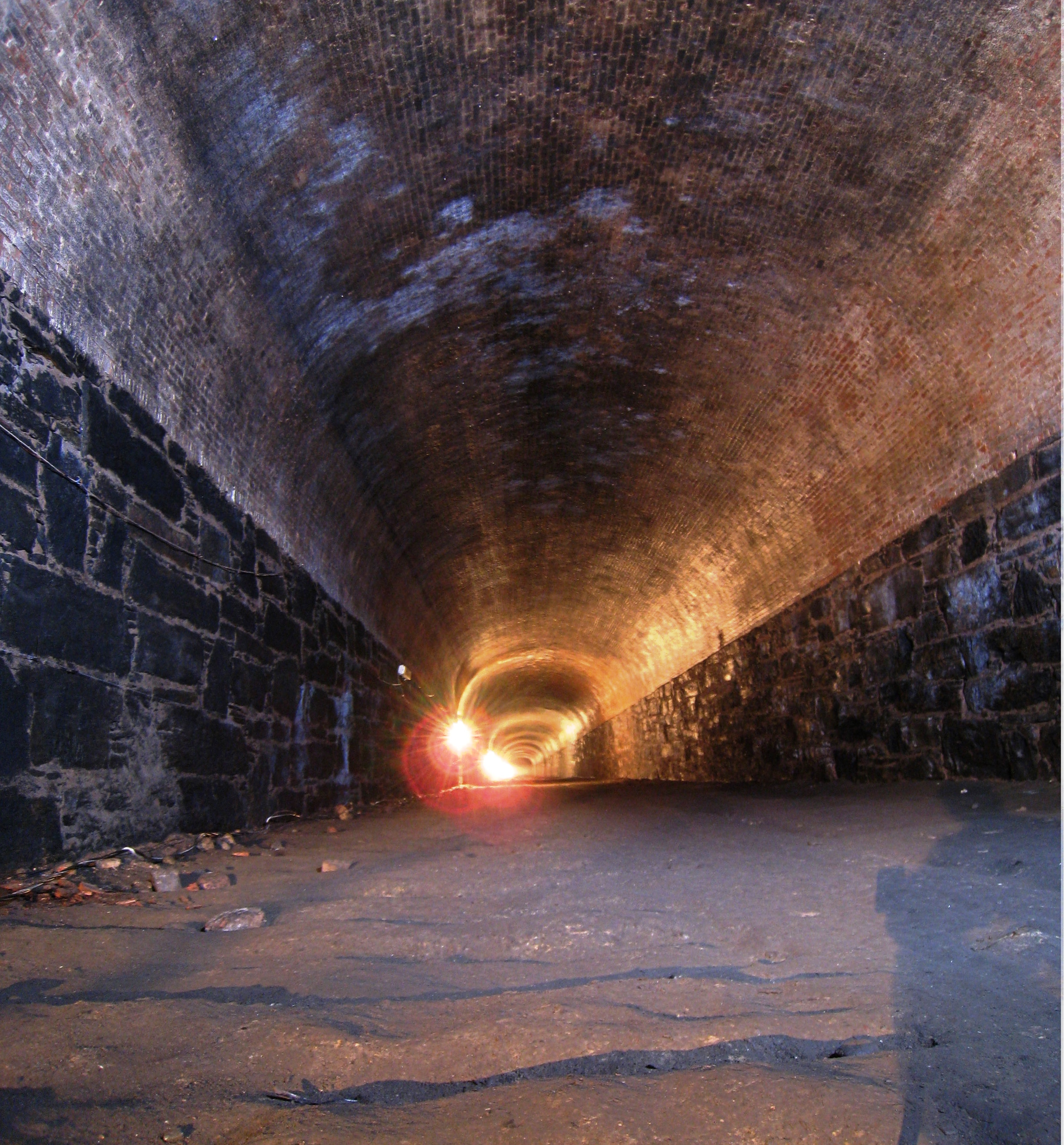
The Atlantic Avenue Tunnel, photographed in 2009

The Cobble Hill Tunnel, under Atlantic Avenue, was built in 1844 to replace the railroad tracks that ran down the middle of Atlantic Avenue as part of the Atlantic Avenue Railroad. Trains used these tracks to transport goods to and from the waterfront during the 1840s, and the tunnel was built to avoid the trains' need to climb a steep hill. The tunnel is now abandoned, but originally ran from Times Plaza to the Ferry Terminal. The brick-lined vaulted tunnel is 17 feet (5.2 m) high by 21 feet (6.4 m) wide and 1,611 feet (491 m) long. Walt Whitman, the poet and editor of the Brooklyn Daily Eagle, said the tunnel was "a passage of solemnity and darkness".

New York City Subway service is available at the Bergen Street station on the IND Culver Line (F, <F>, and G trains). The B61 and B63 (Atlantic Avenue) and B57 (Court Street) bus routes also serve the area.

In June 2017, NYC Ferry's South Brooklyn route started stopping at Brooklyn Bridge Park Pier 6 on the border of Cobble Hill and Brooklyn Heights.

There were plans to build the Brooklyn–Queens Connector (BQX), a light rail system that would run along the waterfront from Red Hook through Cobble Hill to Astoria in Queens. However, the system is projected to cost $2.7 billion, and the projected opening has been delayed indefinitely.

== Notable residents ==
- Martin Amis (1949–2023), writer
- Lady Randolph Churchill (1854–1921), mother of Winston Churchill, was born in a rented house on Amity Street; note that the plaque at 426 Henry Street is incorrect, the Jeromes lived there before she was born.
- Daniel Craig and Rachel Weisz
- Mike D (born 1965), musician
- Michelle Goldberg, author and New York Times op-ed columnist
- Garth Risk Hallberg (born 1978), fiction writer
- Norah Jones (born 1979), singer
- Spike Lee (resident from 1961 to 1969), filmmaker
- Alex McCord, performer on the reality TV program Real Housewives of New York City
- Todd Rosenberg, cartoonist known for the website Odd Todd
- Jenny Slate (born 1982), actress and comedian
- Richard Upjohn (1802–1878) and Richard Upjohn Jr., architects, lived at 296 Clinton Street, which they designed; it was built in 1843 and added to in 1893 by Richard M. Upjohn.
- Thomas Wolfe (1900–1938), writer, lived on Verandah Place between Henry and Clinton Street in the 1930s.

== In popular culture ==
- Cobble Hill Park is the setting of the inciting incident in the English translation of Yasmina Reza's Tony Award–winning play God of Carnage (2009).
- In the TV show White Collar (2009–2014), main characters Peter and Elizabeth Burke live in Cobble Hill.
