= Cobble Hill Historic District =

Historic district in Brooklyn, New York

- U.S. National Register of Historic Places
- U.S. Historic district
- New York City Landmark
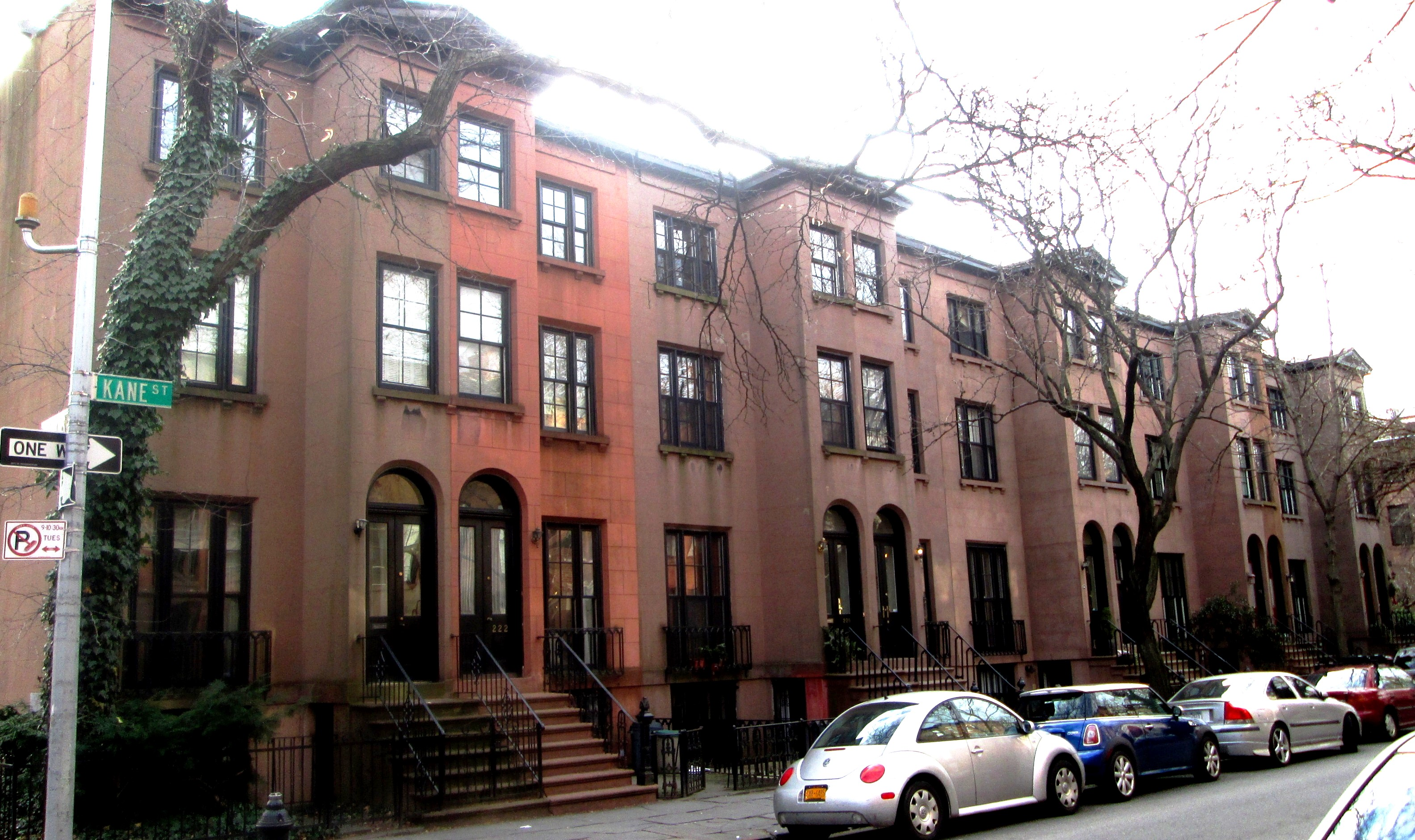
- Rowhouses on Kane Street between Clinton Street and Tompkins Place

- Location within New York City Location within New York Location within the United States
- Location: Roughly bounded by Atlantic Avenue, Court, Degraw and Hicks Streets; Brooklyn, New York City
- Coordinates: 40°41′21″N 73°59′47″W
- Area: 60 acres (24 ha)
- Built: 1830s - 1920s
- Architect: various
- Architectural style: Greek Revival, Italianate, Queen Anne, etc.
- NRHP reference No.: 76001225

Significant dates
- Added to NRHP: June 11, 1976
- Designated NYCL: December 20, 1969 extension: June 7, 1988

The Cobble Hill Historic District is a municipal and national historic district located in the Cobble Hill neighborhood of Brooklyn, New York City. The national district consists of 796 contributing, largely residential buildings built between the 1830s and 1920s. It includes fine examples of Greek Revival, Italianate, and Queen Anne style row houses. Also in the district are a number of notable churches, including ones by Richard Upjohn (Christ Church, 1841–42) and Minard Lafever (St. Francis Cabrini Chapel, originally Strong Place Baptist Church), 1851–52). A number of early 20th century apartment buildings are part of the district as well.

The Cobble Hill Historic District was first designated a New York City landmark by the New York City Landmarks Preservation Commission in 1969. It was then listed on the National Register of Historic Places in 1976. The city extended the district in 1988.

== Gallery ==
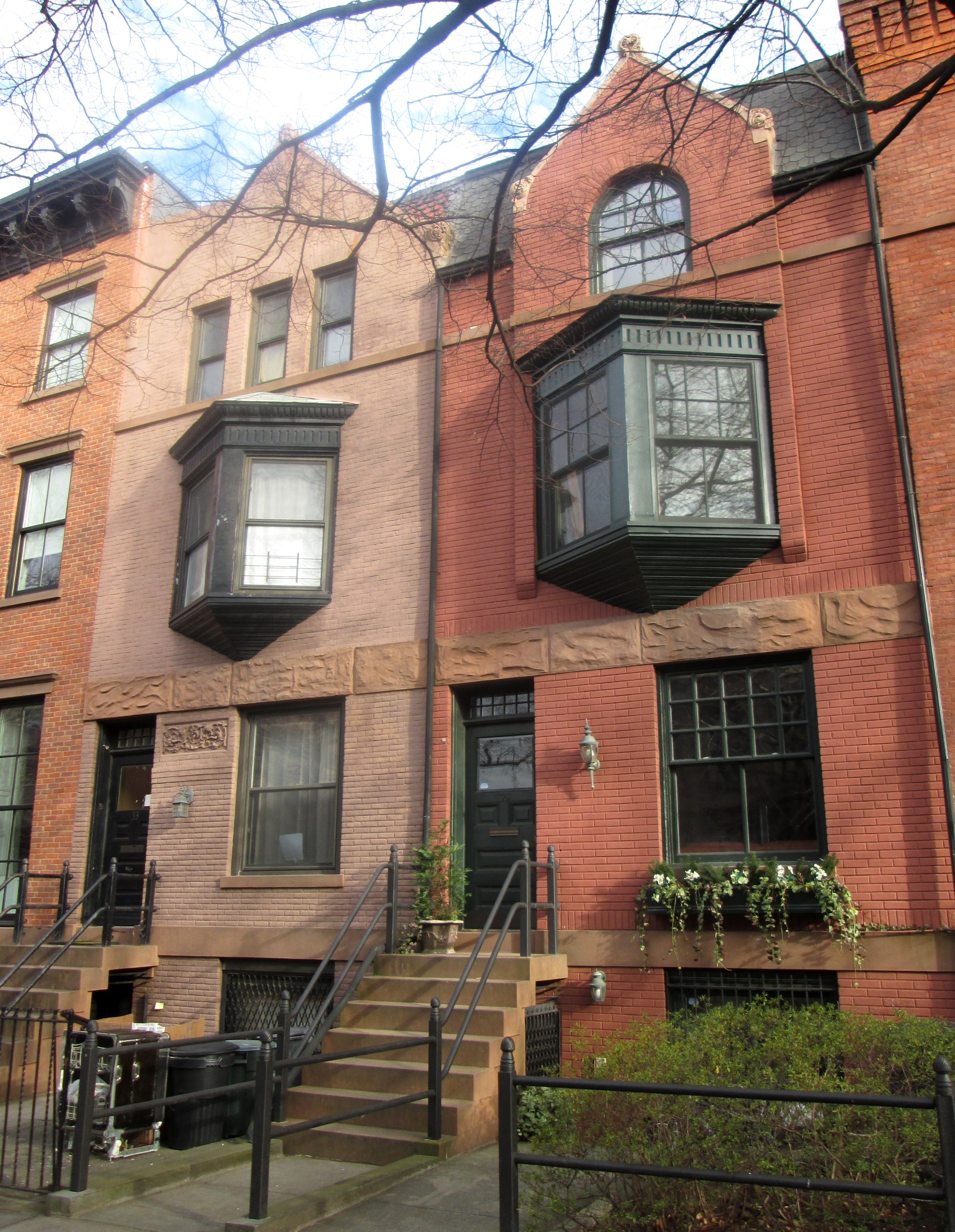
33 & 35 Strong Place between Degraw and Kane Streets, part of a set of seven Queen Anne rowhouses (1891)

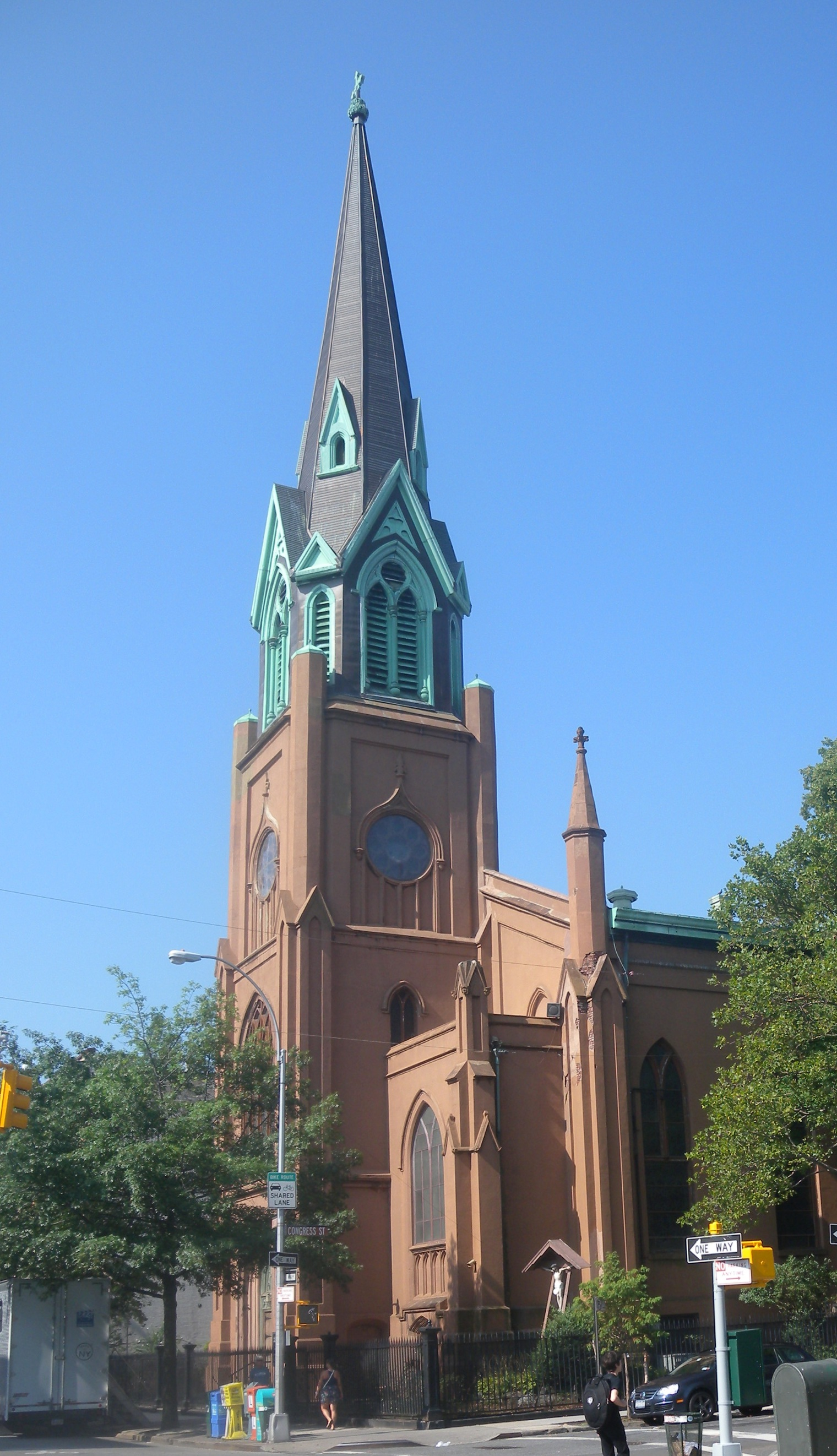
Old St. Paul's Roman Catholic Church by Gamaliel King (1838, with later additions)

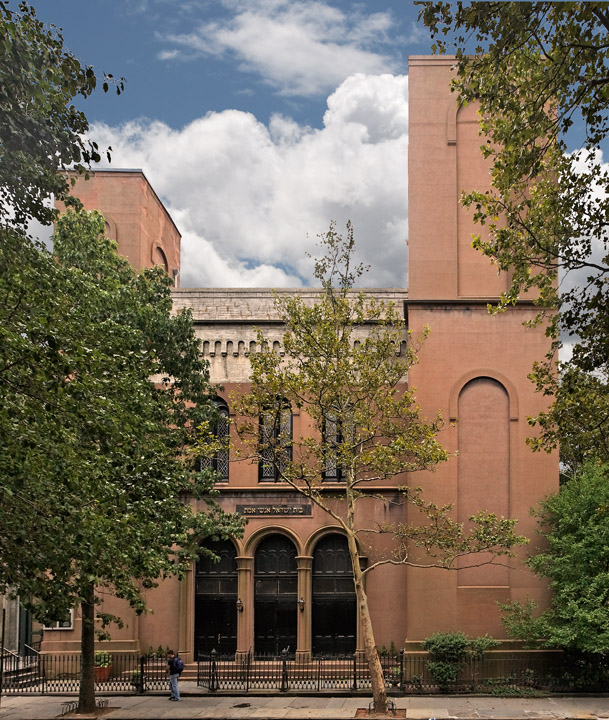
Congregation Baith Israel Anshei Emes, the oldest Jewish congregation in Brooklyn, built as Middle Dutch Reformed Church (1855–56)

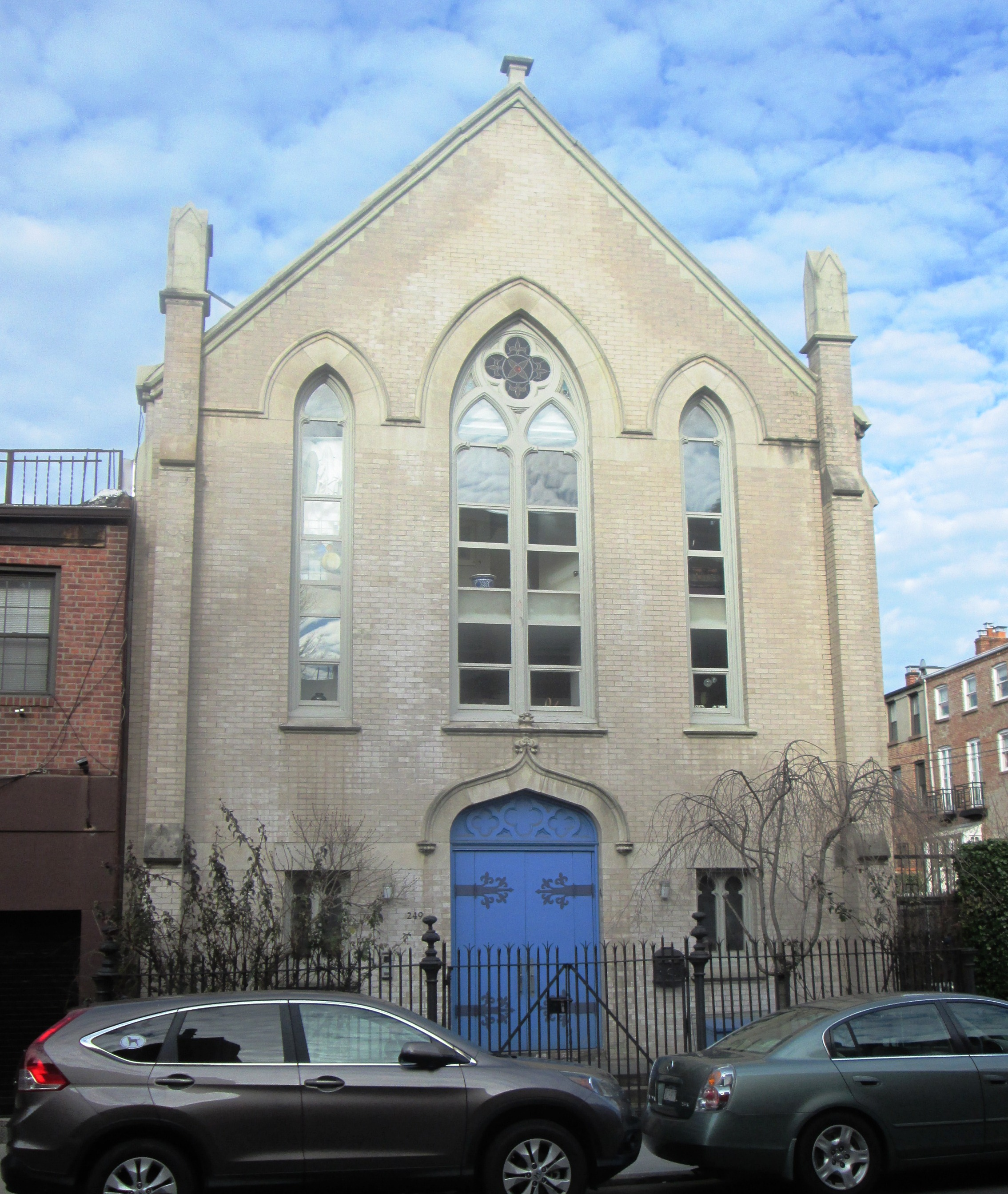
The South Brooklyn Seventh-Day Adventist Church by Theobald Engelhardt, built as the Trinity German Lutheran Church (1905)

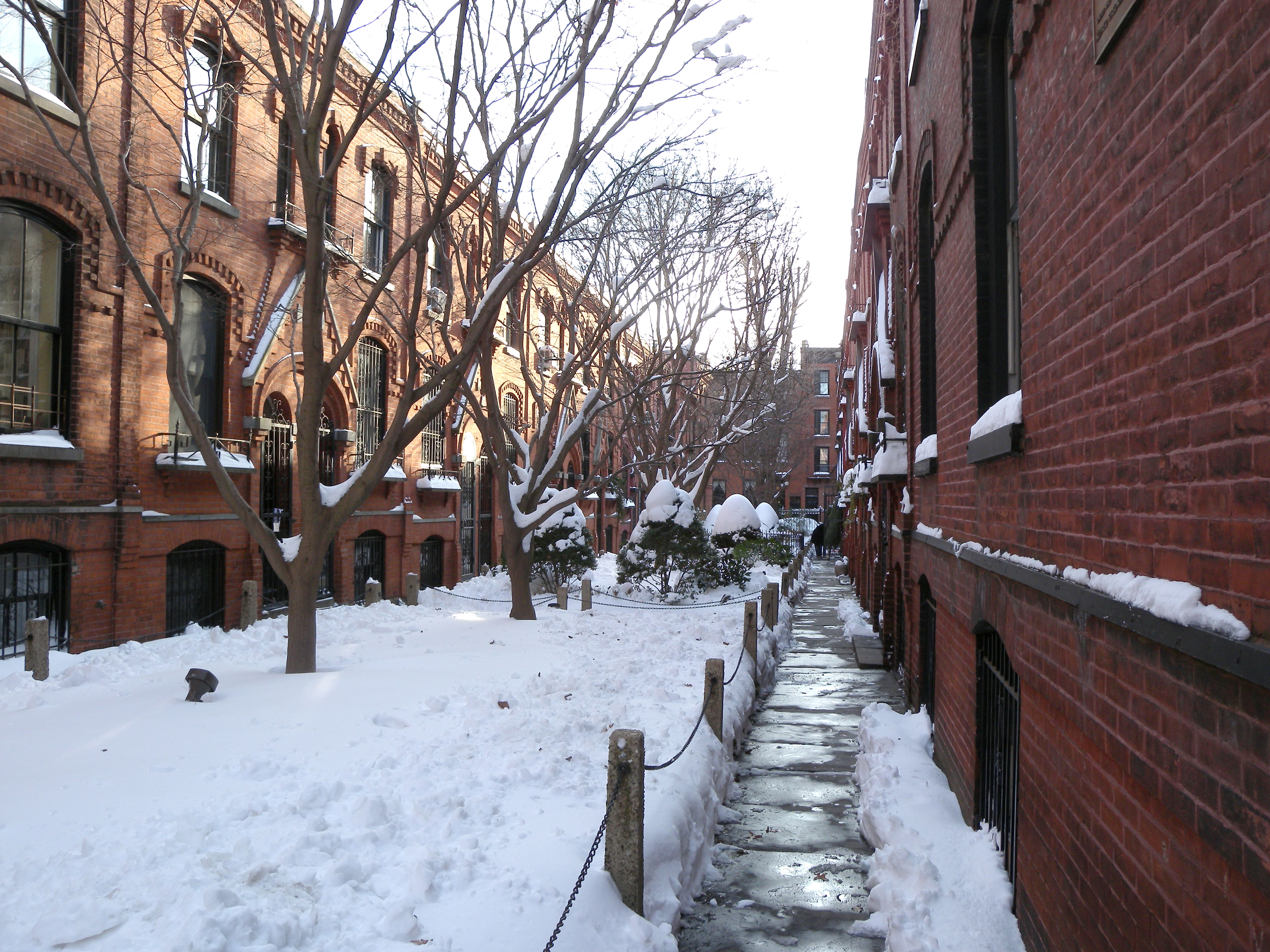
"Workingman's Cottages" built by philanthropist Alfred Tredway White as low-cost housing (1876)

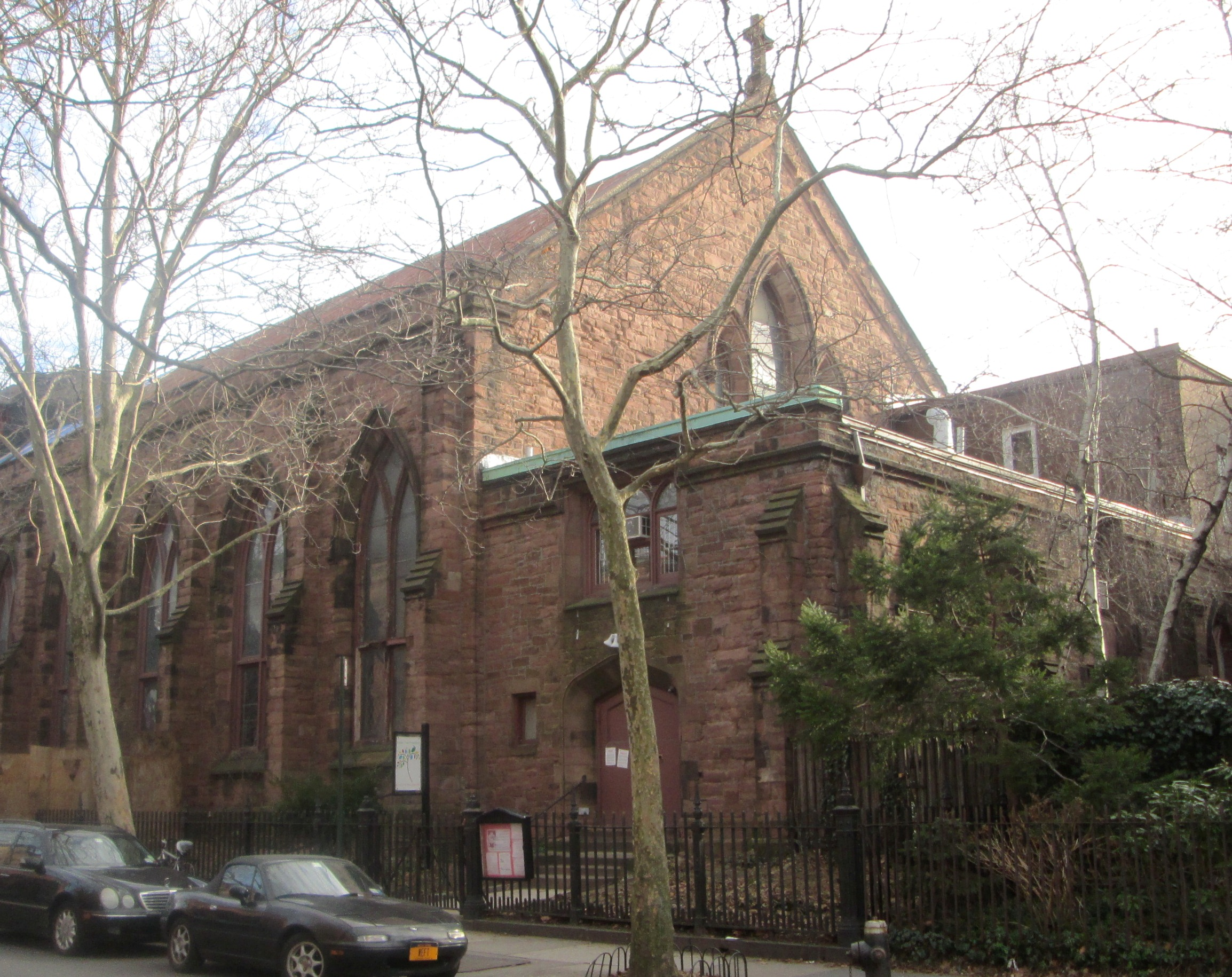
Christ Church and Holy Family Episcopal Church by Richard Upjohn (1841–42)

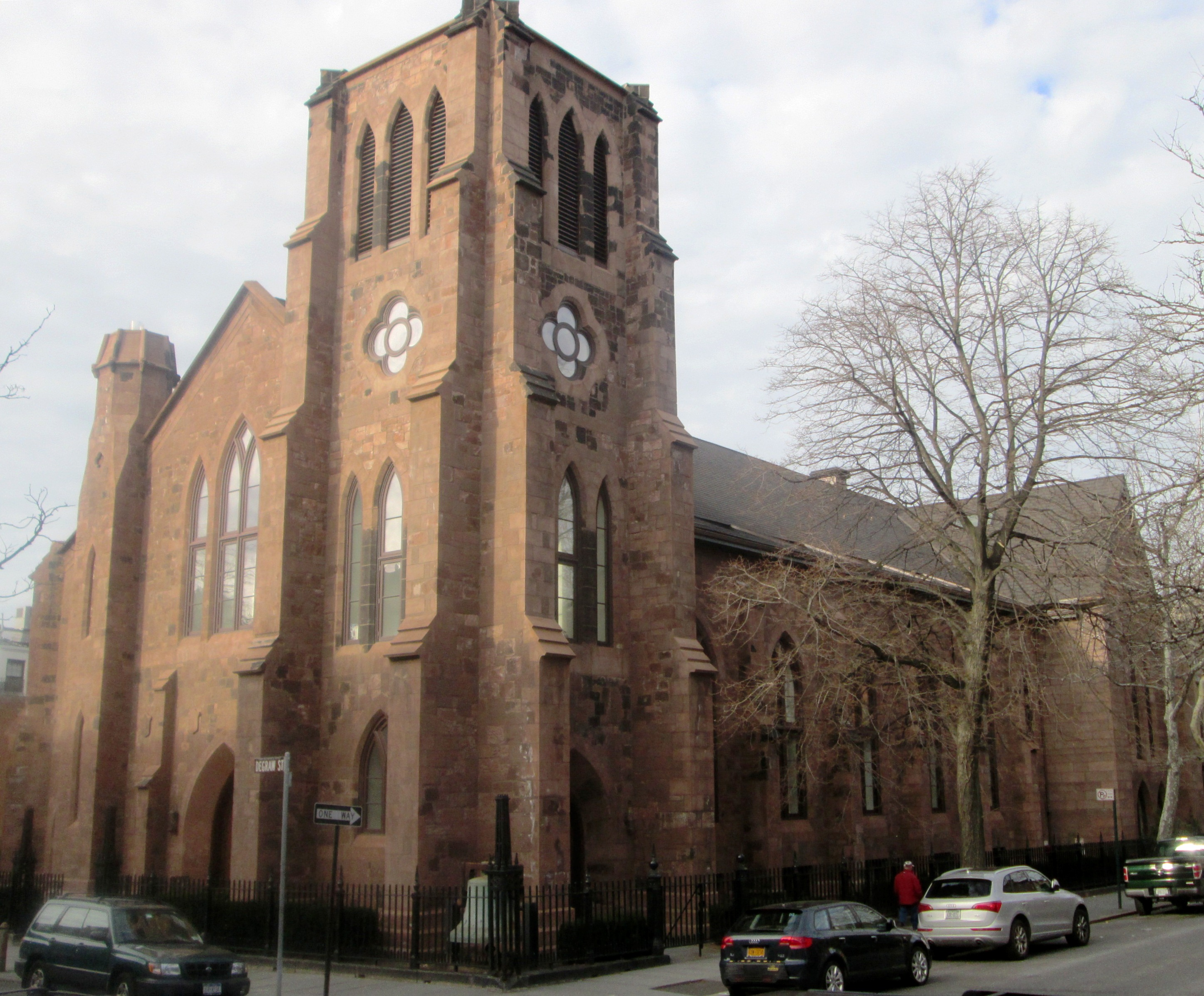
Strong Place Baptist Church by Minard Lafever, later St. Francis Cabrini Roman Catholic Chapel, now apartments (1851–52)

== See also ==
- List of New York City Designated Landmarks in Brooklyn
- National Register of Historic Places listings in Kings County, New York
