= All My Life (2020 film) =

American drama film

- Theatrical release poster
- Directed by: Marc Meyers
- Written by: Todd Rosenberg
- Based on: Jason Wilton, Boundless Productions (Boundless Weddings) Original Production [Seen at Credit Roll]
- Produced by: Todd Garner; Sean Robins
- Starring: Jessica Rothe; Harry Shum Jr.; Kyle Allen; Chrissie Fit; Jay Pharoah; Marielle Scott; Keala Settle
- Cinematography: Russ Alsobrook
- Edited by: David Moritz
- Music by: Lisbeth Scott
- Production company: Broken Road Productions
- Distributed by: Universal Pictures
- Release dates: October 23, 2020 (United Kingdom); December 4, 2020 (United States)
- Running time: 91 minutes
- Country: United States
- Language: English
- Budget: $25 million
- Box office: $2 million

All My Life is a 2020 American romantic drama film directed by Marc Meyers, from a screenplay by Todd Rosenberg, based on the true story of Solomon Chau and Jennifer Carter, a young couple that rushes to put their wedding together after Solomon is diagnosed with liver cancer. The film stars Jessica Rothe, Harry Shum Jr., Kyle Allen, Chrissie Fit, Jay Pharoah, Marielle Scott, and Keala Settle.

The film was theatrically released in the United Kingdom on October 23, 2020, and in the United States on December 4, 2020, by Universal Pictures. Critics praised the performances and chemistry of the leads, but noted the film as cliché.

== Plot ==
Jenn and her friends stop at a bar for a drink before dinner. There, they meet Sol and his friends over a short discussion of UFC and embarrassing pickup lines.

After Sol and Jenn meet up a few times, they start a seamless relationship. They move in together so he can pursue his passion to become a chef after he complains that his current job doesn't fulfill him. After analyzing his mounting bills, he decides to stay at work.

The couple host Friendsgiving, a ploy by Jenn to inspire him. Although Sol feels off, he ignores it. He whispers to Jen over a thank you toast to everyone that he put in his two weeks notice. Later in the season, he proposes with family and friends singing their favorite song. Sol starts working at Jenn's cousin Gina's successful restaurant.

One night, Sol wakes up screaming in pain. Although he has cancer, he reassures Jen that everything will be okay once he gets treatment. Sol suggests they get a dog if the news is bad.

After returning from the doctor's, he tells them that everything is fine and that the labs are good. The couple continues planning the wedding and Sol returns to the restaurant, where his dish is put on the menu.

One day, Sol texts Jen to come home and greets her with a dog named Otis, his way of telling her his cancer has returned. A few months later, he is accepted for a clinical trial. They discuss postponing the wedding, but their friends offer to throw them a quick wedding in three weeks. They fund it with the help of strangers through crowd-funding and putting up posters all over town and friends while Sol undergoes his treatment. Sol's friend Kyle misses everything because his illness reminds him of losing his dad, which he hasn't dealt with.

Sol tells Jenn about suffering from all of the drug trial's side effects, including his sense of taste. He tells her to just move on with her life, but she insists on staying by his side. Jenn and Sol get married in front of all their friends and family. Kyle finally shows up at the reception.

Jenn and Sol get his scans and are told the cancer has metastasised throughout his body. The doctor tells them he has little time left. So, Jenn and Sol work together on his eulogy.

Jenn goes to Dave and Kyle's new restaurant/bar, called Now or Never, Sol's motto. She talks about Sol and how he inspired everyone. Amanda and Megan give her Sol's honeymoon gift, which they had been keeping secret until after his death.

The flash drive contains a video of Sol, thanking Jenn for loving him during their time together. She says she will live for today for the rest of her life because of him.

== Cast ==
- Jessica Rothe as Jennifer "Jenn" Carter
- Harry Shum Jr. as Solomon "Sol" Chau
- Kyle Allen as Kyle Campbell, one of Sol's best friends
- Chrissie Fit as Amanda Fletcher, one of Jenn's friends
- Jay Pharoah as Dave Berger, one of Sol's best friends
- Marielle Scott as Megan Denhoff, one of Jenn's best friends
- Molly Hagan as Hope Carter, Jen's Mom
- Joseph Poliquin Brian, Chemo Patient
- Keala Settle as Viv Lawrence, a barista
- Michael Masini as Peter Ohl
- Greg Vrotsos as Chef Neil Snider
- Ever Carradine as Gigi Carter
- Mario Cantone as Jerome Patterson, a wedding venue manager
- Josh Brener as Eric Bronitt
- Anjali Bhimani as Mina White
- Jon Rudnitsky as Chris, a bartender
- Dan Butler as Dr. Alan Mendelson
- Lulu Cheri as Prep Chef

== Production ==
The film was announced in August 2017, with Universal Pictures distributing a script written by Todd Rosenberg. In December 2017, the film was revealed to be on that year's "Black List" of most-liked unproduced screenplays. In July 2018, it was announced Marc Meyers would direct the film. Jessica Rothe was cast that September, and Harry Shum Jr. joined the cast the following month. Michael Masini, Chrissie Fit, Greg Vrotsos, Jay Pharoah, Marielle Scott, Kyle Allen, Mario Cantone, Keala Settle, and Ever Carradine later filled out the rest of the main cast. In December 2019, Josh Brener and Jon Rudnitsky joined the cast of the film.

Principal photography took place in New Orleans from October 31 to December 20, 2019.

== Release ==
All My Life was theatrically released in the United States on December 4, 2020, by Universal Pictures, followed by a video-on-demand release on December 23. It was released in the United Kingdom on October 23, 2020.

== Reception ==
=== Box office and VOD ===
The film grossed $370,315 from 970 theaters in its opening weekend, finishing fourth at the box office. In its sophomore weekend it fell 42% to $215,000. Upon being released to digital rental platforms, the film eighth-most rented title on FandangoNow.

=== Critical response ===
On review aggregator Rotten Tomatoes, the film holds an approval rating of 59% based on 46 reviews, with an average rating of 5.1/10. The website's critics consensus reads, "All My Life benefits from some real chemistry between its leads, even if it's undermined by an aggressive reliance on heartstring-tugging sentimentality." According to Metacritic, which sampled nine critics and calculated a weighted average score of 39 out of 100, the film received "generally unfavorable" reviews. Audiences polled by CinemaScore gave the film an average grade of "B+" on an A+ to F scale, while PostTrak reported 72% of audience members gave the film a positive score, with 51% saying they would definitely recommend it.

Carlos Aguilar of The A.V. Club gave the film a "D−" and wrote: "All My Life is too passionless to earn even a begrudged sniffle. It's all paint-by-numbers, from the requisite 'screaming inside a car' shot expressing a character's frustrations to the store-bought spontaneity of a couple jumping into a fountain fully clothed."

However, Steve Pond of TheWrap noted that "All My Life is nothing if not pleasant and amiable as it makes its way down the road to heartwarming" and Courtney Howard of Variety wrote "The warmth and touching tenderness of All My Life melts even the coldest of hearts in its quest to deliver happy and sad tears. Unlike the phony, syrupy, and predictably manipulative devices of a Nicholas Sparks romance, this three-hankie weepie holds a surprising amount of heart and hope to accompany all the cathartic crying."
