= Cobble Hill Towers =

Apartment complex in New York City, US

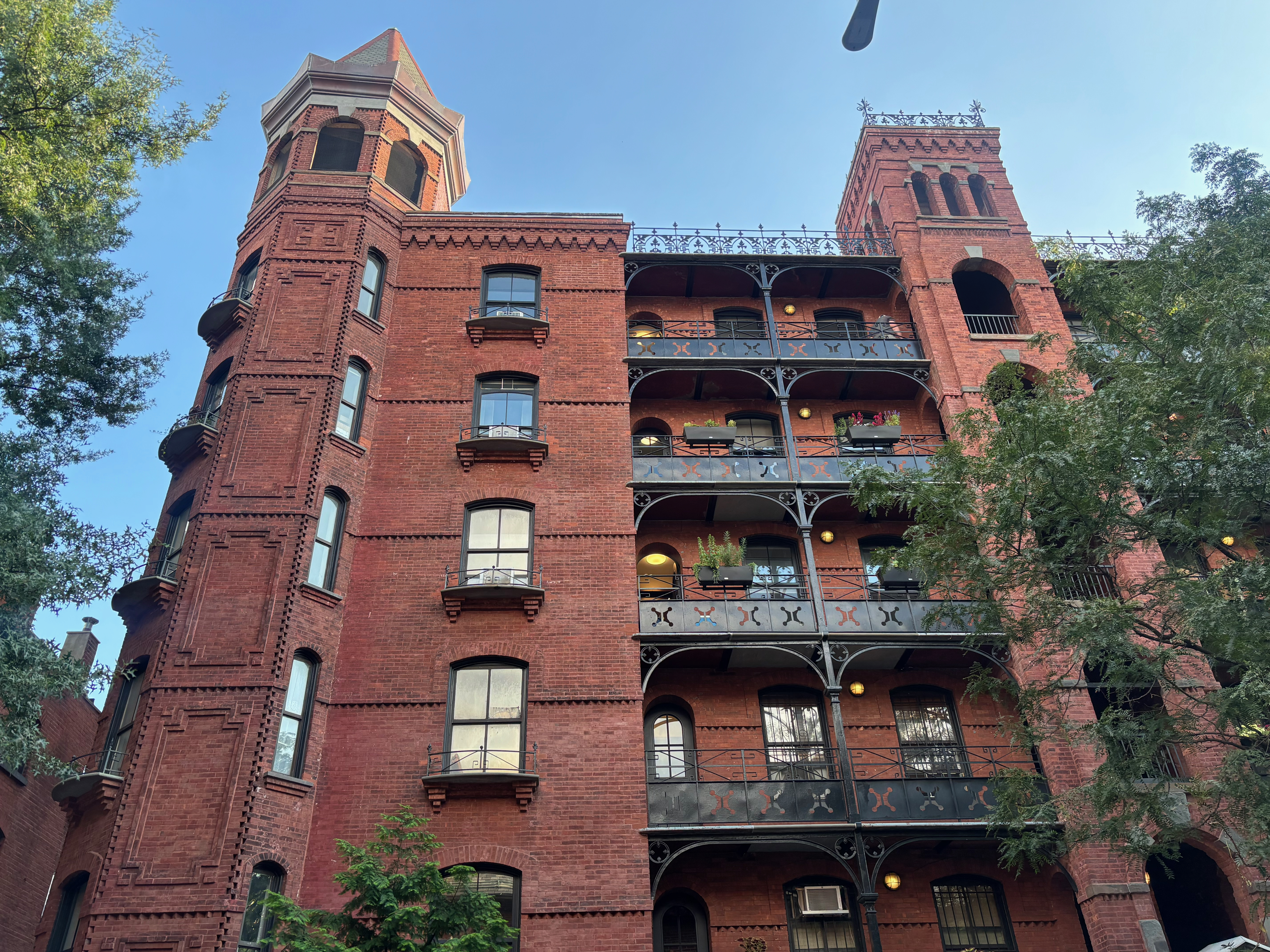
- Interactive map of the Cobble Hill Towers area

General information
- Status: Completed
- Location: 431 Hicks Street, Brooklyn, New York, U.S.
- Coordinates: 40°41′17″N 73°59′56″W
- Construction started: 1876
- Renovated: 2008

Design and construction
- Architect: Alfred Tredway White

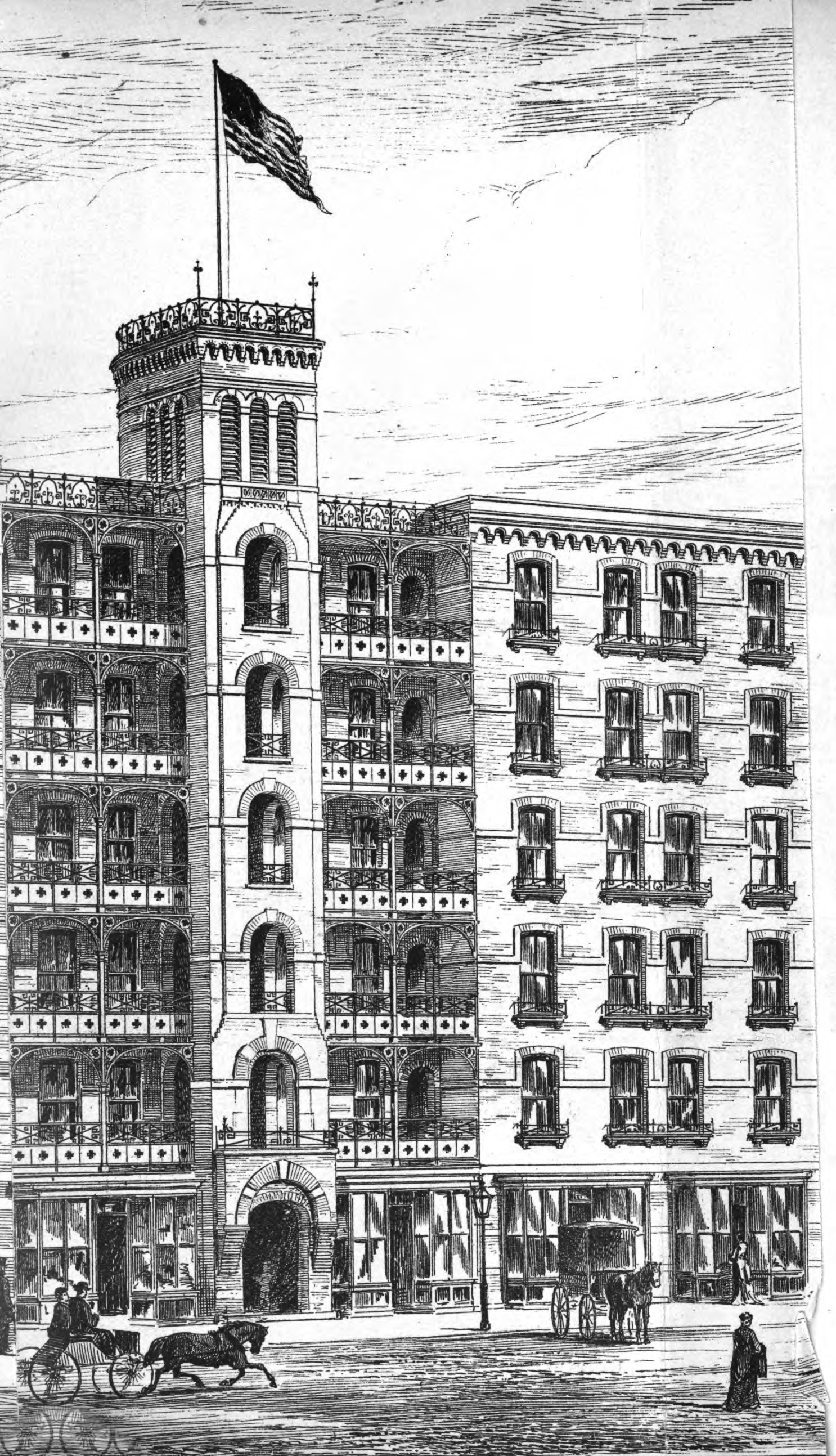
Tower Building (Hicks Street), 1891

Cobble Hill Towers is an apartment complex in the Cobble Hill neighborhood of Brooklyn, New York City. It was built between 1876 and 1879 and was designed as one of the earliest housing projects in the country. Previously known as the Tower and Home Buildings, they were developed by Alfred Tredway White and the architects William Field & Sons. Consisting of nine six-story buildings, notable architectural features include two courtyards, outdoor staircases meant as a fire safety measure and Victorian spires. Known at the turn of the 20th century as the "most famous model tenement enterprises in America," the buildings began conversion into condominiums in 2008.
