= Odd Todd =

- Created by: Todd Rosenberg

Original release
- Release: 2001

Odd Todd is a website owned and operated by Todd Rosenberg, who has created a series of humorous Flash cartoons depicting the world of unemployment, after becoming unemployed himself.

Rosenberg's first cartoon, Laid Off: A Day in the Life, humorously deals with frustration, despair, and boredom of an unemployed man in his 30s, a situation shared by many in the Silicon Valley after the dot com crash. After visitors contributed several thousand dollars through the website's "Tip Cup" link, the New York State Department of Labor attempted to revoke Rosenberg's unemployment benefits on the grounds that the site constituted a business. In July 2002, a judge ruled that Rosenberg did not have to return the benefits he had received.

His cartoon character was picked up for development at Comedy Central for a half-hour television show but was downgraded to a web series. His book, The Odd Todd Handbook was published in 2003 by Warner Books.

Rosenberg now works as a screenwriter, with his first film being the 2020 film All My Life.
