= Alfred Tredway White =

American housing reformer and philanthropist

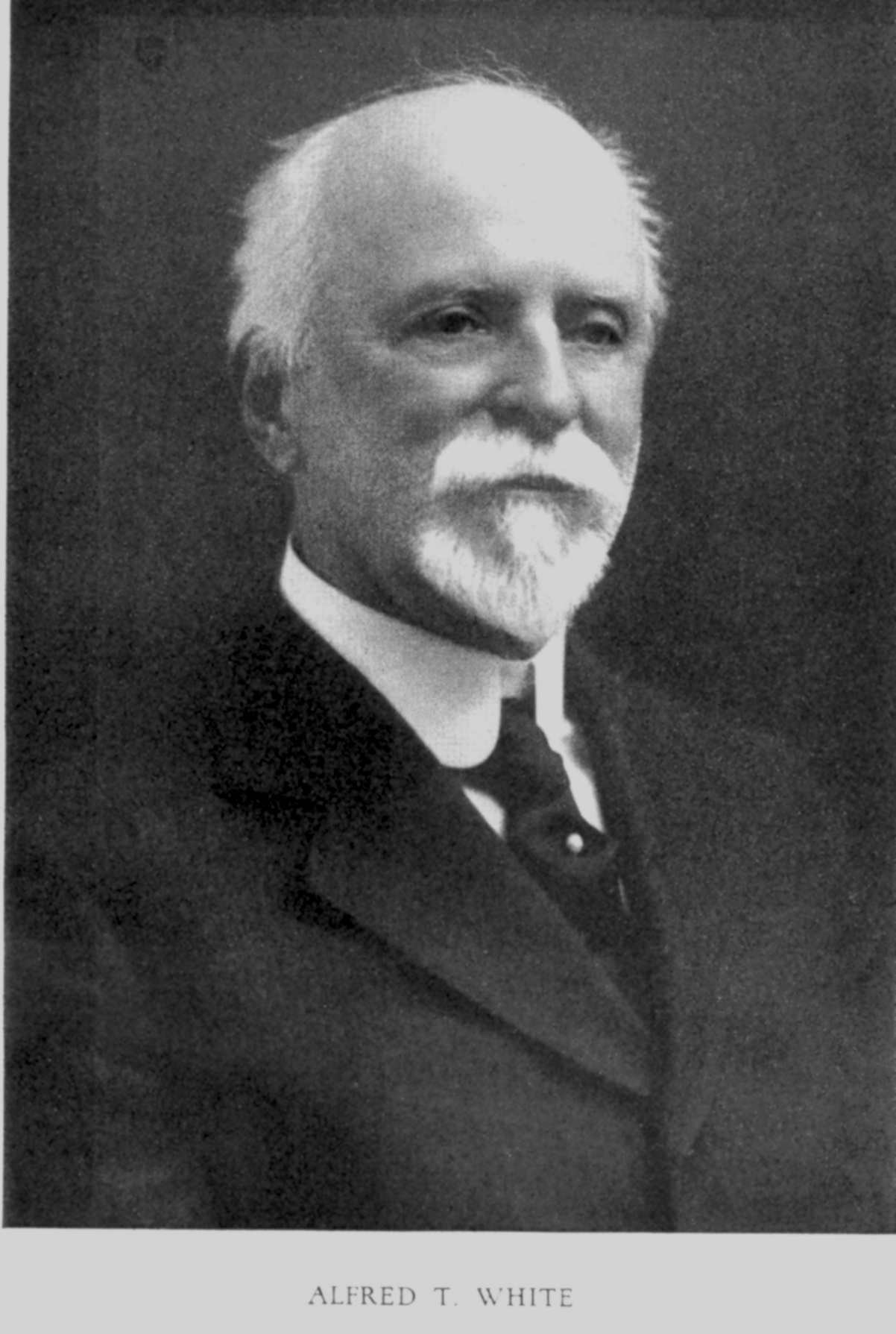
- Born: May 28, 1846; Brooklyn, New York
- Died: January 29, 1921 (aged 74); Central Valley, New York, USA
- Known for: Social reform, philanthropy
- Children: Annie Jean Van Sinderen

Alfred Tredway White (May 28, 1846 – January 29, 1921) was an American housing reformer and philanthropist, and was known as "Brooklyn's first citizen." After graduating from Rensselaer Polytechnic Institute in 1865 with a degree in civil engineering, he developed the Home Buildings (1877), Tower Buildings (1879, now Cobble Hill Towers) and the Riverside Buildings (1890). He advocated a model of "philanthropy plus five percent," accepting a limited financial return on his projects.

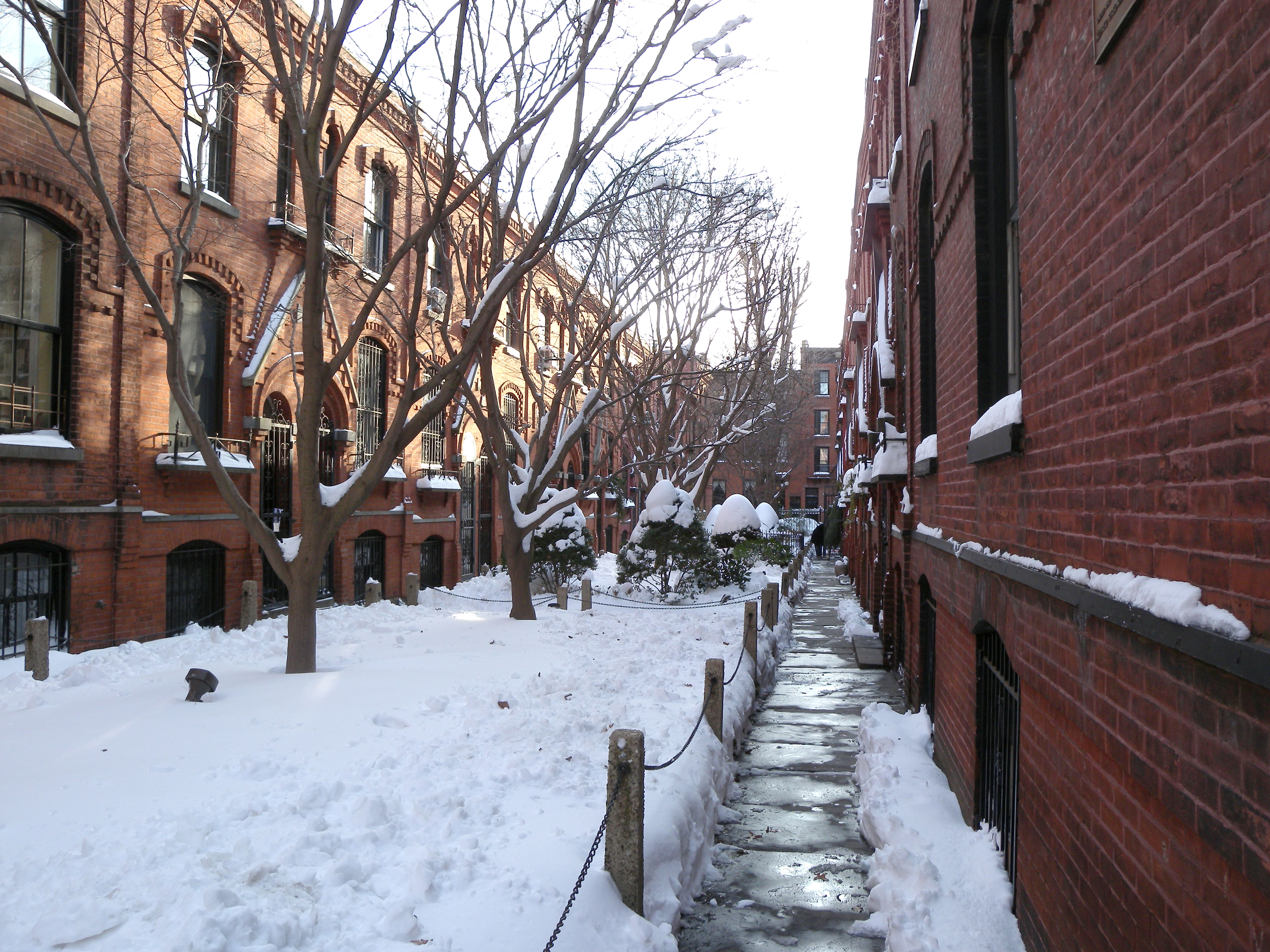
"Workingman's Cottages" conceived by White as low-cost housing in 1876 (2009).

White's buildings were extensively praised by pioneering photo journalist Jacob Riis in his 1890 work, "How The Other Half Lives", as a "beau ideal" and a "big village of contented people." They covered roughly half of their lots, leaving large courtyards suitable for concerts and other recreation.

He served as Commissioner of City Works for Brooklyn during the administration of Mayor Schieren.

He was an early benefactor of the Brooklyn Botanic Garden, and is memorialized there by the Alfred T. White Memorial and Amphitheater. He was also a major supporter of both the Hampton Institute and Tuskegee Institute. He was a member of the Unitarian Universalist church.

White died in 1921 at age 74 while skating alone on Forest Lake; he broke through the ice and was drowned. Even with his commitment to generous philanthropy, he left behind an estate worth $15 million (equivalent to $270.76 million in 2025).
