= Climate of Krasnodar =

Krasnodar's climate is subtropical (Mediterranean type with a uniform distribution of precipitation over the seasons), transitional from temperate continental. The air masses of temperate latitudes prevail throughout the year, and tropical air often enters in the summer. According to the Köppen climate classification, Krasnodar's climate corresponds to the Cfa zone.

== General characteristics ==
The air masses of temperate latitudes prevail over this territory: they have the highest frequency in the winter months (82%), the lowest in the summer months (62%). Incursions of Arctic air are very rare. Any period of the year is characterized by the intrusion of hot air (the effect of a thermal dome). The climate of Krasnodar is characterized by sudden weather changes, especially air temperatures.

The city's climate is characterized by long hot summers and mild winters. Transitional seasons are poorly expressed. Winter begins in early January, and is usually mild, with frequent and intense thaws. Warm weather is often observed in the first half of January. The average long-term winter duration is 40 days. Average monthly temperatures range from +7° to -5°. The annual average minimum in winter is -15.9 °C, the absolute minimum was observed in January and was -36 °C in 1935. In winter, precipitation usually falls in the form of rain, rarely snow. Stable snow cover is extremely rare.

Spring begins in the last decade of February. At its beginning, it rarely cools down to -3...-5 °C. The transition of the average daily air temperature through 5 °C occurs in mid-March; the growing season of plants begins.

The climatic summer (the transition of the average daily air temperature through 15 °C) is established in the first decade of May and lasts almost until the end of September. Summers are hot and mostly dry. The maximum temperature in some years can reach +42 °C. Summer is the longest season in Krasnodar and lasts for 5 months. Summer precipitation is mostly short-lived, characterized by showers with thunderstorms, sometimes accompanied by hail. Krasnodar's summer is characterized by long periods without rain, accompanied by droughts and dry spells.

Nights are often tropical (temperatures above 20 degrees), and when a number of meteorological conditions are observed, namely a large and powerful anticyclone in the European part of Russia and a baric minimum in the Black Sea region, favorable conditions develop for a permanent easterly, northeasterly wind from the western part of Kazakhstan, which passes and picks up hot air masses also through territories of the Astrakhan region and Kalmykia. With a minimum of humidity and high temperature, this wind does not allow the temperature in the city to drop at night due to the weekly penetration of humidity from the Black Sea coast, and, accordingly, cooling. Nights with a minimum temperature of 26 degrees inside the urban area were recorded. This effect made it possible to update dozens of day and night temperature records in the northern Black Sea region in 2024.

Autumn comes around the middle of October. Clear and warm weather prevails in early autumn. Cases of thermal invasion from North Africa and the Middle East are not uncommon. By the end of autumn, the number of cloudy days and precipitation increases.

The first frosts fall in early to mid-November. The amount of precipitation in the autumn months is gradually increasing. Strong winds are typical in November. 700-750 mm of precipitation falls per year. The maximum precipitation is observed in June and in November-December, the minimum is in August. December is the rainy season in the city. Average annual temperature +12.7. The average annual air humidity is 71 %

=== Air temperature ===
The average air temperature in Krasnodar, according to long-term observations, is +12.7 °C (in the last 10 years, the average annual temperature has been at 13 °C). The coldest month in the city is January with an average temperature of +0.8 °C. The warmest month is July, with an average daily temperature of +24.1 °C. The highest temperature recorded in Krasnodar for the entire observation period is +42 °C, and the lowest is -36.0 °C.

Record temperatures
Month	Jan	Feb	Mar	Аpr	May	Jun	Jul	Aug	Sep	Oct	Nov	Dec
Record high, °C	20,8 (1971)	23,1 (2023)	29,9 (2025)	34,7 (1998)	35,1 (2014)	39,3 (2018)	40,7 (2000)	42,0 (1930)	38,5 (2010)	33,9 (1998)	30,0 (1932)	23,0 (2012)
Record low, °C	−36,0 (1935)	−33,0 (1929)	−25,5 (1985)	−10,0 (1916)	−2,0 (1915)	4,2 (1958)	8,0 (1926)	3,9 (1950)	−2,2 (1970)	−9,9 (1951)	−23,0 (1931)	−29,0 (1933)

Maximum and minimum monthly average temperature
Month	Jan	Feb	Маr	Аpr	Маy	Jun	Jul	Aug	Sep	Оct	Nov	Dec
The warmest, °C	7,5 (1915)	7,1 (2016)	10,0 (2008)	17,0 (2024)	21,7 (2013)	25,3 (2019)	28,2 (2024)	27,7 (2006)	23,2 (2015)	16,8 (2012)	12,0 (2010)	7,2 (2010)
The coldest, °C	−10,8 (1972)	−13,1 (1954)	−3,7 (1929)	7,2 (1929)	13,3 (1919)	17,6 (1933)	20,6 (1956)	19,4 (1984)	13,9 (1884)	6,4 (1951)	−4,0 (1993)	−7,0 (1920)

=== Sunshine ===
Mean monthly sunlight hours
Month	Jan	Feb	Маr	Apr	Маy	Jun	Jul	Aug	Sep	Oct	Now	Dec	Year
Sunshine,h	71	85	136	180	248	276	304	285	237	174	87	56	2139

=== Precipitation, relative humidity, and cloud cover ===
The average annual precipitation in Krasnodar is about 735 mm. The air humidity is about 72%, in summer — 64-66%, and in winter — 78-80%.

Relative humidity of the air
Month	Jan	Feb	Маr	Apr	Маy	Jun	Jul	Aug	Sep	Oct	Nov	Dec	Year
Air humidity, %	81	76	72	66	66	68	63	62	68	75	81	82	72

Precipitation falls approximately evenly throughout the year, with a small difference between the maximum and minimum. The absolute maximum is in June (86 mm), with a secondary maximum in December (77 mm). The minimum precipitation falls in August (44 mm). During the year, the average number of days with precipitation is about 134 (from 9 days in August to 19 days in December). The rainiest month was June 1988, when 307 mm of precipitation fell (with a norm of 86 mm). August turned out to be the driest month twice in 2014 and 2023, when there was no precipitation at all.

Number of days with precipitation
Month	Jan	Feb	Mar	Apr	May	Jun	Jul	Aug	Sep	Oct	Nov	Dec	Year
Solid (snow)	6	6	3	0,1	0	0	0	0	0	0,1	2	5	22
Mixed (sleet)	5	4	0,2	0	0	0	0	0	0	0,3	2	4	19
Liquid (rain)	8	7	11	15	14	14	10	9	10	12	13	11	134

The lower cloud cover is 3.8 points, the total cloud cover is 6.1 points.

Cloud cover
Month	Jan	Feb	Mar	Apr	May	Jun	Jul	Aug	Sep	Oct	Now	Dec	Year
Total cloud cover, points	7,8	7,1	7,1	6,7	6,0	5,5	4,1	3,7	4,6	5,5	7,1	7,8	6,1
Lower cloud cover, points	5,6	4,6	4,4	3,7	3,2	3,1	2,3	2,0	2,6	3,4	4,8	5,8	3,8

The number of clear, cloudy and cloudy days, taking into account the lower clouds
Month	Jan	Feb	Mar	Apr	May	Jun	Jul	Aug	Sep	Oct	Nov	Dec	Year
Clear days	6	8	10	10	13	10	16	18	15	13	9	6	134
Cloudy days	15	14	16	16	16	19	14	13	14	14	13	14	178
Overcast days	10	6	5	4	2	1	1	0	1	4	8	11	53

=== Wind speed ===
The average wind speed in the city is 2.4 m/s.

Wind speed
Month	Jan	Feb	Mar	Apr	May	Jun	Jul	Aug	Sep	Oct	Nov	Dec	Year
Wind speed, m/s	2,6	2,9	3,0	2,8	2,4	2,2	2,1	2,0	2,1	2,1	2,3	2,5	2,4

=== Atmospheric phenomena ===
Number of days with different phenomena
Month	Jan	Feb	Mar	Apr	May	Jun	Jul	Aug	Sep	Oct	Nov	Dec	Year
Thunderstorm	0,2	0,1	0,2	1	4	8	6	5	4	1	1	0,1	31
Fog	6	4	3	2	2	1	1	1	4	5	6	7	42
Mist	0,03	0,1	0,2	0,03	0,03	0,03	0,1	0,2	0	0	0,03	0	1
Dust storm	0	0	0	0,1	0	0	0,03	0,03	0,1	0,1	0	0	0,4
Snowstorm	0,3	0,3	0,03	0	0	0	0	0	0	0	0,1	0,1	1
Black ice	1	1	0,3	0	0	0	0	0	0	0,1	0,2	1	4

=== Snow cover ===
Snow cover
Month	Jan	Feb	Mar	Apr	May	Jun	Jul	Aug	Sep	Oct	Nov	Dec	Year
Number of days	4	5	1	0	0	0	0	0	0	0,2	1	4	22
Average height, cm	3	4	1	0	0	0	0	0	0	0	1	2	4
Maximum height, cm	40	49	35	0	0	0	0	0	8	9	36	34	49

== Climatogram ==
Climate data for Krasnodar (1991–2020, extremes 1881–present)
Month	Jan	Feb	Mar	Apr	May	Jun	Jul	Aug	Sep	Oct	Nov	Dec	Year
Record high °C (°F)	20.8 (69.4)	23.1 (73.6)	29.9 (85.8)	34.7 (94.5)	35.1 (95.2)	39.3 (102.7)	40.7 (105.3)	40.0 (104.0)	38.5 (101.3)	33.9 (93.0)	28.5 (83.3)	23.0 (73.4)	40.7 (105.3)
Mean daily maximum °C (°F)	4.5 (40.1)	6.7 (44.1)	11.8 (53.2)	18.6 (65.5)	23.9 (75.0)	28.2 (82.8)	31.1 (88.0)	31.4 (88.5)	25.6 (78.1)	19.0 (66.2)	11.2 (52.2)	6.4 (43.5)	18.2 (64.8)
Daily mean °C (°F)	0.8 (33.4)	1.9 (35.4)	6.5 (43.7)	12.4 (54.3)	17.9 (64.2)	22.2 (72.0)	24.9 (76.8)	24.7 (76.5)	19.2 (66.6)	12.9 (55.2)	6.3 (43.3)	2.4 (36.3)	12.7 (54.9)
Mean daily minimum °C (°F)	−1.9 (28.6)	−1.5 (29.3)	2.7 (36.9)	7.4 (45.3)	12.9 (55.2)	17.0 (62.6)	19.4 (66.9)	18.9 (66.0)	13.8 (56.8)	8.4 (47.1)	2.9 (37.2)	−0.4 (31.3)	8.3 (46.9)
Record low °C (°F)	−32.9 (−27.2)	−29.8 (−21.6)	−25.5 (−13.9)	−5.6 (21.9)	−1.2 (29.8)	4.2 (39.6)	9.5 (49.1)	3.9 (39.0)	−2.2 (28.0)	−9.9 (14.2)	−20.4 (−4.7)	−27.6 (−17.7)	−32.9 (−27.2)
Average precipitation mm (inches)	65 (2.6)	53 (2.1)	65 (2.6)	49 (1.9)	65 (2.6)	80 (3.1)	66 (2.6)	41 (1.6)	51 (2.0)	61 (2.4)	66 (2.6)	69 (2.7)	731 (28.8)
Average extreme snow depth cm (inches)	3 (1.2)	4 (1.6)	1 (0.4)	0 (0)	0 (0)	0 (0)	0 (0)	0 (0)	0 (0)	0 (0)	1 (0.4)	2 (0.8)	4 (1.6)
Average rainy days	13	11	14	15	14	14	10	8	10	12	14	15	150
Average snowy days	11	10	6	0.3	0	0	0	0	0	0	3	9	39
Average relative humidity (%)	81	76	72	66	66	68	63	62	68	75	81	82	72
Mean monthly sunshine hours	71	84	136	181	247	277	303	286	238	173	88	55	2,139
Source 1: Погода и Климат
Source 2: NOAA (sun, 1961–1990)

== See also ==
- Climate of Sochi
- Climate of New York

== Sources ==
- Климат Краснодара [Climate of Krasnodar] (PDF) (in Russian). Leningrad: Гидрометеоиздат. 1990. ISBN 5-286-00600-0.
