= Climate of New York City =

New York

Climate chart (precipitation, max. and min. temperature)
J	F	M	A	M	J	J	A	S	O	N	D
3.6 40 28	3.2 42 30	4.3 50 36	4.1 62 46	4 71 55	4.5 80 64	4.6 85 70	4.6 83 69	4.3 76 62	4.4 65 51	3.6 54 42	4.4 44 34
- █ Average max. and min. temperatures in °F
- █ Precipitation totals in inches
- Source: "New York City Weatherbox NOAA"
Metric conversion
J	F	M	A	M	J	J	A	S	O	N	D
92 4 −2	81 6 −1	109 10 2	104 17 8	101 22 13	115 27 18	117 29 21	116 29 21	109 25 17	111 18 11	91 12 6	111 7 1
- █ Average max. and min. temperatures in °C
- █ Precipitation totals in mm

According to the Köppen climate classification, New York City features a humid subtropical climate (Cfa). The city experiences long, hot, humid summers with frequent late day thundershowers, and moderately cold winters, with snow or a mix of snow and rain on occasion. New York's location in the southernmost part of the state, its proximity to the Atlantic Ocean, and its large population (and, consequentially, a strong urban heat island effect) all shape its climate. Thus, New York City has a marginal humid subtropical climate, in contrast to the rest of the state, which features a humid continental climate; and the New York metropolitan area's coastline constitutes one of the fastest-warming urban ocean shorelines in the world.

Meteorological records have been kept at Central Park since 1821, although the station was relocated to a different part of the park on January 1, 1920. There are also other weather stations in the area, including one at LaGuardia Airport, beginning in 1940, and at JFK Airport, beginning in 1948. However, due to Central Park's long records and central location, it is often considered the main station for the city. Hence, all records unless otherwise stated will be for this station.

The highest temperature ever observed in Central Park is 106 °F (41 °C) on July 9, 1936 - although LaGuardia reported 107 °F (42 °C) on July 3, 1966, and the lowest is −15 °F (−26 °C) on February 9, 1934. The lowest daily maximum is 2 °F (−17 °C) on December 30, 1917. The highest daily minimum at Central Park is 87 °F (31 °C) on July 2, 1903.

The averages 1,100 to 1,200 millimetres (42 to 49 inches) of precipitation annually, with snowfall averaging 29.8 in (75.7 cm) per year but is highly variable between winter seasons. The city can also be prone to strong winds, being a coastal location it is exposed to the Atlantic. Hurricane Hazel in 1954 produced a wind gust of 134 km/h (83 mph), while a gust of 78 miles per hour (126 km/h) being reported on December 2, 1974. Governors Island, Manhattan, in New York Harbor, is planned to host a US$1 billion research and education center poised to make New York City the global leader in addressing the climate crisis.

== Classifications ==
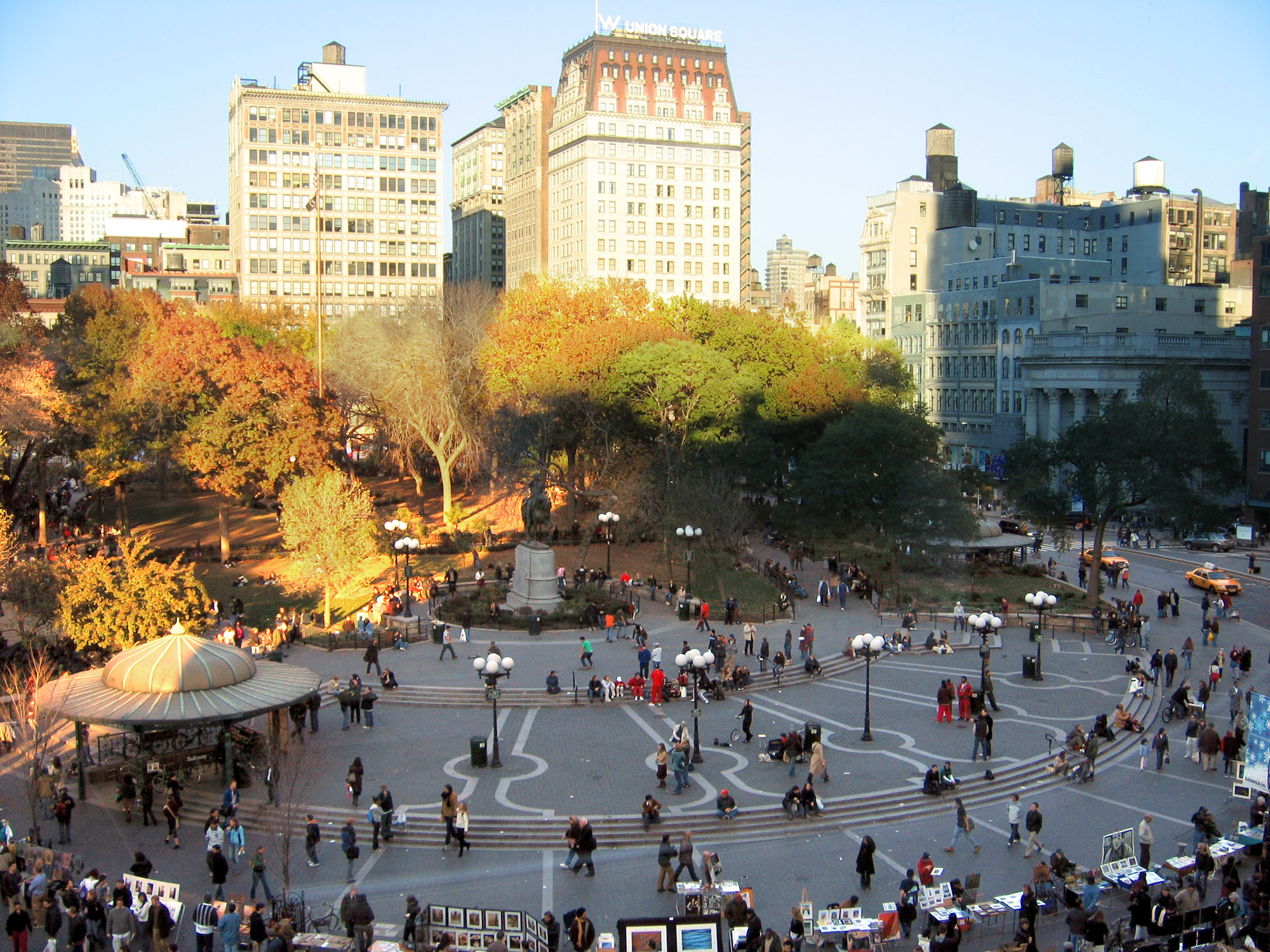
Union Square in autumn

New York City falls under different climate types depending on the climate classification system used. However, the Köppen climate classification system is the most widely used climate classification scheme, in which New York City falls under the humid subtropical zone.

New York City Climate according to major climate systems
Climatic scheme	Initials	Description
Köppen system	Cfa	Humid subtropical climate
Trewartha system	Do	Temperate oceanic climate
Alisov system	—N/a	Temperate climate
Strahler system	—N/a	Moist continental climate
Thornthwaite system	C2 B'1	Moist subhumid mesothermal climate
Neef system	—N/a	East-side temperate climate

In the Holdridge life zones system, having a mean annual biotemperature above 53.6 °F (12 °C) and mean annual precipitation above 39.4 inches (1,000 mm), New York City features a warm temperate moist forest climate. By the Trewartha classification, the city is defined as having a Temperate climate (Dc). Annually, the city averages 234 days with at least some sunshine. The USDA plant hardiness zones are 7a and 7b. Most of the city is found in 7b, with forested areas and parks being in 7a, as shown in Staten Island and suburban areas. The city also has some small densely populated areas in 8a, like around LaGuardia airport.

== Temperature ==
The city's annual temperature profile consists of a warm to hot season from May through October, and a cool to cold period from November through April. However, due to its proximity to the Atlantic Ocean, these swings are less significant than areas further inland. The Atlantic serves as a moderator of the temperature meaning the city is milder than areas inland during the winter and cooler during the summer. All extremes are for the Central Park station.

=== Averages ===
In an average year, the temperature will usually be between 8 °F (−13 °C) and 97 °F (36 °C) with temperatures greatly exceeding these values being uncommon. Temperatures at or above 100 °F (38 °C) and below 0 °F (−18 °C) are very rare, with the latest occurrences being July 2, 2026 and February 14, 2016, respectively.

Climate data for New York (Belvedere Castle, Central Park), 1991–2020 normals
Month	Jan	Feb	Mar	Apr	May	Jun	Jul	Aug	Sep	Oct	Nov	Dec	Year
Mean maximum °F (°C)	60.4 (15.8)	60.7 (15.9)	70.3 (21.3)	82.9 (28.3)	88.5 (31.4)	92.1 (33.4)	95.7 (35.4)	93.4 (34.1)	89.0 (31.7)	79.7 (26.5)	70.7 (21.5)	62.9 (17.2)	95.7 (35.4)
Mean daily maximum °F (°C)	39.5 (4.2)	42.2 (5.7)	49.9 (9.9)	61.8 (16.6)	71.4 (21.9)	79.7 (26.5)	84.9 (29.4)	83.3 (28.5)	76.2 (24.6)	64.5 (18.1)	54.0 (12.2)	44.3 (6.8)	62.6 (17.0)
Daily mean °F (°C)	33.7 (0.9)	35.9 (2.2)	42.8 (6.0)	53.7 (12.1)	63.2 (17.3)	72.0 (22.2)	77.5 (25.3)	76.1 (24.5)	69.2 (20.7)	57.9 (14.4)	48.0 (8.9)	39.1 (3.9)	55.8 (13.2)
Mean daily minimum °F (°C)	27.9 (−2.3)	29.5 (−1.4)	35.8 (2.1)	45.5 (7.5)	55.0 (12.8)	64.4 (18.0)	70.1 (21.2)	68.9 (20.5)	62.3 (16.8)	51.4 (10.8)	42.0 (5.6)	33.8 (1.0)	48.9 (9.4)
Mean minimum °F (°C)	9.8 (−12.3)	12.7 (−10.7)	19.7 (−6.8)	32.8 (0.4)	43.9 (6.6)	52.7 (11.5)	61.8 (16.6)	60.3 (15.7)	50.2 (10.1)	38.4 (3.6)	27.7 (−2.4)	18.0 (−7.8)	7.7 (−13.5)
Source: NOAA

=== Highest daily temperatures ===
Period	Record temperature	Date
January	72 °F (22 °C)	Jan 6, 2007; Jan 26, 1950
February	78 °F (26 °C)	Feb 21, 2018
March	86 °F (30 °C)	Mar 31, 1998; Mar 29, 1945
April	96 °F (36 °C)	Apr 17, 2002; Apr 18, 1976
May	99 °F (37 °C)	May 19, 1962
June	101 °F (38 °C)	Jun 27, 1966; Jun 29, 1934
July	106 °F (41 °C)	Jul 9, 1936
August	104 °F (40 °C)	Aug 7, 1918
September	102 °F (39 °C)	Sep 2, 1953
October	94 °F (34 °C)	Oct 5, 1941
November	84 °F (29 °C)	Nov 1, 1950
December	75 °F (24 °C)	Dec 7, 1998

=== Lowest daily temperatures ===
Period	Record temperature	Date
January	−6 °F (−21 °C)	Jan 24, 1882
February	−15 °F (−26 °C)	Feb 9, 1934
March	3 °F (−16 °C)	Mar 5, 1872
April	12 °F (−11 °C)	Apr 1, 1923
May	32 °F (0 °C)	May 6, 1891
June	44 °F (7 °C)	Jun 1, 1945
July	52 °F (11 °C)	Jul 1, 1943
August	50 °F (10 °C)	Aug 29, 1986; Aug 29, 1982; Aug 31, 1976; Aug 29–30, 1965; Aug 27–28, 1885
September	39 °F (4 °C)	Sep 30, 1912
October	28 °F (−2 °C)	Oct 27, 1936
November	5 °F (−15 °C)	Nov 30, 1875
December	−13 °F (−25 °C)	Dec 30, 1917

=== Daily record warm minimum ===
Period	Record temperature	Date
January	59 °F (15 °C)	Jan 4, 1950
February	58 °F (14 °C)	Feb 24, 2017
March	66 °F (19 °C)	Mar 31, 1998
April	76 °F (24 °C)	Apr 18, 2002
May	76 °F (24 °C)	May 31, 1987
June	81 °F (27 °C)	Jun 25, 2025; Jun 24, 2025; Jun 26, 1952
July	84 °F (29 °C)	Jul 22, 2011; Jul 15, 1995; Jul 7, 1908
August	84 °F (29 °C)	Aug 14, 1908
September	79 °F (26 °C)	Sep 7, 1881
October	75 °F (24 °C)	Oct 5, 1898; Oct 4, 1898
November	67 °F (19 °C)	Nov 2, 1971
December	63 °F (17 °C)	Dec 24, 2015

=== Daily record cold maxima ===
Period	Record temperature	Date
January	6 °F (−14 °C)	Jan 24, 1882
February	4 °F (−16 °C)	Feb 5, 1918
March	10 °F (−12 °C)	Mar 5, 1872
April	30 °F (−1 °C)	Apr 7, 1982; Apr 5, 1881
May	43 °F (6 °C)	May 5, 1891; May 3, 1873
June	52 °F (11 °C)	Jun 2, 1946; Jun 4, 1945; Jun 2, 1907
July	61 °F (16 °C)	Jul 6, 1956
August	59 °F (15 °C)	Aug 21, 2007; Aug 31, 1911
September	51 °F (11 °C)	Sep 19, 1875
October	38 °F (3 °C)	Oct 30, 1925
November	14 °F (−10 °C)	Nov 30, 1875
December	2 °F (−17 °C)	Dec 30, 1917

=== Highest averages ===
Period	Record mean	Year
Year	58.0 °F (14.4 °C)	2023
Spring (March–May)	57.1 °F (13.9 °C)	2010
Summer (June–August)	77.8 °F (25.4 °C)	2010
Autumn (September–November)	61.8 °F (16.6 °C)	1931, 2015
Winter (December–February)	41.5 °F (5.3 °C)	2001–2002
January	43.5 °F (6.4 °C)	2023
February	42.0 °F (5.6 °C)	2018
March	51.1 °F (10.6 °C)	1945
April	57.9 °F (14.4 °C)	2010
May	68.7 °F (20.4 °C)	1991
June	76.2 °F (24.6 °C)	1943
July	81.4 °F (27.4 °C)	1999 (Note: Before official records began, the mean temperature of July 1999 equalled the mean temperature of July 1825.)
August	80.3 °F (26.8 °C)	1980
September	74.5 °F (23.6 °C)	2015
October	64.1 °F (17.8 °C)	2017
November	53.0 °F (11.7 °C)	2020
December	50.8 °F (10.4 °C)	2015

=== Lowest averages ===
Period	Record mean	Year
Year	49.3 °F (9.6 °C)	1888 (Note: Before official records began, the mean temperature of 1836 was 47.2 °F (8.4 °C), beating the record from 1888. Additionally, 1837 also beat 1888, with a mean temperature of 49.2 °F (9.6 °C))
Spring (March–May)	44.7 °F (7.1 °C)	1888
Summer (June–August)	69.3 °F (20.7 °C)	1903 (Note: Before official records began, the mean temperature of summer 1837 was 67.5 °F (19.7 °C), beating the record from summer 1903. Additionally, the summers of 1836 and 1839 also beat 1903, with mean temperatures of 67.7 °F (19.8 °C) and 69.1 °F (20.6 °C) respectively.)
Autumn (September–November)	51.7 °F (10.9 °C)	1871 (Note: Before official records began, the mean temperature of autumn 1836 was 49.5 °F (9.7 °C), beating the record from autumn 1871. Additionally, the autumn of 1823 also beat 1871, with a mean temperature of 51.3 °F (10.7 °C).)
Winter (December–February)	25.7 °F (−3.5 °C)	1917–1918 (Note: Before official records began, the mean temperature of winter 1867–1868 was 25.5 °F (−3.6 °C), beating the record from winter 1917–1918.)
January	21.7 °F (−5.7 °C)	1918 (Note: Before official records began, the mean temperature of January 1857 was 19.6 °F (−6.9 °C), beating the record from January 1918 as well as being the coldest month of any kind ever recorded.)
February	19.9 °F (−6.7 °C)	1934
March	30.0 °F (−1.1 °C)	1888
April	41.1 °F (5.1 °C)	1874
May	54.3 °F (12.4 °C)	1917 (Note: Before official records began, the mean temperature of May 1917 was equalled by May 1850.)
June	64.2 °F (17.9 °C)	1903 (Note: Before official records began, the mean temperature of June 1836 was 62.2 °F (16.8 °C), beating the record from June 1903. The mean temperature of June 1903 was also beaten by June 1839, with a mean temperature of 63.3 °F (17.4 °C).)
July	70.7 °F (21.5 °C)	1888 (Note: Before official records began, the mean temperature of July 1837 was 69.4 °F (20.8 °C), beating the record from July 1888.)
August	68.5 °F (20.3 °C)	1927 (Note: Before official records began, the mean temperature of August 1836 was 67.8 °F (19.9 °C), beating the record from August 1927. The mean temperature of August 1927 was also beaten by August 1866, with a mean temperature of 68.4 °F (20.2 °C). The mean temperature of August 1927 was also equalled by August 1837.)
September	60.8 °F (16.0 °C)	1871 (Note: Before official records began, the mean temperature of September 1835 was 60.6 °F (15.9 °C), beating the record from September 1871.)
October	48.6 °F (9.2 °C)	1888 (Note: Before official records began, the mean temperature of October 1836 was 45.8 °F (7.7 °C), beating the record from October 1888.)
November	37.0 °F (2.8 °C)	1873
December	24.9 °F (−3.9 °C)	1876 (Note: Before official records began, the mean temperature of December 1831 was 22.3 °F (−5.4 °C), beating the record from December 1876.)

== Precipitation ==
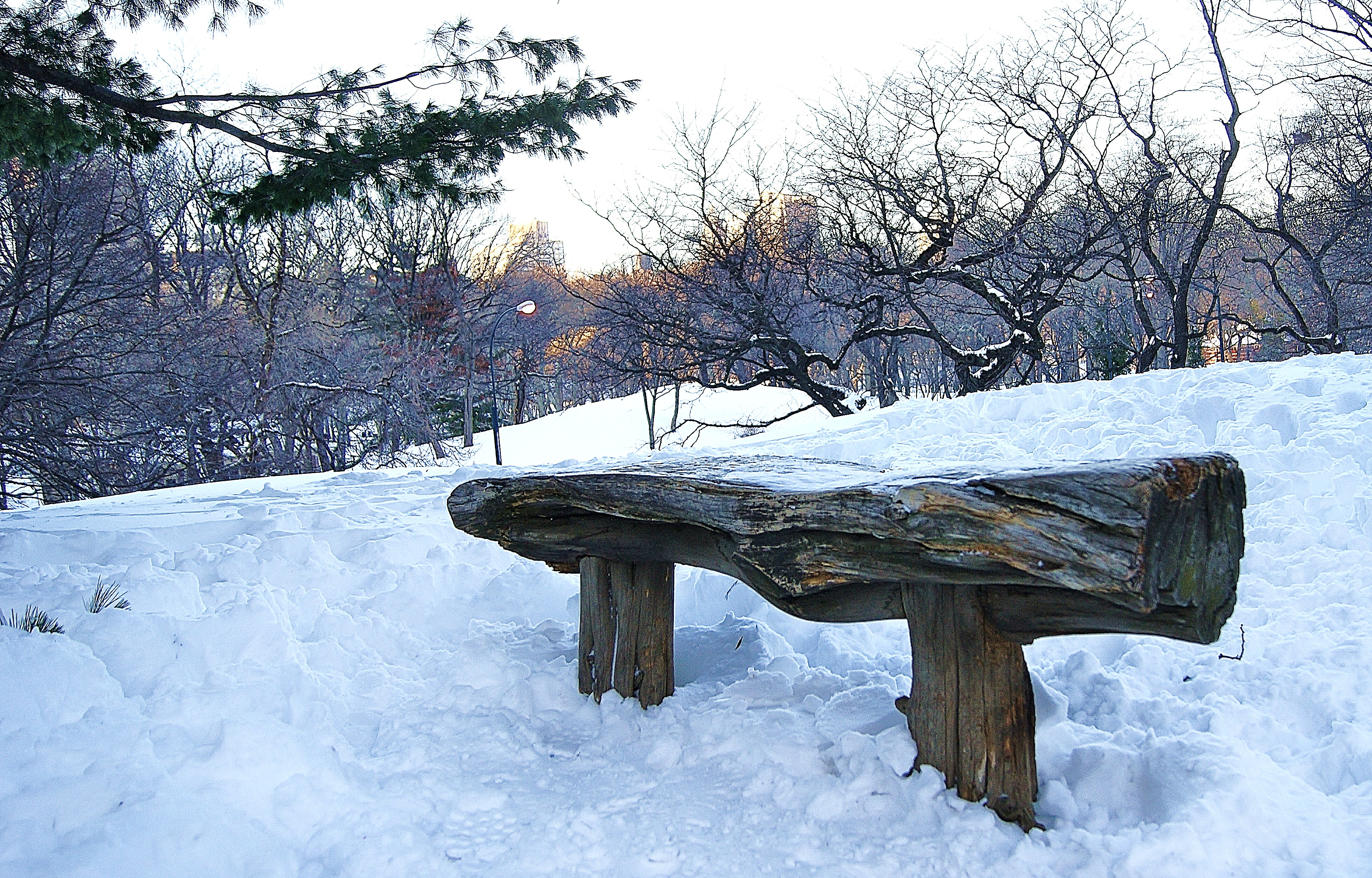
Snow at Central Park, winter 2011

New York City averages 49.9 in (1,267 mm) annually. Spring is the wettest season and February is the driest month. Every single month in the city's recorded history has reported some rainfall, showing the variability of the climate. On occasion, tropical systems can drop heavy rainfall. The record for days without rain, is 36 consecutive days, between October 10 and November 13, 1924. The most rainfall in 24 hours was 8.28 in (210.3 mm) on September 23, 1882.

Annually, most snow in New York City occurs from December through late March. Snowfall averages 29.8 in (75.7 cm) per year but is highly variable between winter seasons. The most snowfall was 27.3 in (69 cm) on January 23, 2016.

=== Averages ===
Climate data for New York (Belvedere Castle, Central Park), 1991–2020 normals
Month	Jan	Feb	Mar	Apr	May	Jun	Jul	Aug	Sep	Oct	Nov	Dec	Year
Average precipitation inches (mm)	3.64 (92)	3.19 (81)	4.29 (109)	4.09 (104)	3.96 (101)	4.54 (115)	4.60 (117)	4.56 (116)	4.31 (109)	4.38 (111)	3.58 (91)	4.38 (111)	49.52 (1,258)
Average snowfall inches (cm)	8.8 (22)	10.1 (26)	5.0 (13)	0.4 (1.0)	0.0 (0.0)	0.0 (0.0)	0.0 (0.0)	0.0 (0.0)	0.0 (0.0)	0.1 (0.25)	0.5 (1.3)	4.9 (12)	29.8 (76)
Average precipitation days (≥ 0.01 in)	10.8	10.0	11.1	11.4	11.5	11.2	10.5	10.0	8.8	9.5	9.2	11.4	125.4
Average snowy days (≥ 0.1 in)	3.7	3.2	2.0	0.2	0.0	0.0	0.0	0.0	0.0	0.0	0.2	2.1	11.4
Source: NOAA

=== Rainfall Extremes ===
==== Lowest ====
Period	Record rainfall	Year
Year	26.09 inches (663 mm)	1965
Spring (March–May)	4.95 inches (126 mm)	1885
Summer (June–August)	4.31 inches (109 mm)	1966
Autumn (September–November)	4.00 inches (102 mm)	1908
Winter (December–February)	4.22 inches (107 mm)	1901–1902
January	0.58 inches (15 mm)	1981
February	0.46 inches (12 mm)	1895
March	0.80 inches (20 mm)	2006
April	0.95 inches (24 mm)	1891
May	0.30 inches (7.6 mm)	1903
June	0.02 inches (0.51 mm)	1949
July	0.44 inches (11 mm)	1999
August	0.18 inches (4.6 mm)	1995
September	0.21 inches (5.3 mm)	1884
October	0.01 inches (0.25 mm)	2024
November	0.34 inches (8.6 mm)	1976
December	0.25 inches (6.4 mm)	1955

==== Highest ====
Period	Record rainfall	Year
Year	80.56 inches (2,046 mm)	1983 (Note: Due to a rain gauge malfunction, the rainfall measurement is in doubt.)
Spring (March–May)	29.15 inches (740 mm)	1983
Summer (June–August)	25.53 inches (648 mm)	2011
Autumn (September–November)	22.31 inches (567 mm)	1913
Winter (December–February)	20.71 inches (526 mm)	1978–1979
January	10.52 inches (267 mm)	1979
February	6.87 inches (174 mm)	1869
March	10.69 inches (272 mm)	2010
April	14.01 inches (356 mm)	1983
May	10.24 inches (260 mm)	1989
June	10.26 inches (261 mm)	2003
July	11.89 inches (302 mm)	1889
August	18.95 inches (481 mm)	2011
September	16.85 inches (428 mm)	1882
October	16.73 inches (425 mm)	2005
November	12.41 inches (315 mm)	1972
December	9.98 inches (253 mm)	1973

=== Snowfall ===
==== Lowest ====
Period	Record least snowfall	Year
Year	2.3 in (5.8 cm)	2023
Seasonal (July–June)	2.3 in (5.8 cm)	2022–2023
Winter (December–February)	0.5 in (1.3 cm)	1997–1998
January	0.0 in (0 cm)	1890
February	0.0 in (0 cm)	1998
March	0.0 in (0 cm)	2025, 2012, 1903, 1894, 1878
April–November	0 in (0 cm)	many
December	0.0 in (0 cm)	2011, 2006, 1891, 1882, 1877, 1870

==== Highest ====
Period	Record most snowfall	Year
Year	64.0 in (163 cm)	1896
Seasonal (July–June)	75.6 in (192 cm)	1995–1996
Spring (March–May)	33.5 in (85 cm)	1896
Autumn (September–November)	19.0 in (48 cm)	1898
Winter (December–February)	60.9 in (155 cm)	2010–2011
January	36.0 in (91 cm)	2011
February	36.9 in (94 cm)	2010
March	30.5 in (77 cm)	1896
April	13.5 in (34 cm)	1875
May	Trace	2020, 1977, 1956, 1946
June–September	0 in (0 cm)	–
October	2.9 in (7.4 cm)	2011
November	19.0 in (48 cm)	1898
December	30.2 in (77 cm)	1947

== Other phenomena ==
=== Sunshine, UV and daylight ===
The city generally experiences sunny conditions. As a result of New York City's latitude, 40°42′46″N 74°00′22″W, it is not subject to the extremes of daylight that places much farther north see. However, it is far north enough for there to be a moderate change of possible daylight hours throughout the year.

Climate data for New York (Belvedere Castle, Central Park)
Month	Jan	Feb	Mar	Apr	May	Jun	Jul	Aug	Sep	Oct	Nov	Dec	Year
Mean monthly sunshine hours	162.7	163.1	212.5	225.6	256.6	257.3	268.2	268.2	219.3	211.2	151.0	139.0	2,534.7
Mean daily daylight hours	9.7	10.7	12.0	13.3	14.5	15.1	14.7	13.7	12.4	11.1	9.9	9.3	12.2
Percentage possible sunshine	54	55	57	57	57	57	59	63	59	61	48	48	57
Average ultraviolet index	2	3	4	6	7	8	8	8	6	4	2	1	5
Source 1: NOAA (relative humidity and sun 1961–1990)
Source 2: Weather Atlas

=== Wind ===
New York City can occasionally experience strong winds, like many coastal locations. Tropical cyclones or intense oceanic storms bring the strongest winds. The strongest gust in Central Park, of 78 miles per hour (126 km/h), occurred on December 2, 1974, however, a station at The Battery reported a gust of 113 miles per hour (182 km/h) on October 14, 1954, during Hurricane Hazel. Most recently Hurricane Sandy, with 185 kilometres per hour (115 mph) struck the city on October 29, 2012, causing billions of dollars in damage. It resulted in loss of power, severe flooding and many residents being displaced.

== Climate change ==
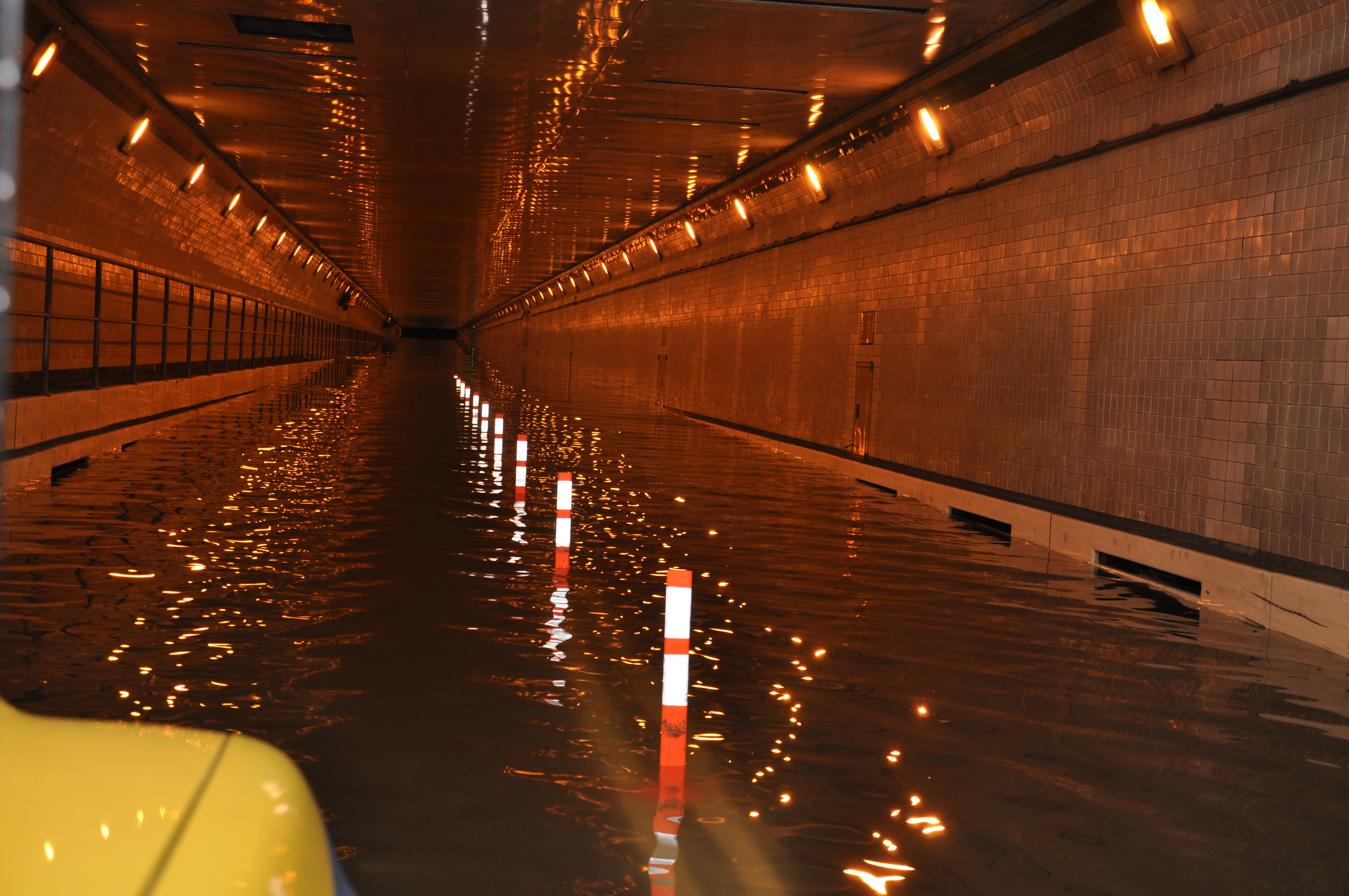
Queens–Midtown Tunnel after flooding caused by Hurricane Sandy on October 29, 2012. Climate change means events like this will become more likely.

Being a coastal city, New York City is expected to experience significant effects from rising sea levels. Predictions that the sea level will rise by as much as 6 feet (1.8 m) by 2100 prompted then-mayor Bill deBlasio to invest $10 billion into infrastructure in 2019. The city is also expected to become more susceptible to storm surges and flooding, meaning events like Hurricane Sandy's impacts will become more likely in the future.

=== Temperature ===
The temperature in New York City has generally increased steadily over the last 150 years and this trend is expected to continue due to anthropogenic warming. By 2080, it is predicted that the climate of the city will be similar to coastal South Carolina. The mean temperature has risen by 2.4 °F (1.3 °C) since the 1970s and this warming is expected to accelerate in the coming decades.

=== Precipitation ===
Precipitation in the city has significantly increased since 2000; both rainfall and snowfall have risen, but snowfall has increased much more significantly. However, it is argued that such trends, being so recent, make it impossible to predict whether such increases will continue or become steadier.

== Station data ==
Climate data for New York (Belvedere Castle, Central Park), 1991–2020 normals, (Note: Mean monthly maxima and minima (i.e. the expected highest and lowest temperature readings at any point during the year or given month) calculated based on data at said location from 1991 to 2020.) extremes 1869–present (Note: Official weather observations for Central Park were conducted at the Arsenal at Fifth Avenue and 64th Street from 1869 to 1919, and at Belvedere Castle since 1919.)
Month	Jan	Feb	Mar	Apr	May	Jun	Jul	Aug	Sep	Oct	Nov	Dec	Year
Record high °F (°C)	72 (22)	78 (26)	86 (30)	96 (36)	99 (37)	101 (38)	106 (41)	104 (40)	102 (39)	94 (34)	84 (29)	75 (24)	106 (41)
Mean maximum °F (°C)	60.4 (15.8)	60.7 (15.9)	70.3 (21.3)	82.9 (28.3)	88.5 (31.4)	92.1 (33.4)	95.7 (35.4)	93.4 (34.1)	89.0 (31.7)	79.7 (26.5)	70.7 (21.5)	62.9 (17.2)	97.0 (36.1)
Mean daily maximum °F (°C)	39.5 (4.2)	42.2 (5.7)	49.9 (9.9)	61.8 (16.6)	71.4 (21.9)	79.7 (26.5)	84.9 (29.4)	83.3 (28.5)	76.2 (24.6)	64.5 (18.1)	54.0 (12.2)	44.3 (6.8)	62.6 (17.0)
Daily mean °F (°C)	33.7 (0.9)	35.9 (2.2)	42.8 (6.0)	53.7 (12.1)	63.2 (17.3)	72.0 (22.2)	77.5 (25.3)	76.1 (24.5)	69.2 (20.7)	57.9 (14.4)	48.0 (8.9)	39.1 (3.9)	55.8 (13.2)
Mean daily minimum °F (°C)	27.9 (−2.3)	29.5 (−1.4)	35.8 (2.1)	45.5 (7.5)	55.0 (12.8)	64.4 (18.0)	70.1 (21.2)	68.9 (20.5)	62.3 (16.8)	51.4 (10.8)	42.0 (5.6)	33.8 (1.0)	48.9 (9.4)
Mean minimum °F (°C)	9.8 (−12.3)	12.7 (−10.7)	19.7 (−6.8)	32.8 (0.4)	43.9 (6.6)	52.7 (11.5)	61.8 (16.6)	60.3 (15.7)	50.2 (10.1)	38.4 (3.6)	27.7 (−2.4)	18.0 (−7.8)	7.7 (−13.5)
Record low °F (°C)	−6 (−21)	−15 (−26)	3 (−16)	12 (−11)	32 (0)	44 (7)	52 (11)	50 (10)	39 (4)	28 (−2)	5 (−15)	−13 (−25)	−15 (−26)
Average precipitation inches (mm)	3.64 (92)	3.19 (81)	4.29 (109)	4.09 (104)	3.96 (101)	4.54 (115)	4.60 (117)	4.56 (116)	4.31 (109)	4.38 (111)	3.58 (91)	4.38 (111)	49.52 (1,258)
Average snowfall inches (cm)	8.8 (22)	10.1 (26)	5.0 (13)	0.4 (1.0)	0.0 (0.0)	0.0 (0.0)	0.0 (0.0)	0.0 (0.0)	0.0 (0.0)	0.1 (0.25)	0.5 (1.3)	4.9 (12)	29.8 (76)
Average extreme snow depth inches (cm)	5.8 (15)	7.9 (20)	4.4 (11)	0.4 (1.0)	0.0 (0.0)	0.0 (0.0)	0.0 (0.0)	0.0 (0.0)	0.0 (0.0)	0.0 (0.0)	0.4 (1.0)	3.7 (9.4)	12.3 (31)
Average precipitation days (≥ 0.01 in)	10.8	10.0	11.1	11.4	11.5	11.2	10.5	10.0	8.8	9.5	9.2	11.4	125.4
Average snowy days (≥ 0.1 in)	3.7	3.2	2.0	0.2	0.0	0.0	0.0	0.0	0.0	0.0	0.2	2.1	11.4
Average relative humidity (%)	61.5	60.2	58.5	55.3	62.7	65.2	64.2	66.0	67.8	65.6	64.6	64.1	63.0
Average dew point °F (°C)	18.0 (−7.8)	19.0 (−7.2)	25.9 (−3.4)	34.0 (1.1)	47.3 (8.5)	57.4 (14.1)	61.9 (16.6)	62.1 (16.7)	55.6 (13.1)	44.1 (6.7)	34.0 (1.1)	24.6 (−4.1)	40.3 (4.6)
Mean monthly sunshine hours	162.7	163.1	212.5	225.6	256.6	257.3	268.2	268.2	219.3	211.2	151.0	139.0	2,534.7
Percentage possible sunshine	54	55	57	57	57	57	59	63	59	61	51	48	57
Average ultraviolet index	2	3	4	6	7	8	8	8	6	4	2	1	5
Source 1: NOAA (relative humidity and sun 1961–1990; dew point 1965–1984)
Source 2: Weather Atlas.

Sea temperature data for New York
Month	Jan	Feb	Mar	Apr	May	Jun	Jul	Aug	Sep	Oct	Nov	Dec	Year
Average sea temperature °F (°C)	41.7 (5.4)	39.7 (4.3)	40.2 (4.5)	45.1 (7.3)	52.5 (11.4)	64.5 (18.1)	72.1 (22.3)	74.1 (23.4)	70.1 (21.2)	63.0 (17.2)	54.3 (12.4)	47.2 (8.4)	55.4 (13.0)

Climate data for New York LaGuardia Airport, NY (1991-2020 normals, extremes 1939-present)
Month	Jan	Feb	Mar	Apr	May	Jun	Jul	Aug	Sep	Oct	Nov	Dec	Year
Record high °F (°C)	72 (22)	79 (26)	86 (30)	94 (34)	97 (36)	101 (38)	107 (42)	104 (40)	102 (39)	95 (35)	83 (28)	75 (24)	107 (42)
Mean maximum °F (°C)	60.2 (15.7)	60.0 (15.6)	69.3 (20.7)	81.7 (27.6)	89.3 (31.8)	94.1 (34.5)	97.4 (36.3)	94.7 (34.8)	89.6 (32.0)	81.2 (27.3)	70.9 (21.6)	62.8 (17.1)	98.7 (37.1)
Mean daily maximum °F (°C)	40.2 (4.6)	42.7 (5.9)	49.9 (9.9)	61.3 (16.3)	71.8 (22.1)	81.1 (27.3)	86.4 (30.2)	84.5 (29.2)	77.2 (25.1)	66.0 (18.9)	55.0 (12.8)	45.4 (7.4)	63.5 (17.5)
Daily mean °F (°C)	34.4 (1.3)	36.3 (2.4)	43.1 (6.2)	53.6 (12.0)	63.7 (17.6)	73.4 (23.0)	79.2 (26.2)	77.7 (25.4)	70.8 (21.6)	59.6 (15.3)	49.1 (9.5)	40.0 (4.4)	56.8 (13.8)
Mean daily minimum °F (°C)	28.6 (−1.9)	29.9 (−1.2)	36.2 (2.3)	46.0 (7.8)	55.7 (13.2)	65.7 (18.7)	71.9 (22.2)	71.0 (21.7)	64.4 (18.0)	53.3 (11.8)	43.2 (6.2)	34.7 (1.5)	50.1 (10.1)
Mean minimum °F (°C)	11.1 (−11.6)	13.6 (−10.2)	21.0 (−6.1)	34.2 (1.2)	45.6 (7.6)	54.3 (12.4)	63.5 (17.5)	62.4 (16.9)	52.9 (11.6)	40.7 (4.8)	29.4 (−1.4)	19.4 (−7.0)	8.7 (−12.9)
Record low °F (°C)	−3 (−19)	−7 (−22)	7 (−14)	22 (−6)	36 (2)	46 (8)	56 (13)	51 (11)	42 (6)	30 (−1)	17 (−8)	−2 (−19)	−7 (−22)
Average precipitation inches (mm)	3.25 (83)	2.93 (74)	4.01 (102)	3.85 (98)	3.58 (91)	4.03 (102)	4.30 (109)	4.41 (112)	3.88 (99)	3.81 (97)	3.15 (80)	4.08 (104)	45.28 (1,150)
Average snowfall inches (cm)	8.6 (22)	9.8 (25)	5.4 (14)	0.4 (1.0)	0.0 (0.0)	0.0 (0.0)	0.0 (0.0)	0.0 (0.0)	0.0 (0.0)	0.1 (0.25)	0.3 (0.76)	5.2 (13)	29.8 (76)
Average precipitation days (≥ 0.01 in)	10.3	10.2	10.9	11.2	11.6	10.7	9.7	9.5	8.3	9.0	8.8	11.5	121.7
Average snowy days (≥ 0.1 in)	4.4	3.7	2.6	0.2	0.0	0.0	0.0	0.0	0.0	0.0	0.2	2.7	13.8
Source: NOAA

Climate data for JFK Airport, New York (1991–2020 normals, (Note: Mean monthly maxima and minima (i.e. the expected highest and lowest temperature readings at any point during the year or given month) calculated based on data at said location from 1991 to 2020.) extremes 1948–present)
Month	Jan	Feb	Mar	Apr	May	Jun	Jul	Aug	Sep	Oct	Nov	Dec	Year
Record high °F (°C)	71 (22)	71 (22)	85 (29)	90 (32)	99 (37)	102 (39)	104 (40)	101 (38)	98 (37)	95 (35)	82 (28)	75 (24)	104 (40)
Mean maximum °F (°C)	57.7 (14.3)	58.3 (14.6)	67.5 (19.7)	77.9 (25.5)	85.6 (29.8)	92.4 (33.6)	95.2 (35.1)	91.9 (33.3)	87.9 (31.1)	79.7 (26.5)	68.9 (20.5)	60.6 (15.9)	96.8 (36.0)
Mean daily maximum °F (°C)	39.5 (4.2)	41.7 (5.4)	48.7 (9.3)	58.8 (14.9)	68.4 (20.2)	78.0 (25.6)	83.6 (28.7)	82.2 (27.9)	75.8 (24.3)	64.7 (18.2)	53.8 (12.1)	44.5 (6.9)	61.6 (16.4)
Daily mean °F (°C)	32.8 (0.4)	34.5 (1.4)	41.1 (5.1)	50.9 (10.5)	60.5 (15.8)	70.2 (21.2)	76.1 (24.5)	75.0 (23.9)	68.4 (20.2)	57.2 (14.0)	46.8 (8.2)	38.3 (3.5)	54.3 (12.4)
Mean daily minimum °F (°C)	26.2 (−3.2)	27.4 (−2.6)	33.6 (0.9)	42.9 (6.1)	52.5 (11.4)	62.4 (16.9)	68.7 (20.4)	67.8 (19.9)	61.0 (16.1)	49.8 (9.9)	39.8 (4.3)	32.0 (0.0)	47.0 (8.3)
Mean minimum °F (°C)	10.2 (−12.1)	13.3 (−10.4)	20.2 (−6.6)	32.6 (0.3)	42.9 (6.1)	52.6 (11.4)	62.8 (17.1)	60.1 (15.6)	50.0 (10.0)	37.9 (3.3)	26.9 (−2.8)	18.6 (−7.4)	8.2 (−13.2)
Record low °F (°C)	−2 (−19)	−2 (−19)	7 (−14)	20 (−7)	34 (1)	45 (7)	55 (13)	46 (8)	40 (4)	30 (−1)	15 (−9)	2 (−17)	−2 (−19)
Average precipitation inches (mm)	3.23 (82)	2.76 (70)	3.94 (100)	3.55 (90)	3.66 (93)	3.85 (98)	3.86 (98)	4.11 (104)	3.58 (91)	3.72 (94)	3.07 (78)	3.96 (101)	43.29 (1,100)
Average snowfall inches (cm)	7.5 (19)	8.6 (22)	4.3 (11)	0.6 (1.5)	0.0 (0.0)	0.0 (0.0)	0.0 (0.0)	0.0 (0.0)	0.0 (0.0)	0.0 (0.0)	0.4 (1.0)	4.5 (11)	25.9 (66)
Average precipitation days (≥ 0.01 inch)	10.7	9.8	10.8	11.4	11.8	10.6	9.4	9.0	8.2	9.4	8.9	11.2	121.2
Average snowy days (≥ 0.1 in)	4.6	3.8	2.5	0.3	0.0	0.0	0.0	0.0	0.0	0.0	0.2	2.6	14.0
Average relative humidity (%)	64.9	64.4	63.4	64.1	69.5	71.5	71.4	71.7	71.9	69.1	67.9	66.3	68.0
Source: NOAA (relative humidity 1961–1990)

Climate data for New York LaGuardia Airport, NY (1991-2020 normals, extremes 1939-present)
Month	Jan	Feb	Mar	Apr	May	Jun	Jul	Aug	Sep	Oct	Nov	Dec	Year
Record high °F (°C)	72 (22)	79 (26)	86 (30)	94 (34)	97 (36)	101 (38)	107 (42)	104 (40)	102 (39)	95 (35)	83 (28)	75 (24)	107 (42)
Mean maximum °F (°C)	60.2 (15.7)	60.0 (15.6)	69.3 (20.7)	81.7 (27.6)	89.3 (31.8)	94.1 (34.5)	97.4 (36.3)	94.7 (34.8)	89.6 (32.0)	81.2 (27.3)	70.9 (21.6)	62.8 (17.1)	98.7 (37.1)
Mean daily maximum °F (°C)	40.2 (4.6)	42.7 (5.9)	49.9 (9.9)	61.3 (16.3)	71.8 (22.1)	81.1 (27.3)	86.4 (30.2)	84.5 (29.2)	77.2 (25.1)	66.0 (18.9)	55.0 (12.8)	45.4 (7.4)	63.5 (17.5)
Daily mean °F (°C)	34.4 (1.3)	36.3 (2.4)	43.1 (6.2)	53.6 (12.0)	63.7 (17.6)	73.4 (23.0)	79.2 (26.2)	77.7 (25.4)	70.8 (21.6)	59.6 (15.3)	49.1 (9.5)	40.0 (4.4)	56.8 (13.8)
Mean daily minimum °F (°C)	28.6 (−1.9)	29.9 (−1.2)	36.2 (2.3)	46.0 (7.8)	55.7 (13.2)	65.7 (18.7)	71.9 (22.2)	71.0 (21.7)	64.4 (18.0)	53.3 (11.8)	43.2 (6.2)	34.7 (1.5)	50.1 (10.1)
Mean minimum °F (°C)	11.1 (−11.6)	13.6 (−10.2)	21.0 (−6.1)	34.2 (1.2)	45.6 (7.6)	54.3 (12.4)	63.5 (17.5)	62.4 (16.9)	52.9 (11.6)	40.7 (4.8)	29.4 (−1.4)	19.4 (−7.0)	8.7 (−12.9)
Record low °F (°C)	−3 (−19)	−7 (−22)	7 (−14)	22 (−6)	36 (2)	46 (8)	56 (13)	51 (11)	42 (6)	30 (−1)	17 (−8)	−2 (−19)	−7 (−22)
Average precipitation inches (mm)	3.25 (83)	2.93 (74)	4.01 (102)	3.85 (98)	3.58 (91)	4.03 (102)	4.30 (109)	4.41 (112)	3.88 (99)	3.81 (97)	3.15 (80)	4.08 (104)	45.28 (1,150)
Average snowfall inches (cm)	8.6 (22)	9.8 (25)	5.4 (14)	0.4 (1.0)	0.0 (0.0)	0.0 (0.0)	0.0 (0.0)	0.0 (0.0)	0.0 (0.0)	0.1 (0.25)	0.3 (0.76)	5.2 (13)	29.8 (76)
Average precipitation days (≥ 0.01 in)	10.3	10.2	10.9	11.2	11.6	10.7	9.7	9.5	8.3	9.0	8.8	11.5	121.7
Average snowy days (≥ 0.1 in)	4.4	3.7	2.6	0.2	0.0	0.0	0.0	0.0	0.0	0.0	0.2	2.7	13.8
Source: NOAA

Climate data for Newark, New Jersey (Newark Liberty Int'l), 1991–2020 normals, extremes 1843–present
Month	Jan	Feb	Mar	Apr	May	Jun	Jul	Aug	Sep	Oct	Nov	Dec	Year
Record high °F (°C)	74 (23)	80 (27)	89 (32)	97 (36)	99 (37)	103 (39)	108 (42)	105 (41)	105 (41)	96 (36)	85 (29)	76 (24)	108 (42)
Mean maximum °F (°C)	61.8 (16.6)	62.5 (16.9)	72.3 (22.4)	84.4 (29.1)	91.4 (33.0)	95.9 (35.5)	98.7 (37.1)	95.9 (35.5)	91.5 (33.1)	82.4 (28.0)	72.2 (22.3)	63.8 (17.7)	100.0 (37.8)
Mean daily maximum °F (°C)	40.0 (4.4)	43.0 (6.1)	50.9 (10.5)	62.6 (17.0)	72.6 (22.6)	81.8 (27.7)	86.9 (30.5)	84.7 (29.3)	77.7 (25.4)	66.0 (18.9)	54.9 (12.7)	44.8 (7.1)	63.8 (17.7)
Daily mean °F (°C)	32.8 (0.4)	35.1 (1.7)	42.5 (5.8)	53.3 (11.8)	63.3 (17.4)	72.7 (22.6)	78.2 (25.7)	76.4 (24.7)	69.2 (20.7)	57.5 (14.2)	47.0 (8.3)	38.0 (3.3)	55.5 (13.1)
Mean daily minimum °F (°C)	25.5 (−3.6)	27.2 (−2.7)	34.2 (1.2)	44.1 (6.7)	53.9 (12.2)	63.6 (17.6)	69.4 (20.8)	68.0 (20.0)	60.7 (15.9)	49.0 (9.4)	39.0 (3.9)	31.2 (−0.4)	47.1 (8.4)
Mean minimum °F (°C)	9.1 (−12.7)	12.1 (−11.1)	19.4 (−7.0)	32.3 (0.2)	42.5 (5.8)	52.5 (11.4)	61.9 (16.6)	59.2 (15.1)	48.3 (9.1)	36.1 (2.3)	25.9 (−3.4)	17.2 (−8.2)	7.0 (−13.9)
Record low °F (°C)	−13 (−25)	−14 (−26)	2 (−17)	13 (−11)	31 (−1)	38 (3)	46 (8)	45 (7)	34 (1)	22 (−6)	8 (−13)	−13 (−25)	−14 (−26)
Average precipitation inches (mm)	3.42 (87)	2.98 (76)	4.13 (105)	3.87 (98)	3.97 (101)	4.34 (110)	4.66 (118)	4.15 (105)	3.82 (97)	3.79 (96)	3.33 (85)	4.14 (105)	46.60 (1,184)
Average snowfall inches (cm)	9.1 (23)	10.1 (26)	5.6 (14)	0.5 (1.3)	0.0 (0.0)	0.0 (0.0)	0.0 (0.0)	0.0 (0.0)	0.0 (0.0)	0.2 (0.51)	0.6 (1.5)	5.4 (14)	31.5 (80)
Average extreme snow depth inches (cm)	5.6 (14)	6.3 (16)	3.2 (8.1)	0.2 (0.51)	0.0 (0.0)	0.0 (0.0)	0.0 (0.0)	0.0 (0.0)	0.0 (0.0)	0.1 (0.25)	0.4 (1.0)	3.7 (9.4)	10.8 (27)
Average precipitation days (≥ 0.01 in)	10.6	10.0	10.9	11.5	11.4	10.9	10.0	9.8	8.7	9.4	8.8	11.1	123.1
Average snowy days (≥ 0.1 in)	4.6	3.8	2.7	0.3	0.0	0.0	0.0	0.0	0.0	0.0	0.3	2.8	14.5
Average relative humidity (%)	65.4	63.3	59.9	57.5	62.0	63.0	63.4	66.2	67.9	66.3	66.5	66.7	64.0
Average dew point °F (°C)	19.2 (−7.1)	20.5 (−6.4)	27.1 (−2.7)	35.2 (1.8)	47.7 (8.7)	57.0 (13.9)	62.2 (16.8)	62.4 (16.9)	56.1 (13.4)	44.6 (7.0)	35.2 (1.8)	24.8 (−4.0)	41.0 (5.0)
Average ultraviolet index	2	3	4	6	7	8	8	8	6	4	2	1	5
Source 1: NOAA (relative humidity and dew point 1961–1989)
Source 2: Weather Atlas (UV)

Climate data for Newark
Month	Jan	Feb	Mar	Apr	May	Jun	Jul	Aug	Sep	Oct	Nov	Dec	Year
Average sea temperature °F (°C)	41.7 (5.4)	39.7 (4.3)	40.2 (4.5)	45.1 (7.3)	52.5 (11.4)	64.5 (18.1)	72.1 (22.3)	74.1 (23.4)	70.1 (21.2)	63.0 (17.3)	54.3 (12.4)	47.2 (8.4)	55.4 (13.0)
Source: Weather Atlas

Time series plot for Central Park, 1869–present

See or edit raw graph data.

Climate data for Teterboro Airport, New Jersey (1991–2020 normals, extremes 1969–present)
Month	Jan	Feb	Mar	Apr	May	Jun	Jul	Aug	Sep	Oct	Nov	Dec	Year
Record high °F (°C)	73 (23)	80 (27)	85 (29)	95 (35)	98 (37)	101 (38)	104 (40)	102 (39)	99 (37)	95 (35)	84 (29)	77 (25)	104 (40)
Mean maximum °F (°C)	60.9 (16.1)	61.5 (16.4)	70.2 (21.2)	83.4 (28.6)	90.6 (32.6)	94.2 (34.6)	97.3 (36.3)	94.8 (34.9)	91.3 (32.9)	82.5 (28.1)	72.4 (22.4)	63.9 (17.7)	98.4 (36.9)
Mean daily maximum °F (°C)	39.9 (4.4)	42.8 (6.0)	50.6 (10.3)	62.5 (16.9)	73.1 (22.8)	82.0 (27.8)	87.0 (30.6)	85.1 (29.5)	78.4 (25.8)	66.8 (19.3)	55.5 (13.1)	44.9 (7.2)	64.1 (17.8)
Daily mean °F (°C)	32.8 (0.4)	34.9 (1.6)	42.3 (5.7)	53.1 (11.7)	63.2 (17.3)	72.5 (22.5)	78.0 (25.6)	76.2 (24.6)	69.2 (20.7)	57.4 (14.1)	46.9 (8.3)	37.9 (3.3)	55.4 (13.0)
Mean daily minimum °F (°C)	25.7 (−3.5)	27.0 (−2.8)	34.0 (1.1)	43.7 (6.5)	53.3 (11.8)	63.1 (17.3)	68.9 (20.5)	67.3 (19.6)	59.9 (15.5)	47.9 (8.8)	38.3 (3.5)	30.8 (−0.7)	46.7 (8.1)
Mean minimum °F (°C)	8.0 (−13.3)	10.9 (−11.7)	19.0 (−7.2)	30.3 (−0.9)	39.6 (4.2)	49.9 (9.9)	58.7 (14.8)	55.9 (13.3)	45.7 (7.6)	33.2 (0.7)	23.9 (−4.5)	16.3 (−8.7)	5.8 (−14.6)
Record low °F (°C)	−7 (−22)	−2 (−19)	8 (−13)	19 (−7)	32 (0)	42 (6)	49 (9)	43 (6)	38 (3)	24 (−4)	14 (−10)	−3 (−19)	−7 (−22)
Average precipitation inches (mm)	3.28 (83)	2.82 (72)	4.09 (104)	3.97 (101)	3.94 (100)	4.25 (108)	4.45 (113)	4.25 (108)	4.11 (104)	3.73 (95)	3.30 (84)	4.10 (104)	46.29 (1,176)
Average precipitation days (≥ 0.01 in)	10.7	10.1	11.2	11.4	12.1	11.0	9.7	10.4	8.7	10.5	9.1	11.6	126.5
Source 1: NOAA
Source 2: National Weather Service
