= Climate of Sochi =

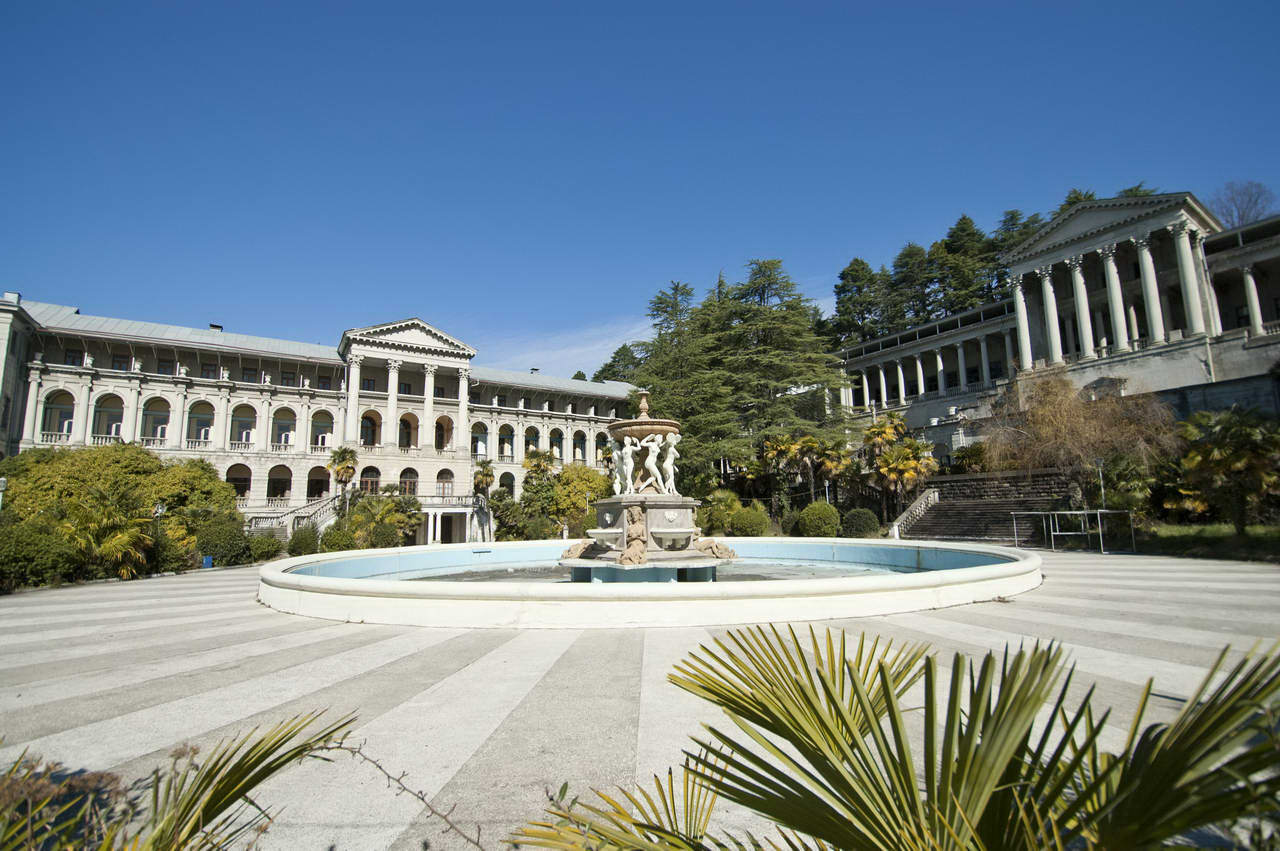
Sochi

Sochi, is a city in Krasnodar Krai, Russia, located on the eastern Black Sea coastline. Sochi has a humid subtropical climate (Köppen climate classification Cfa), with cool to mild winters and hot summers. Sochi is humid throughout the entire year, most especially during winters, which are very damp. Summers are also humid but sunny as well, although no month has less than 10 rainy days. Sochi is very warm for Russian standards.

== Temperature ==
Its average annual temperature is 14.6 °C (58.3 °F), 18.4 °C (65.1 °F) during the day and 11.1 °C (52.0 °F) at night. In the coldest month – January, the temperature typically ranges from 5 to 15 °C (41 to 59 °F) during the day and −2 to 6 °C (28 to 43 °F) at night. In the warmest month – August, the typical temperature ranges from 26 to 32 °C (79 to 90 °F) during the day and about 21 °C (70 °F) at night. Large fluctuations in temperature are rare. The hottest temperature recorded in Sochi was 39.4 °C (102.9 °F) on July 30, 2000. The lowest temperature was −13.4 °C (7.9 °F) on January 25, 1892 and the lowest since 2001 was −7.3 °C (18.9 °F) on January 4, 2016.

=== Seasonal climate ===
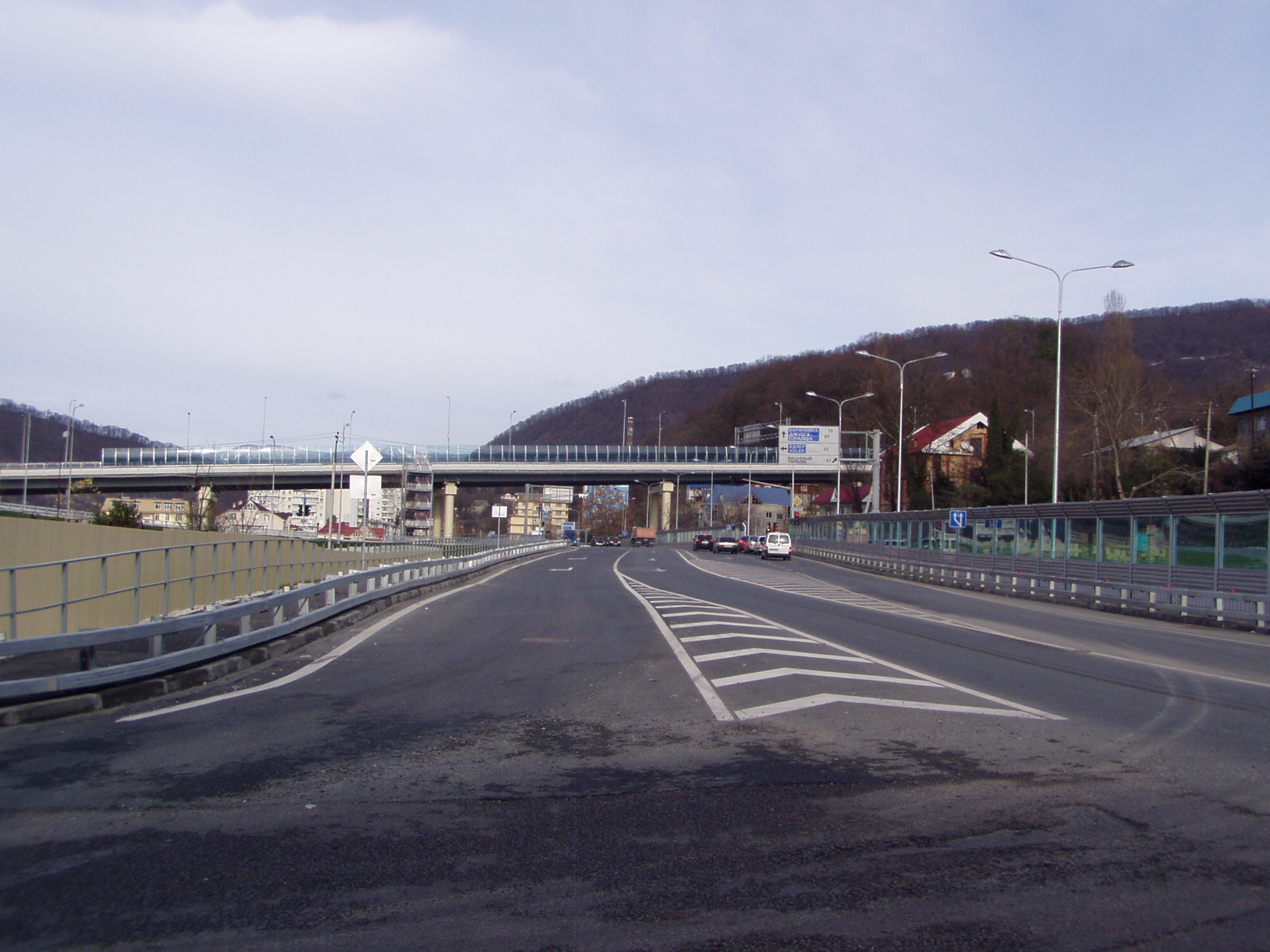
Winter in Sochi

==== Winter ====
Winters in Sochi are cool to mild. January and February are the coldest months, with average temperatures around 10 °C (50 °F) during the day and 3 °C (37 °F) at night. Snow and frosts are not uncommon from December to March.

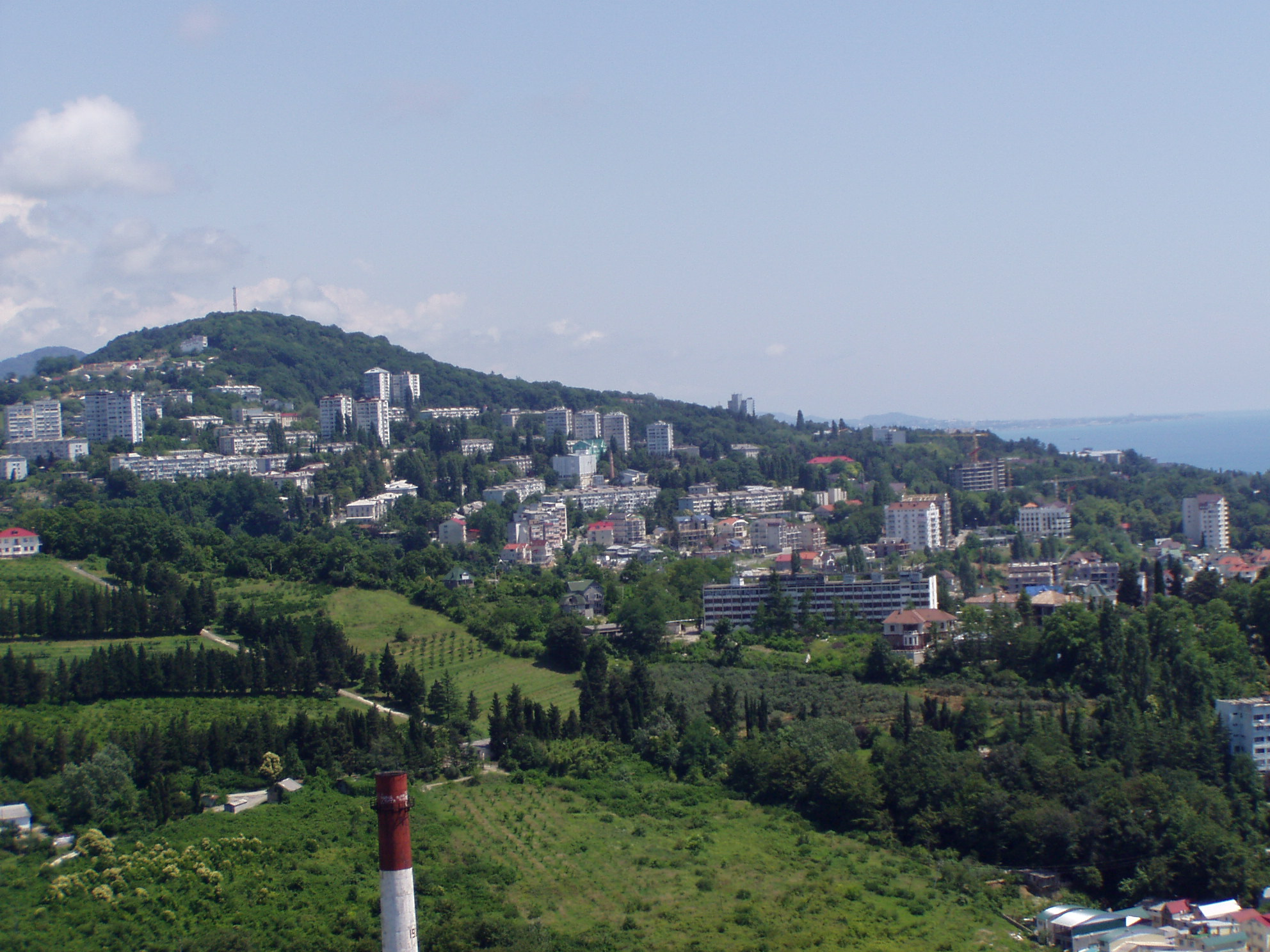
Summer in Sochi

==== Summer ====
Generally the summer season lasts about six months, from May to October. July and August are the warmest months, with average temperatures around 27–29 °C (81–84 °F) during the day and 27–21 °C (81–70 °F) at night. In June and September the average temperature is around 25 °C (77 °F) during the day and 16 °C (61 °F) at night, and in May and October the average temperature is around 20 °C (68 °F) during the day and 12 °C (54 °F) at night.

== Climate data tables ==
=== Climate of micro-districts of Sochi ===
Climate data for Sochi (1991–2020 normals, extremes 1870–present)
Month	Jan	Feb	Mar	Apr	May	Jun	Jul	Aug	Sep	Oct	Nov	Dec	Year
Record high °C (°F)	22.4 (72.3)	23.5 (74.3)	30.0 (86.0)	33.7 (92.7)	34.7 (94.5)	35.2 (95.4)	39.4 (102.9)	38.5 (101.3)	36.0 (96.8)	32.1 (89.8)	29.1 (84.4)	23.5 (74.3)	39.4 (102.9)
Mean daily maximum °C (°F)	9.9 (49.8)	10.4 (50.7)	12.7 (54.9)	17.0 (62.6)	21.2 (70.2)	25.4 (77.7)	27.9 (82.2)	28.6 (83.5)	25.2 (77.4)	20.7 (69.3)	15.6 (60.1)	12.0 (53.6)	18.9 (66.0)
Daily mean °C (°F)	6.3 (43.3)	6.5 (43.7)	8.6 (47.5)	12.3 (54.1)	16.6 (61.9)	20.9 (69.6)	23.7 (74.7)	24.3 (75.7)	20.5 (68.9)	16.2 (61.2)	11.4 (52.5)	8.3 (46.9)	14.6 (58.3)
Mean daily minimum °C (°F)	3.8 (38.8)	3.7 (38.7)	5.6 (42.1)	9.0 (48.2)	13.3 (55.9)	17.4 (63.3)	20.0 (68.0)	20.7 (69.3)	16.9 (62.4)	13.1 (55.6)	8.5 (47.3)	5.7 (42.3)	11.5 (52.7)
Record low °C (°F)	−13.4 (7.9)	−12.6 (9.3)	−7.0 (19.4)	−5.0 (23.0)	3.0 (37.4)	7.1 (44.8)	12.6 (54.7)	10.4 (50.7)	2.7 (36.9)	−3.2 (26.2)	−5.4 (22.3)	−8.3 (17.1)	−13.4 (7.9)
Average precipitation mm (inches)	177 (7.0)	134 (5.3)	133 (5.2)	109 (4.3)	107 (4.2)	95 (3.7)	120 (4.7)	106 (4.2)	140 (5.5)	177 (7.0)	175 (6.9)	178 (7.0)	1,651 (65.0)
Average extreme snow depth cm (inches)	1 (0.4)	1 (0.4)	0 (0)	0 (0)	0 (0)	0 (0)	0 (0)	0 (0)	0 (0)	0 (0)	0 (0)	0 (0)	1 (0.4)
Average rainy days	19	18	18	18	16	14	11	10	13	15	17	20	189
Average snowy days	6	6	3	0.3	0	0	0	0	0	0	1	4	20
Average relative humidity (%)	73	72	72	75	79	79	79	78	76	76	74	72	75
Mean monthly sunshine hours	96	105	145	161	221	258	279	281	226	195	121	86	2,174
Source 1: Pogoda.ru.net
Source 2: NOAA (sun, 1961–1990)

Climate data for Krasnaya Polyana (1991–2020, extremes 1936–present)
Month	Jan	Feb	Mar	Apr	May	Jun	Jul	Aug	Sep	Oct	Nov	Dec	Year
Record high °C (°F)	18.1 (64.6)	22.4 (72.3)	27.8 (82.0)	35.6 (96.1)	33.4 (92.1)	35.7 (96.3)	38.5 (101.3)	35.9 (96.6)	35.1 (95.2)	30.8 (87.4)	27.7 (81.9)	21.4 (70.5)	38.5 (101.3)
Mean daily maximum °C (°F)	5.5 (41.9)	7.3 (45.1)	10.9 (51.6)	16.7 (62.1)	21.0 (69.8)	24.5 (76.1)	27.1 (80.8)	27.6 (81.7)	23.4 (74.1)	18.4 (65.1)	12.6 (54.7)	7.2 (45.0)	16.8 (62.3)
Daily mean °C (°F)	1.2 (34.2)	2.1 (35.8)	5.1 (41.2)	10.1 (50.2)	14.6 (58.3)	18.3 (64.9)	20.9 (69.6)	21.0 (69.8)	16.8 (62.2)	12.1 (53.8)	6.6 (43.9)	2.8 (37.0)	11.0 (51.7)
Mean daily minimum °C (°F)	−1.3 (29.7)	−1.1 (30.0)	1.5 (34.7)	5.5 (41.9)	9.8 (49.6)	13.4 (56.1)	15.8 (60.4)	15.8 (60.4)	12.0 (53.6)	7.8 (46.0)	3.1 (37.6)	0.2 (32.4)	6.9 (44.4)
Record low °C (°F)	−22.5 (−8.5)	−18.1 (−0.6)	−15.6 (3.9)	−10.6 (12.9)	−0.4 (31.3)	2.6 (36.7)	7.7 (45.9)	5.2 (41.4)	−1.0 (30.2)	−6.1 (21.0)	−13.2 (8.2)	−15.3 (4.5)	−22.5 (−8.5)
Average precipitation mm (inches)	200 (7.9)	170 (6.7)	182 (7.2)	141 (5.6)	145 (5.7)	119 (4.7)	103 (4.1)	99 (3.9)	144 (5.7)	206 (8.1)	205 (8.1)	216 (8.5)	1,930 (76.2)
Source: Pogoda.ru.net

=== Black Sea temperatures ===
Mean sea temperature (1977–2006).
Jan	Feb	Mar	Apr	May	Jun	Jul	Aug	Sep	Oct	Nov	Dec	Year
9.6 °C (49.3 °F)	8.7 °C (47.7 °F)	9.6 °C (49.3 °F)	11.2 °C (52.2 °F)	15.2 °C (59.4 °F)	19.6 °C (67.3 °F)	24.0 °C (75.2 °F)	25.3 °C (77.5 °F)	23.1 °C (73.6 °F)	19.5 °C (67.1 °F)	14.9 °C (58.8 °F)	11.5 °C (52.7 °F)	16.0 °C (60.8 °F)

== See also ==
- Climate of Russia
- Climate of Moscow
