= List of equestrian statues in the United States =

This is a list of equestrian statues in the United States.

== List ==
=== Alaska ===
- Girdwood
  - Mountain Man, by Frederic Remington, Alyeska Resort cast 1907(?)

=== Arizona ===
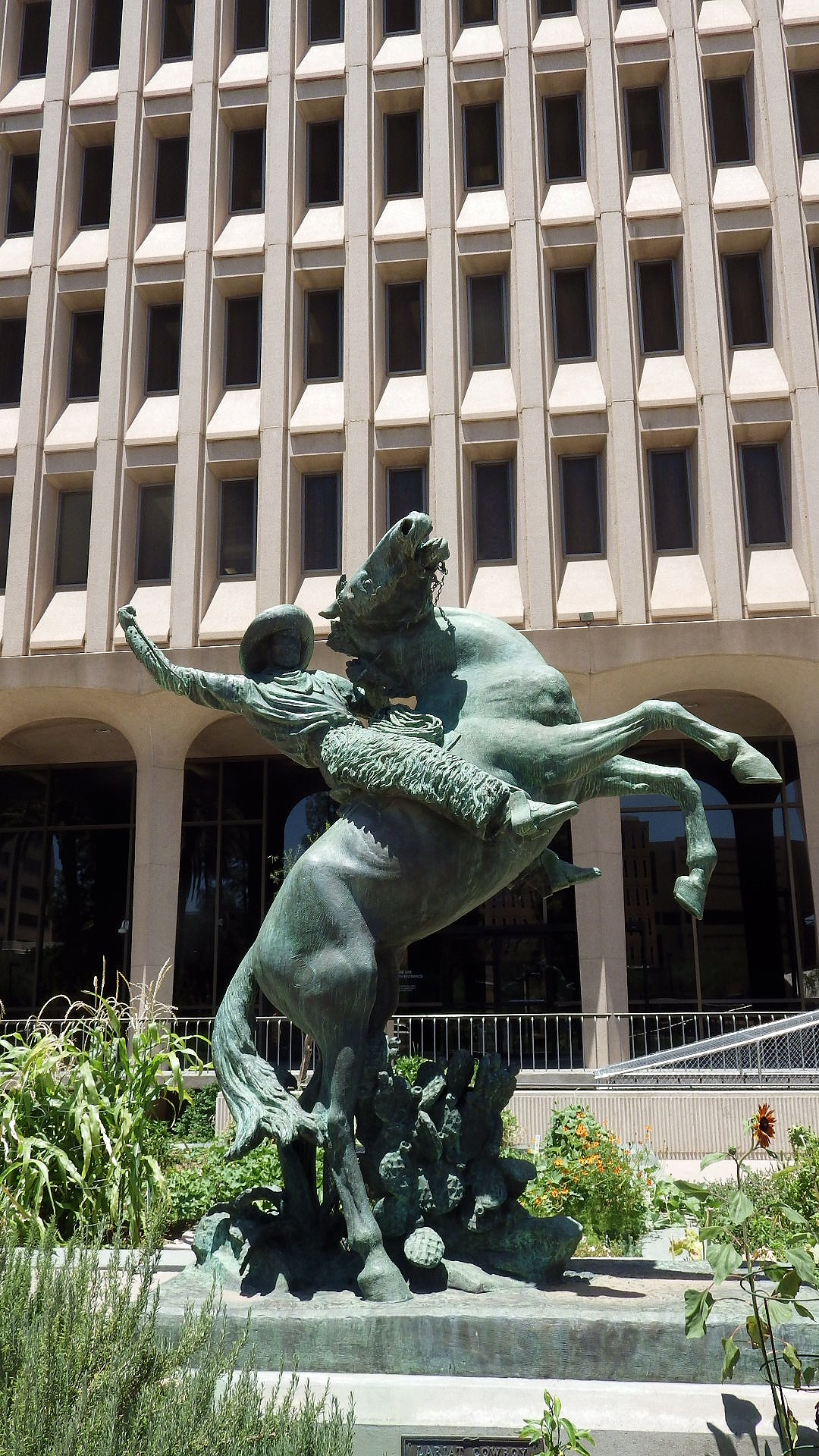
Lariat Cowboy', Phoenix

- Phoenix
  - Lariat Cowboy (1926) unveiled in Phoenix, April 21, 1954.
  - Eusebio Francisco Kino, by Julian Martinez, Wesley Bolin Memorial Plaza, 1967.
- Prescott
  - Bucky O'Neill Monument, by Solon Borglum, Yavapai County Courthouse Plaza, 1907.
  - Cowboy at Rest, by Skurja Art Casting, Yavapai County Courthouse Plaza, 1990. A copy after Solon Borglum's 1904 statue (destroyed).
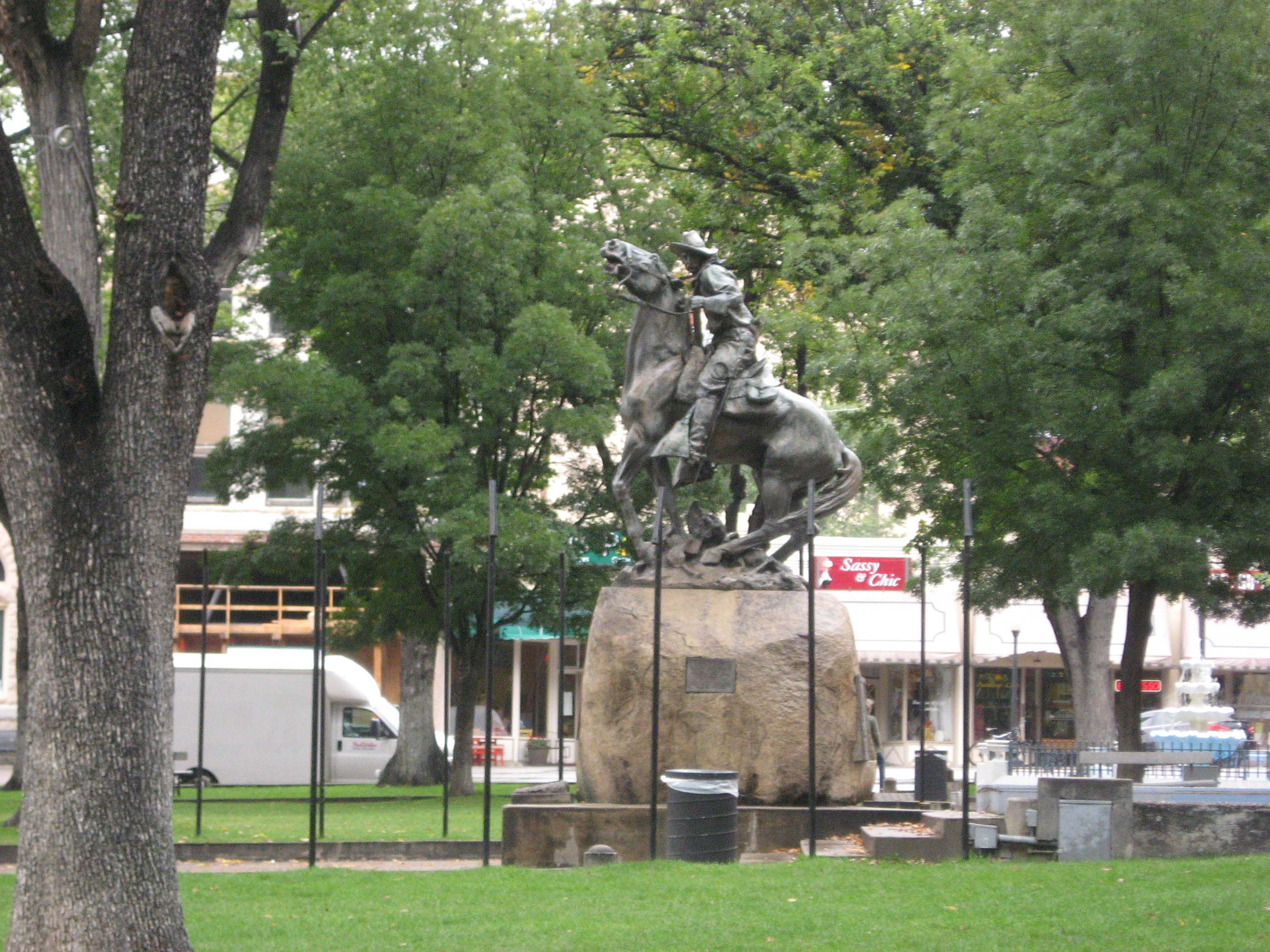
O'Neill

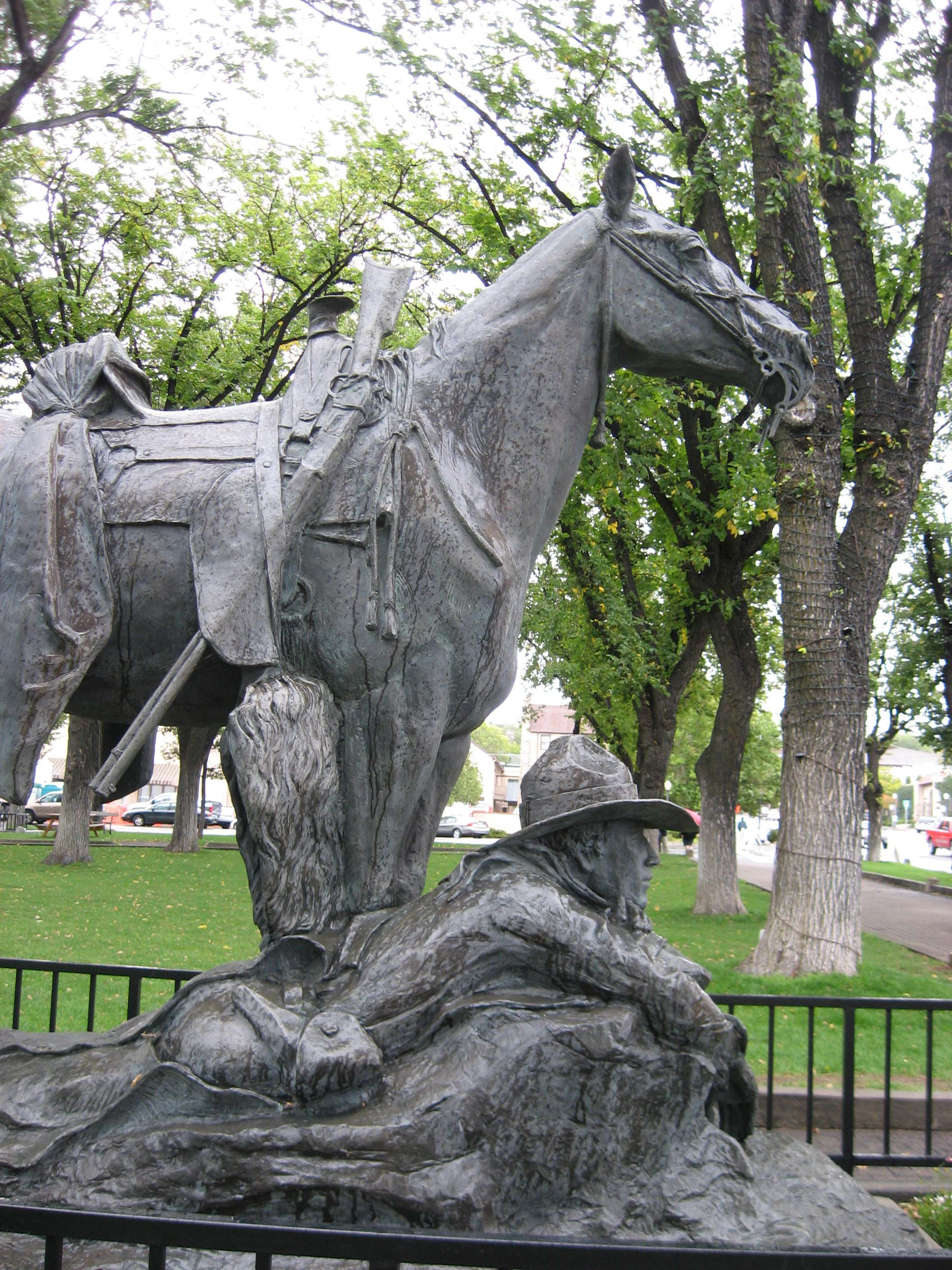
Cowboy at Rest
- Scottsdale
  - Come 'n Get It, by Snell Johnson, Rawhide, 1989–90.
  - Jack Knife, by Ed Mell, Main Street & Marshall Way, 1993.
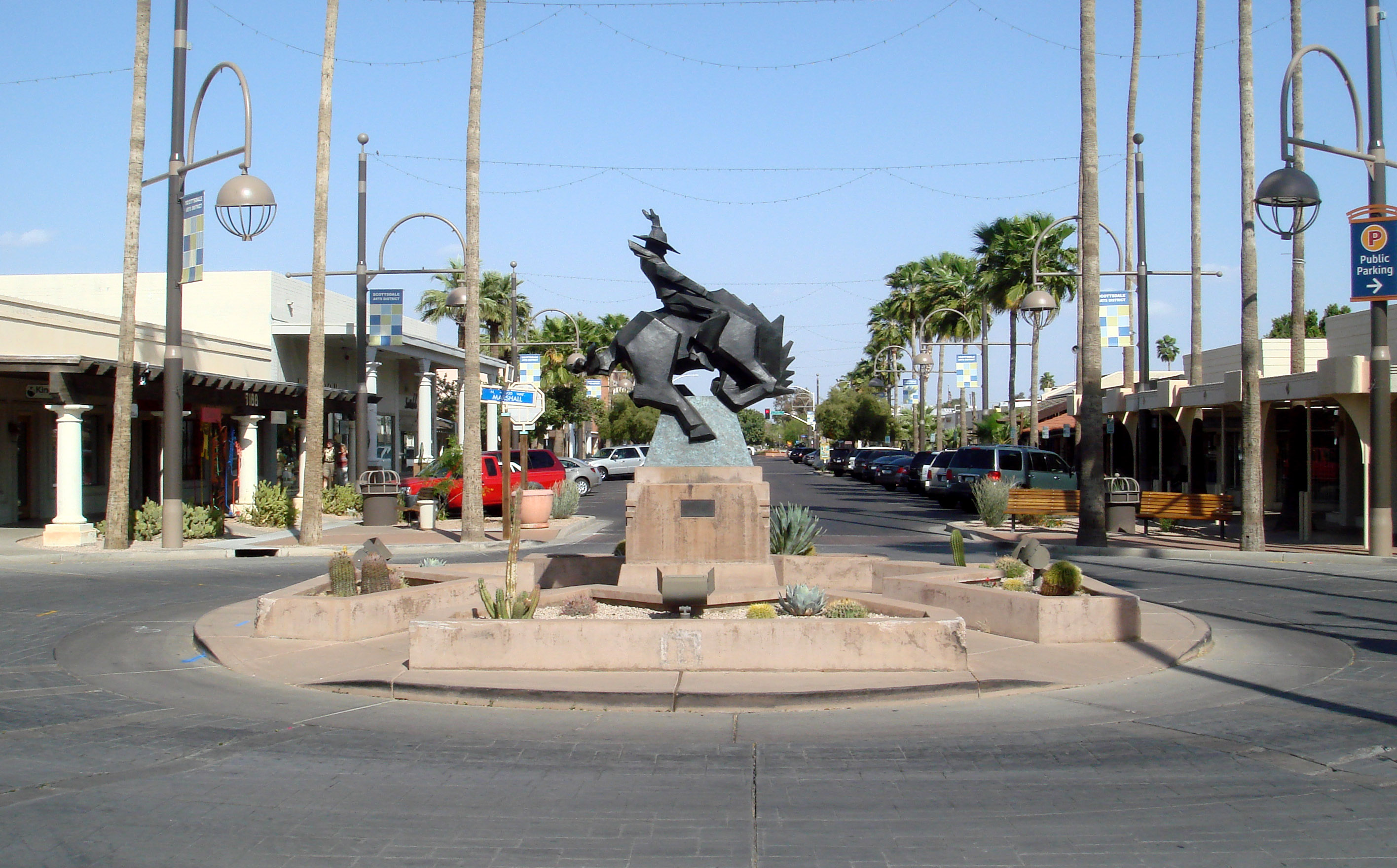
Jack Knife
- Tucson
  - Pancho Villa, by Julian Martinez, Veinte de Agosto Park, 1981.
  - Eusebio Francisco Kino, S.J., by Julian Martinez, Kino Boulevard, 1987–89.

=== Arkansas ===
- Ash Flat
  - Bronco Buster, by Frederic Remington, Remington Plaza Shopping Center, 1895, this cast ca. 2001.
  - Coming Through the Rye, by Frederic Remington (smaller version), Remington Plaza Shopping Center, 1902, this cast ca. 2001.
  - The Rattlesnake, by Frederic Remington, Remington Plaza Shopping Center, 1909, this cast ca. 2001.
- Hot Springs
  - American Pharoah (of the 2015 Triple Crown-winning horse and jockey Victor Espinoza), by James Peniston, Oaklawn Park Race Track, 2017.
  - Horse and Rider Group, by Barvo Walker, Oaklawn Park Race Track, 1985–86.
  - Horse and Rider, by Jan Woods, Oaklawn Park Race Track, 1991.
  - Rockamundo (Racehorse and jockey), by Alan Gipson, Oaklawn Park Race Track, 1989–90.
- Jonesboro
  - Bronco Buster, by Frederic Remington, Indian Mall, 1895.
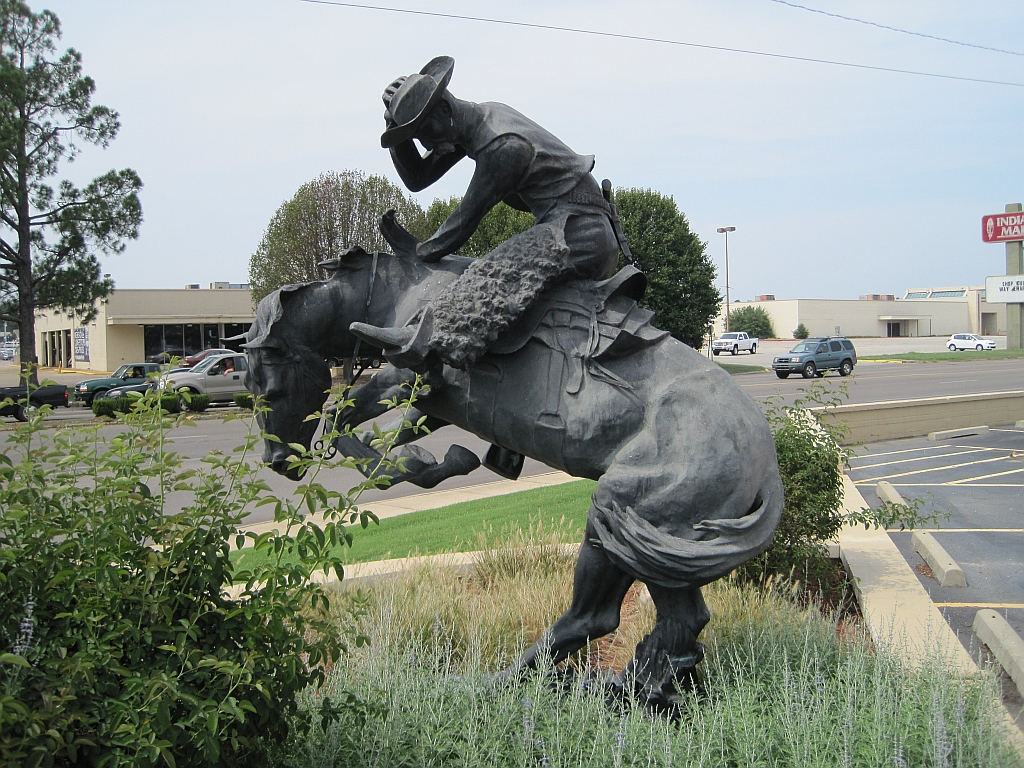
    Bronco Buster
  - The Cheyenne, by Frederic Remington (smaller version), Caraway Plaza Shopping Center, 1901.
  - End of the Trail, by James Earle Fraser (smaller version), Caraway Plaza Shopping Center, 1894.
  - Mountain Man, by Frederic Remington, Bernard Court Shopping Center, 1903.
- North Little Rock
  - Pioneering is Eternal, by Jack Bryant Jr., Ben E. Keith Foods, 2006.
- Ozark
  - Bas-relief plaque of Dispatch Rider, by Joseph B. Bond, Sam Dale Monument, Dale County Lake, 1976.
- Springdale
  - Bas-relief of Birdman, by Jack D. Woods, Tyson Foods Corporate Headquarters, 1987.

=== California ===
- Antioch
  - Spirit Rider of the Season, by David Govedare, Wildhorse Road, 1993. Steel silhouettes of four horses, one rider.
- Beverly Hills
  - John Wayne, by Harry Jackson, Great Western Bank, 1984.
- Inglewood
  - Swaps (Racehorse & Jockey), by Albert Stewart, Hollywood Park Racetrack, 1955.
- Los Angeles
  - Emiliano Zapata, by Ignacio Asunsolo, Lincoln Park (Los Angeles), 1908.
  - Angel of the Citadel, by Marino Marini, J. Paul Getty Museum, 1948, this cast 1950.
  - Equestrian statue of José María Morelos (Los Angeles), by Julián Martínez, Lincoln Park (Los Angeles), 1981.
  - Equestrian statue of Antonio Aguilar, by Dan Medina, El Pueblo de Los Angeles Historical Monument, 2012.
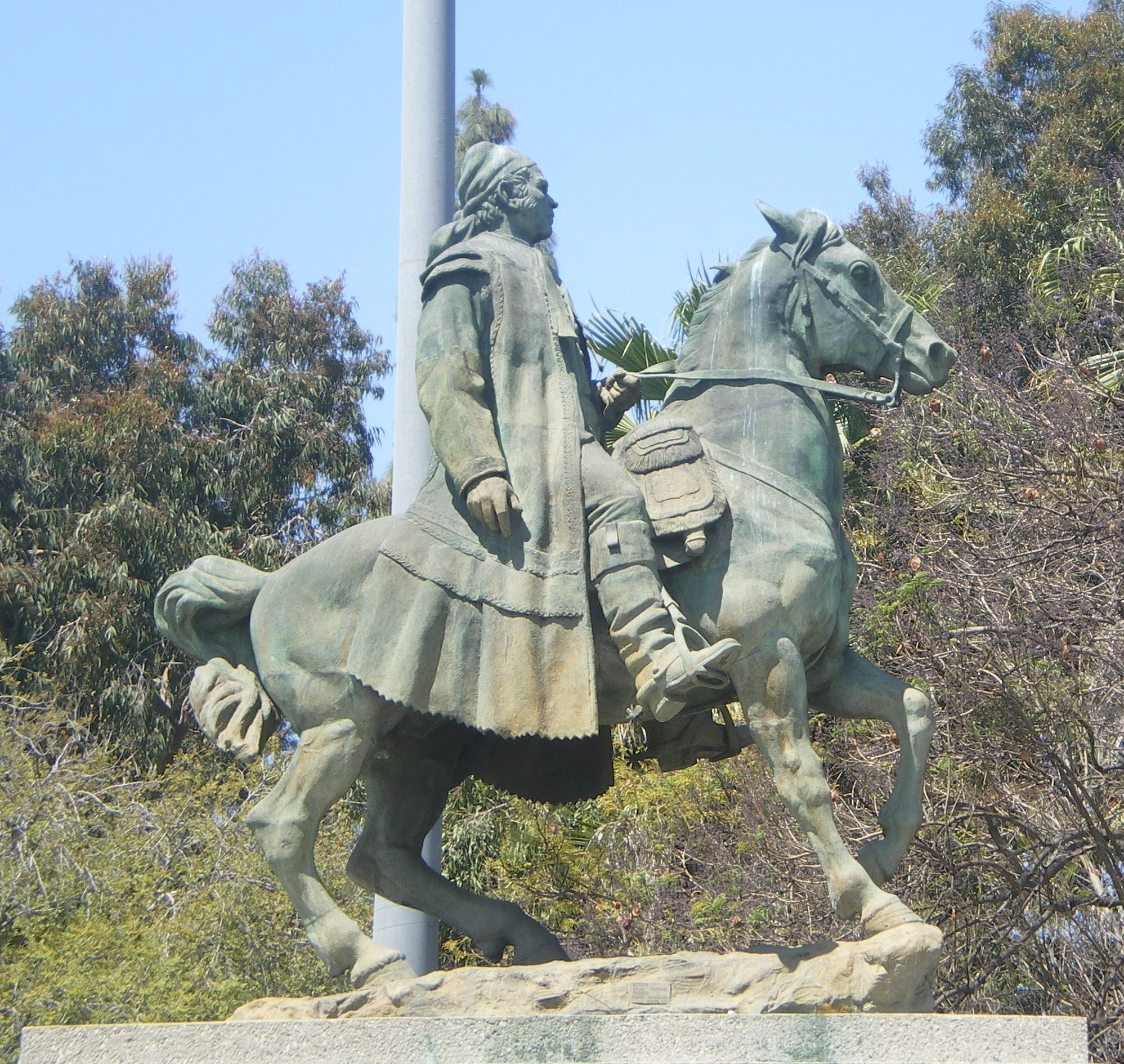
Equestrian statue of José María Morelos

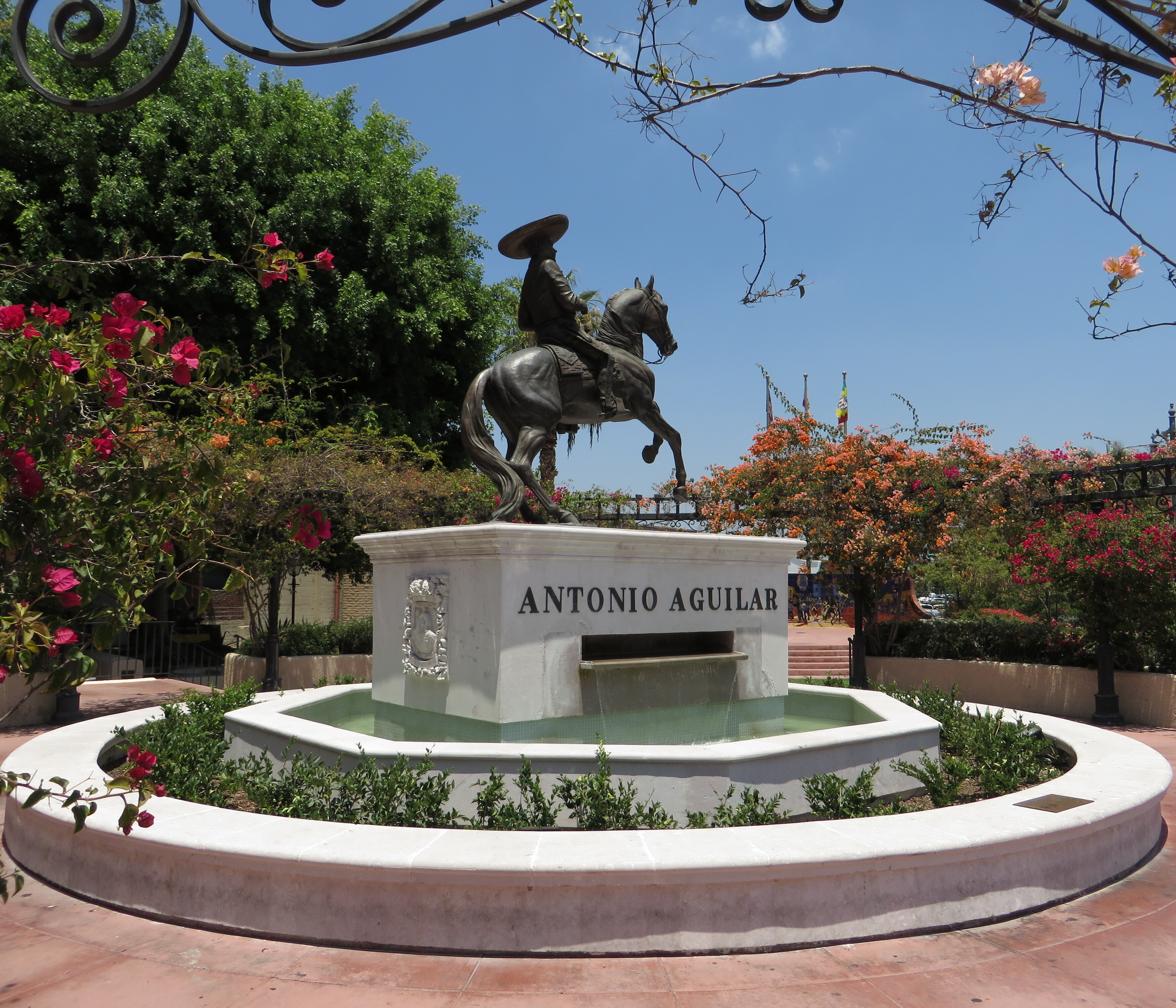
Equestrian statue of Antonio Aguilar
- Los Banos
  - Henry Miller, by Betty Saletta, 2005.
- Oakland
  - Joaquin Miller – Poet of the Sierras, by Kisa Beeck, Joaquin Miller Park, 1942.
- Sacramento
  - Pony Express Rider, by Thomas Holland, 2nd & J Streets, 1976.
  - Indian Being Attacked by a Bear, by Spero Anargyros, west pediment, California State Capitol, 1981–82. Recreation of Pietro Mezzara's 1873 statue (lost or destroyed).
  - Woman Being Attacked by a Buffalo, by Spero Anargyros, west pediment, California State Capitol, 1981–82. Recreation of Pietro Mezzara's 1873 statue (lost or destroyed).
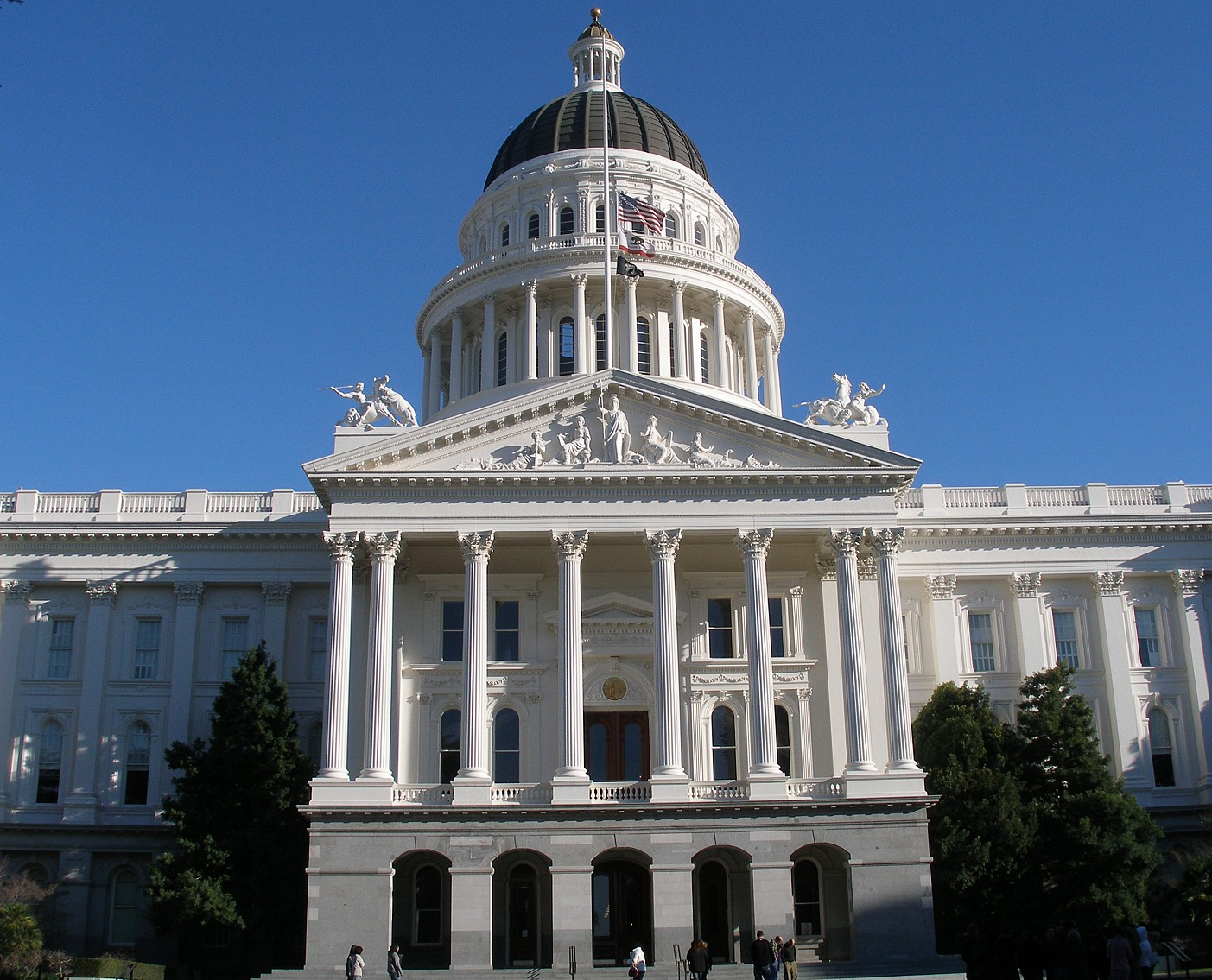
California State Capitol
- Salinas
  - Bas-reliefs, by Jo Mora, Monterey County Courthouse, 1937.
- San Diego
  - El Cid, by Anna Hyatt Huntington, Balboa Park, 1923–30.
  - Youth Taming the Wild (Horse Trainer), by Anna Hyatt Huntington, Balboa Park, 1927, this cast ca. 1930–34.
  - L'Idea del Cavaliere, by Marino Marini, San Diego Museum of Art, 1955.
  - El Charro, by Juan Fernando Olaguibel, Presidio Park, 1969–70.
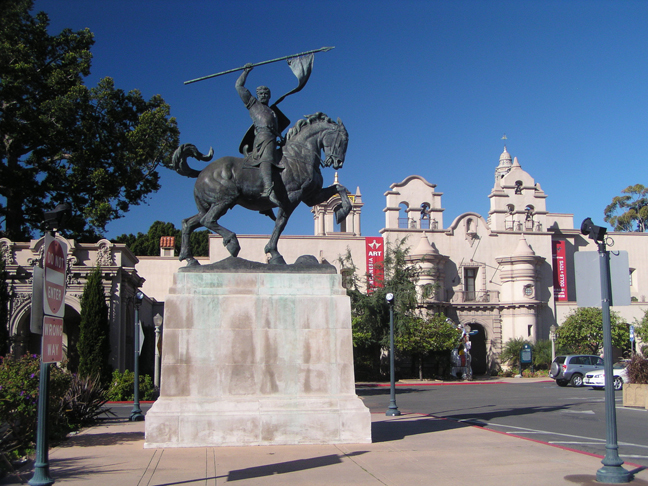
El Cid

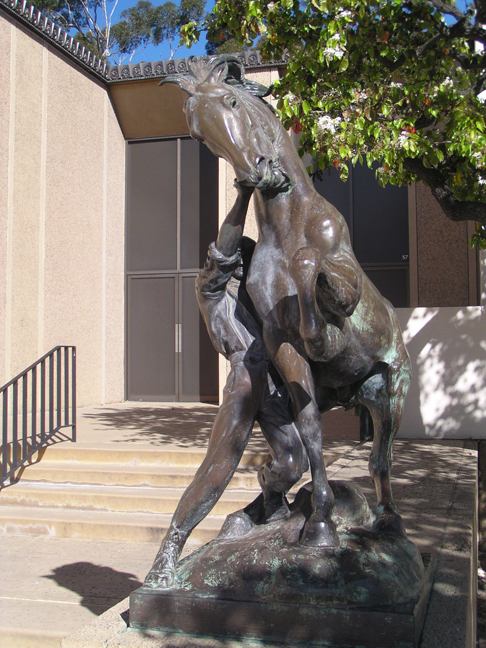
Youth Taming the Wild
- San Francisco
  - California Volunteers, by Douglas Tilden, Spanish American War Memorial, Dolores & Market Streets, 1906.
  - Fountain of Energy, by A. Stirling Calder, Panama–Pacific International Exposition, 1915 (demolished).
  - Joan of Arc, by Anna Hyatt Huntington, California Palace of the Legion of Honor, ca. 1922.
  - Simón Bolívar, United Nations Plaza, 1981–84. A copy after Adamo Tadolini's 1874 statue in Caracas, Venezuela.
  - El Cid, by Anna Hyatt Huntington, Lincoln Park (San Francisco), 1921, this cast 1927.
  - Horse and Rider, by Beniamino Bufano, Westside Court Apartments, 1935–40.
  - Captain Juan Bautista de Anza, by Julian Martinez, Justin Herman Plaza, 1967.
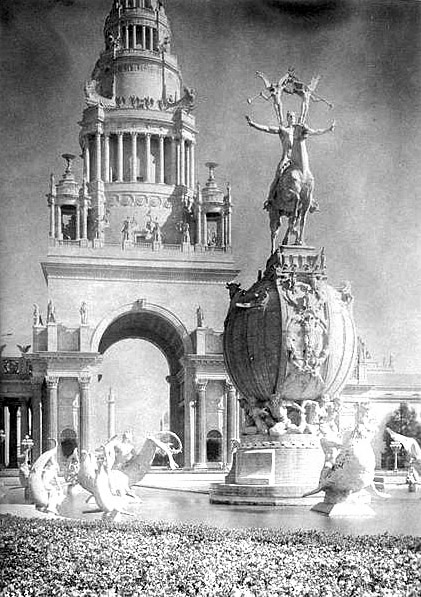
Fountain of Energy

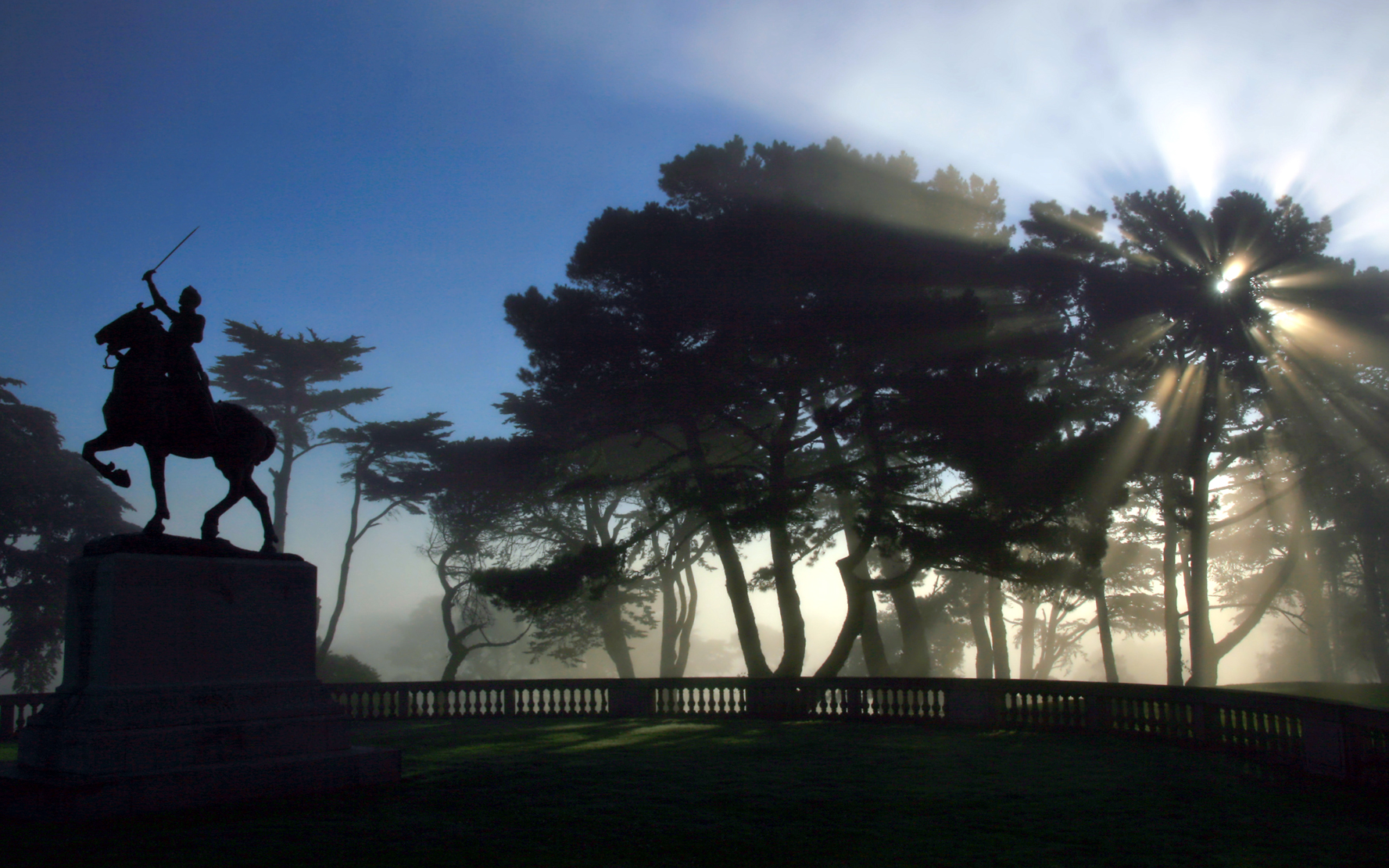
Joan of Arc

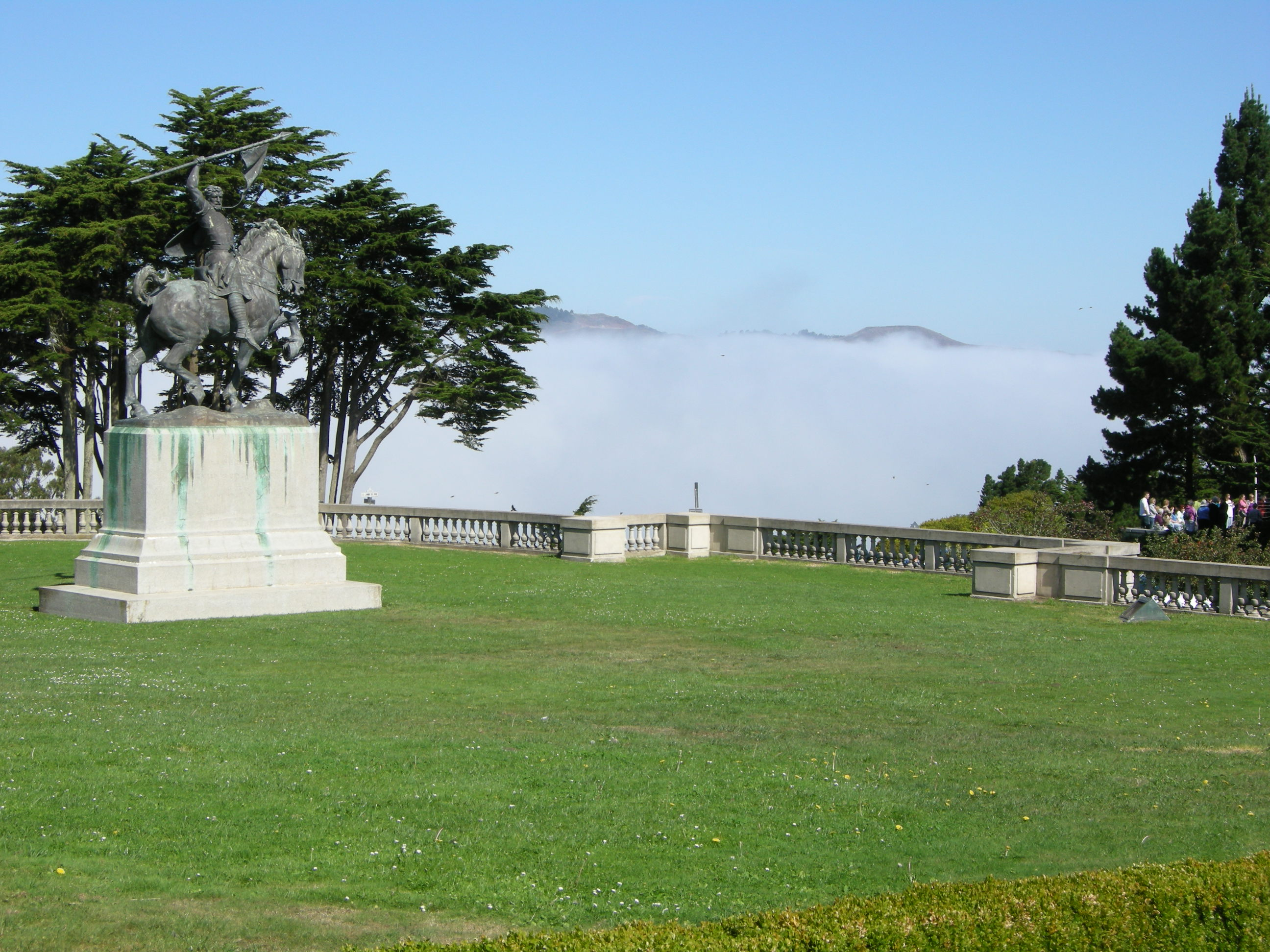
El Cid

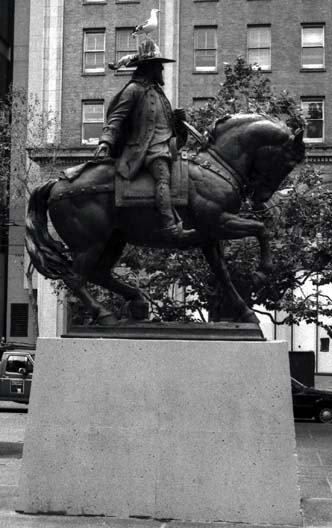
de Anza
- Santa Barbara
  - California Cowboy, by Duke Sedgwick, Earl Warren Showgrounds, 1967.
- Visalia
  - End of the Trail, by James Earle Fraser, Mooney's Grove Park, 1915, this cast 1971.

=== Colorado ===
- Colorado Springs
  - William Jackson Palmer, by Nathan Potter, General William J. Palmer High School, 1929.
  - Blota Hunka (Warrior of the Plains), by Don and Charles Green, Colorado Springs Airport, 1980–81.
  - The Champ (Casey Tibbs), by Edd Hayes, ProRodeo Hall of Fame, 1989.
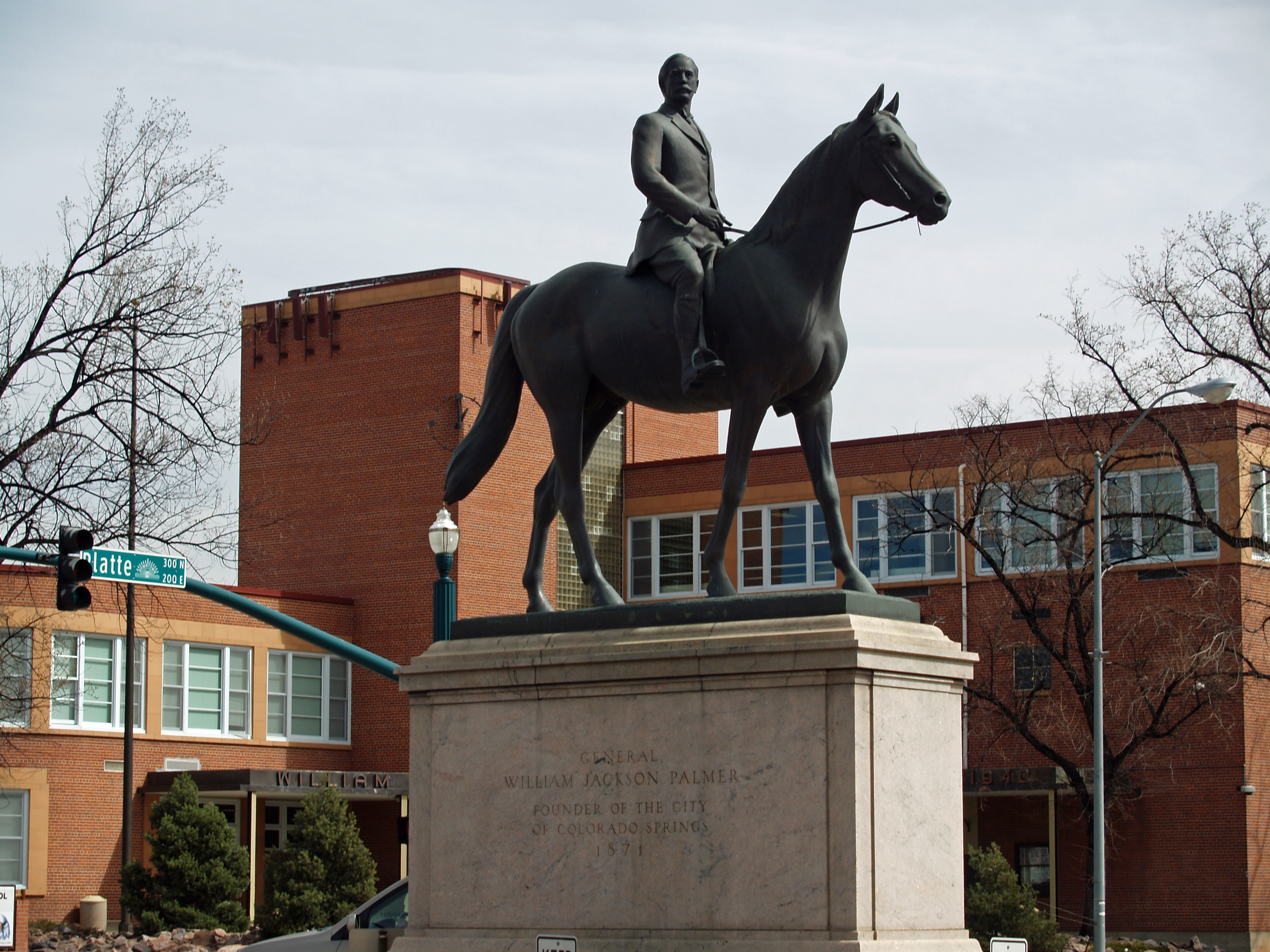
Palmer
- Denver
  - Kit Carson, atop the Pioneer Monument, by Frederick MacMonnies, Civic Center Park, 1919.
  - Bronco Buster, by Alexander Phimister Proctor, Civic Center Park, 1920.
  - On the Warpath, by Alexander Phimister Proctor, Civic Center Park, 1923.
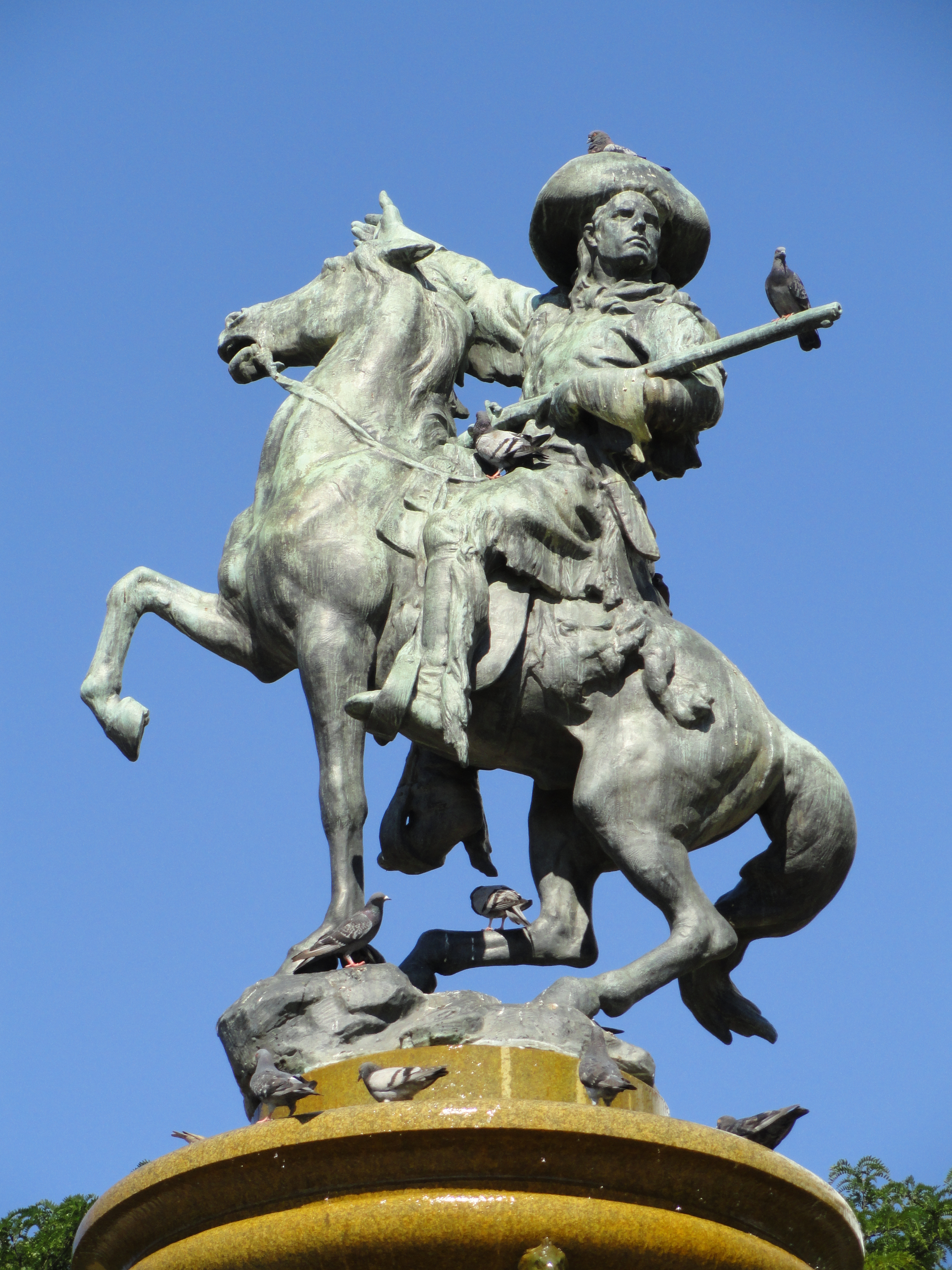
Carson

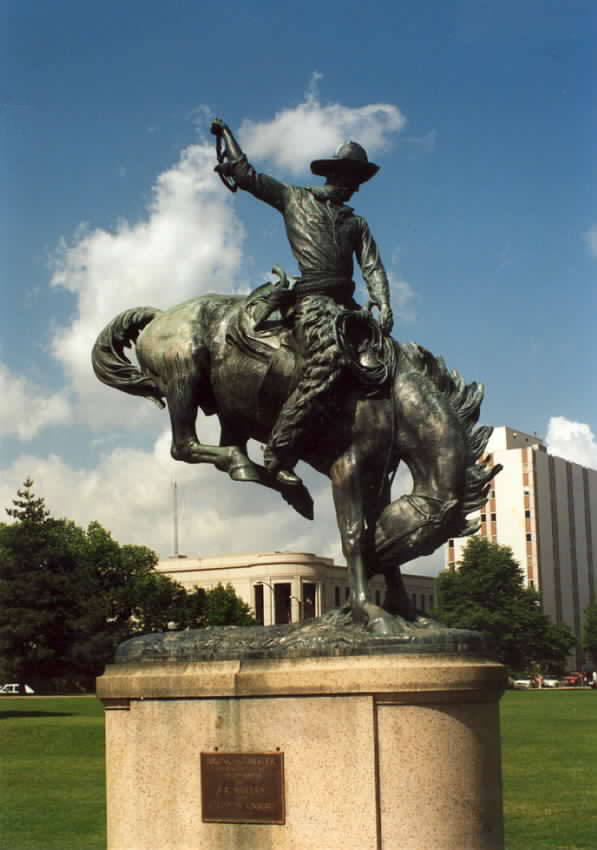
Bronco Buster

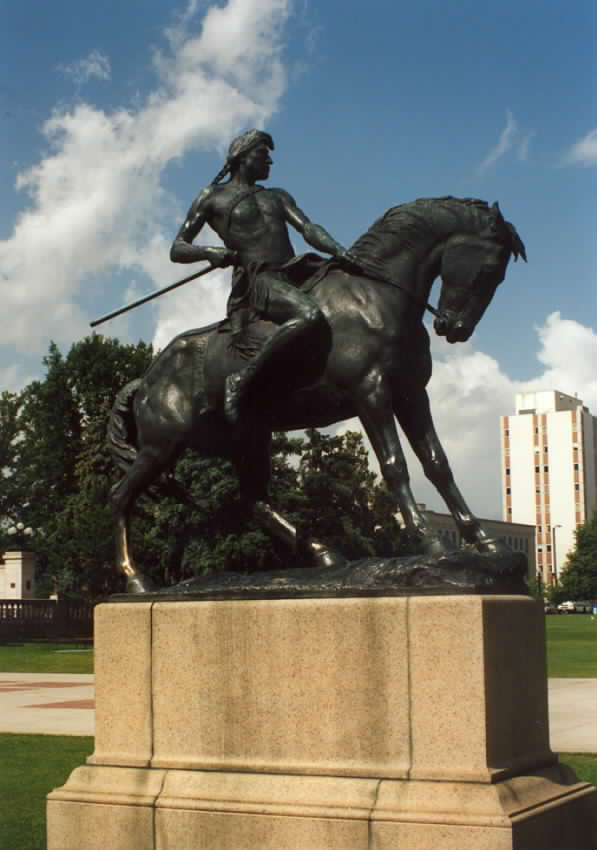
On the Warpath
- Julesburg
  - Pony Express Rider, by Brenda Jean Daniher, Fort Sedgwick Museum, 2001.
- Trinidad
  - Christopher "Kit" Carson, by Augustus Lukeman (Carson figure) and Frederick Roth (horse), Kit Carson Park, dedicated 1913.
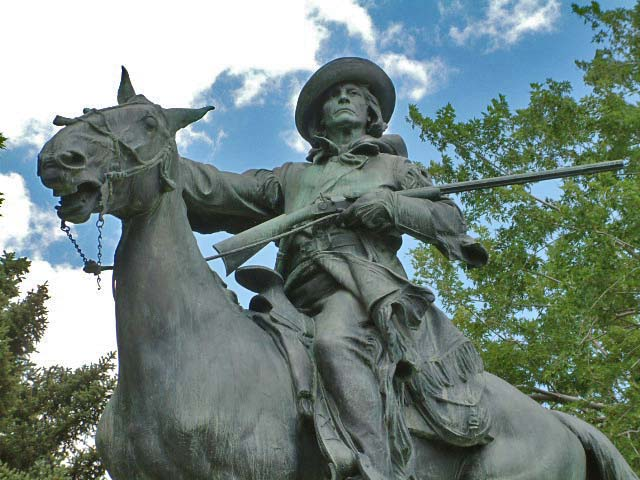
Christopher ("Kit") Carson

=== Connecticut ===
- Bethel
  - Young Abe Lincoln, by Anna Hyatt Huntington, Bethel Public Library, 1961.
- Bridgeport
  - The Torch Bearers, by Anna Hyatt Huntington, Discovery Museum and Planetarium, ca. 1963.
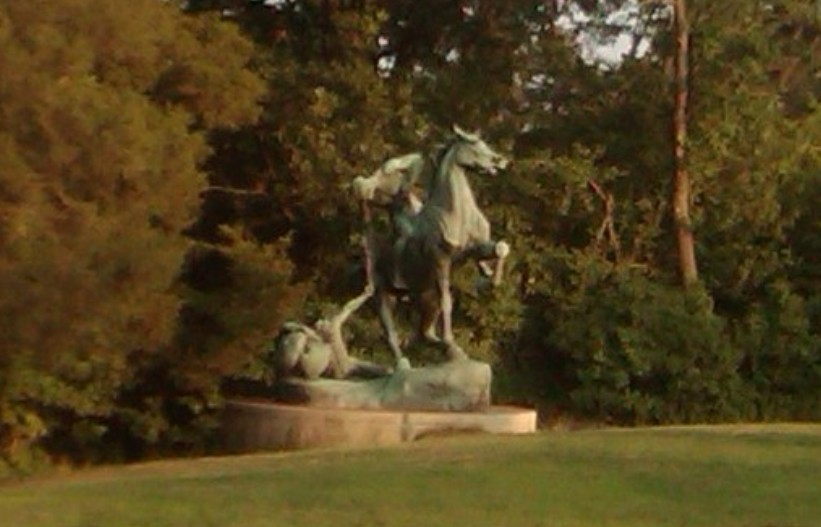
The Torch Bearers
- Brooklyn
  - Israel Putnam Monument, by Karl Gerhardt, South Cemetery, 1888. The statue is depicted on Brooklyn's town seal.
Putnam
- Danbury
  - Sybil Ludington (smaller version), by Anna Hyatt Huntington, Danbury Public Library, 1960.
- Hartford
  - Marquis de Lafayette, by Paul Wayland Bartlett, Lafayette Circle, 1907, this casting 1932.
  - Count Casimir Pulaski, by Granville Carter, Pulaski Plaza Mall, 1973–76.
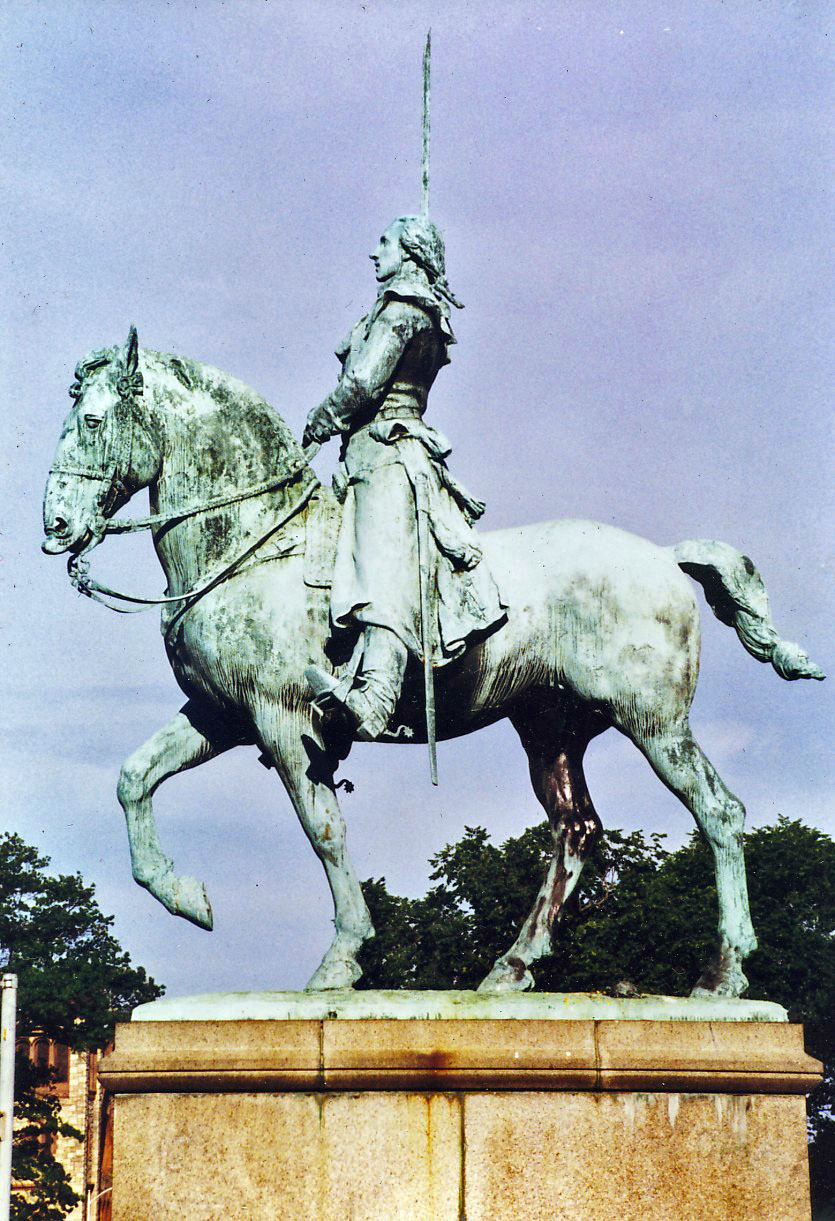
Lafayette
- Redding
  - General Israel Putnam, by Anna Hyatt Huntington, Putnam Memorial State Park, 1967.

=== Delaware ===
- Wilmington
  - Caesar Rodney, by James Edward Kelly, Rodney Square, 1922–23.
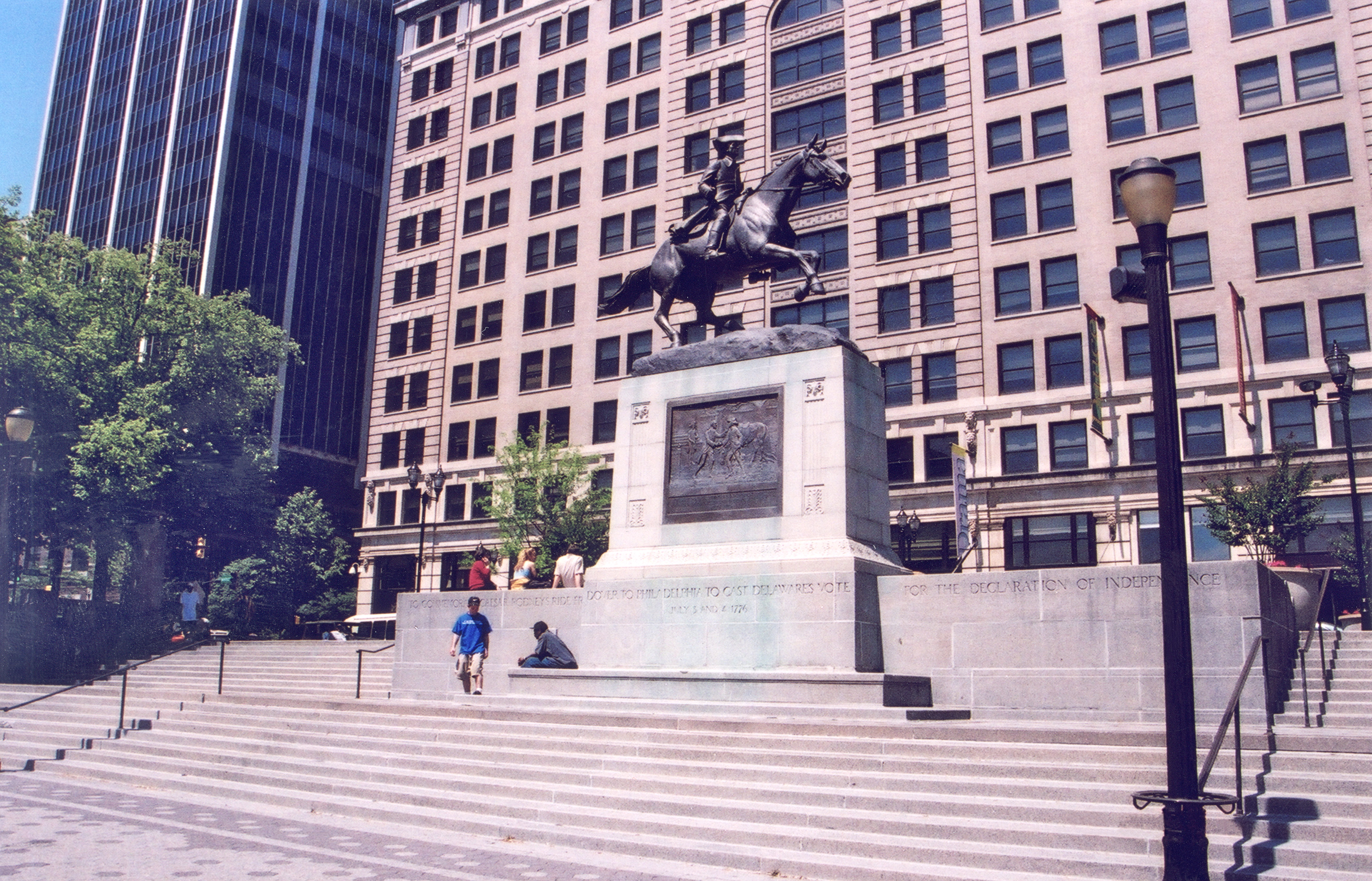
Rodney

=== District of Columbia ===
  - Andrew Jackson, by Clark Mills, Lafayette Square, 1852. The oldest equestrian statue in Washington, DC.
  - Lieutenant General George Washington, by Clark Mills, Washington Circle, 1860.
  - Brevet Lt. General Winfield Scott, by Henry Kirke Brown, Scott Circle, 1874.
  - General James B. McPherson, by Louis Rebisso, McPherson Square, 1876.
  - General Nathanael Greene, by Henry Kirke Brown, Stanton Square, 1877.
  - Major General George Henry Thomas, by John Quincy Adams Ward, Thomas Circle, 1878–79.
  - Major General John A. Logan, by Franklin Simmons, Logan Circle, 1893.
  - General Winfield Scott Hancock by Henry Jackson Ellicott, 1896
  - General William Tesumseh Sherman, by Carl Rohl-Smith, General William Tecumseh Sherman Monument, President's Park, 1898–1903.
  - Ulysses S. Grant Memorial, west side of the U.S. Capitol, 1902–22:
    - Ulysses S. Grant, by Henry Merwin Shrady.
    - Cavalry Charge, by Henry Merwin Shrady.
    - Artillery, by Henry Merwin Shrady.
  - Major General George B. McClellan, by Frederick William MacMonnies, Connecticut Avenue, 1907.
  - Equestrian statue of Philip Sheridan, by Gutzon Borglum, Sheridan Circle, 1908.
  - Brigadier General Count Casimir Pulaski, by Kazimierz Chodziński, Freedom Plaza, 1910.
  - General Simón Bolívar, by Emile Antoine Bourdelle, Courtyard of the Organization of American States Building, 1914, this cast 1984.
  - Reverend Francis Asbury, by Augustus Lukeman, 16th & Mount Pleasant Streets NW, 1921.
  - Joan of Arc, by Paul DuBois, Meridian Hill Park, 1922.
  - General Jose de San Martin Memorial, by Augustin-Alexandre Dumont, Foggy Bottom, 1924.
  - The Arts of War: Sacrifice, by Leo Friedlander, Arlington Memorial Bridge, 1929–51.
  - The Arts of War: Valor, by Leo Friedlander, Arlington Memorial Bridge, 1929–51.
  - Reverend John Wesley, by Arthur George Walker, Wesley Theological Seminary, 1932, this cast 1961.
  - General George Washington, by Herbert Haseltine, Washington National Cathedral grounds, 1959. Washington is seated astride Haseltine's 1934 statue of the racehorse Man o' War.
  - General Simón Bolívar, by Felix de Weldon, 18th Street at Virginia Avenue, 1959.
  - General Bernardo de Gálvez, by Juan de Ávalos, near the State Department, 1976.
  - Colonel Michael Kovats de Fabriczy, by Paul Takacs, Embassy of the Republic of Hungary, 2003.
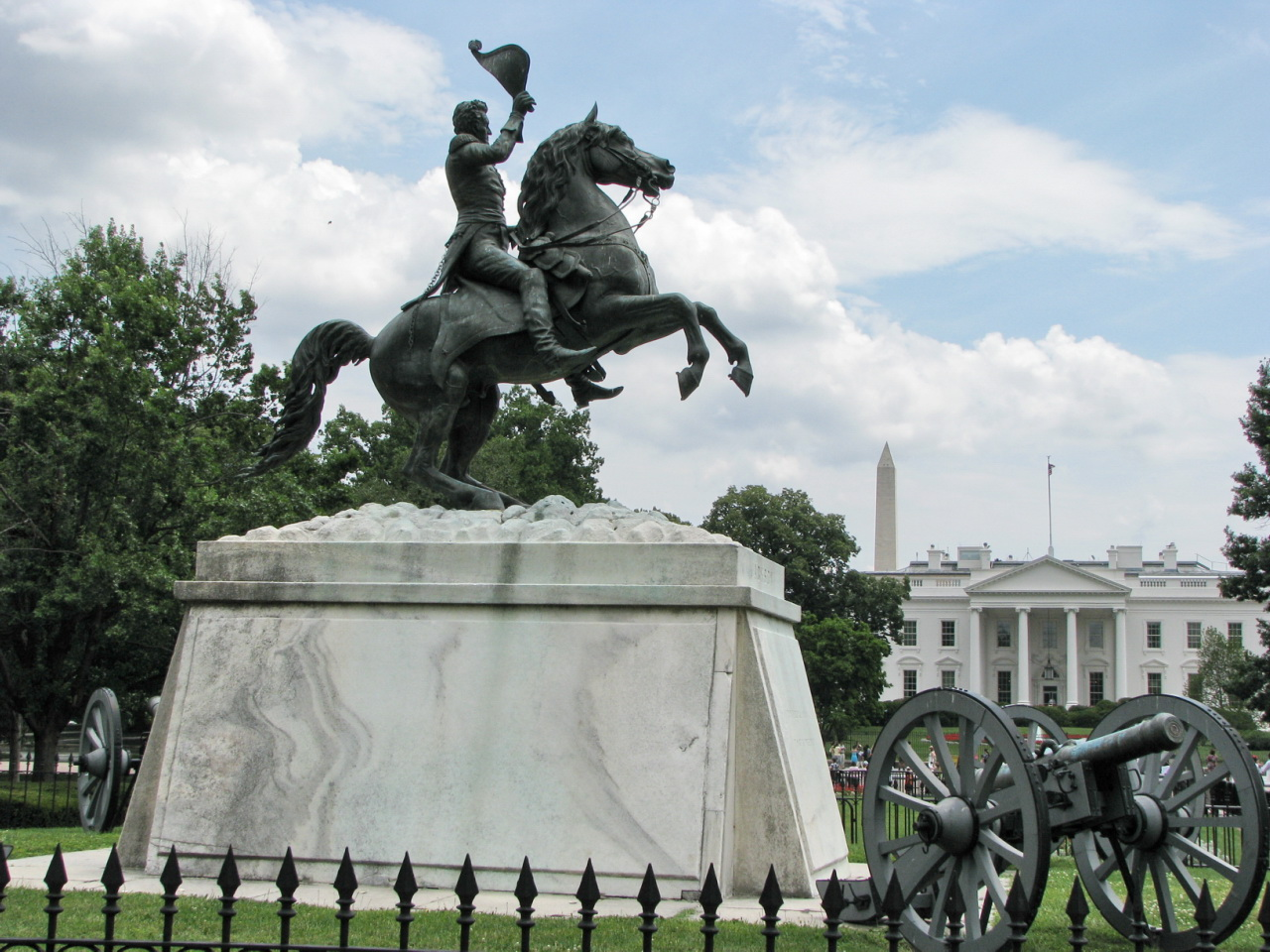
Jackson

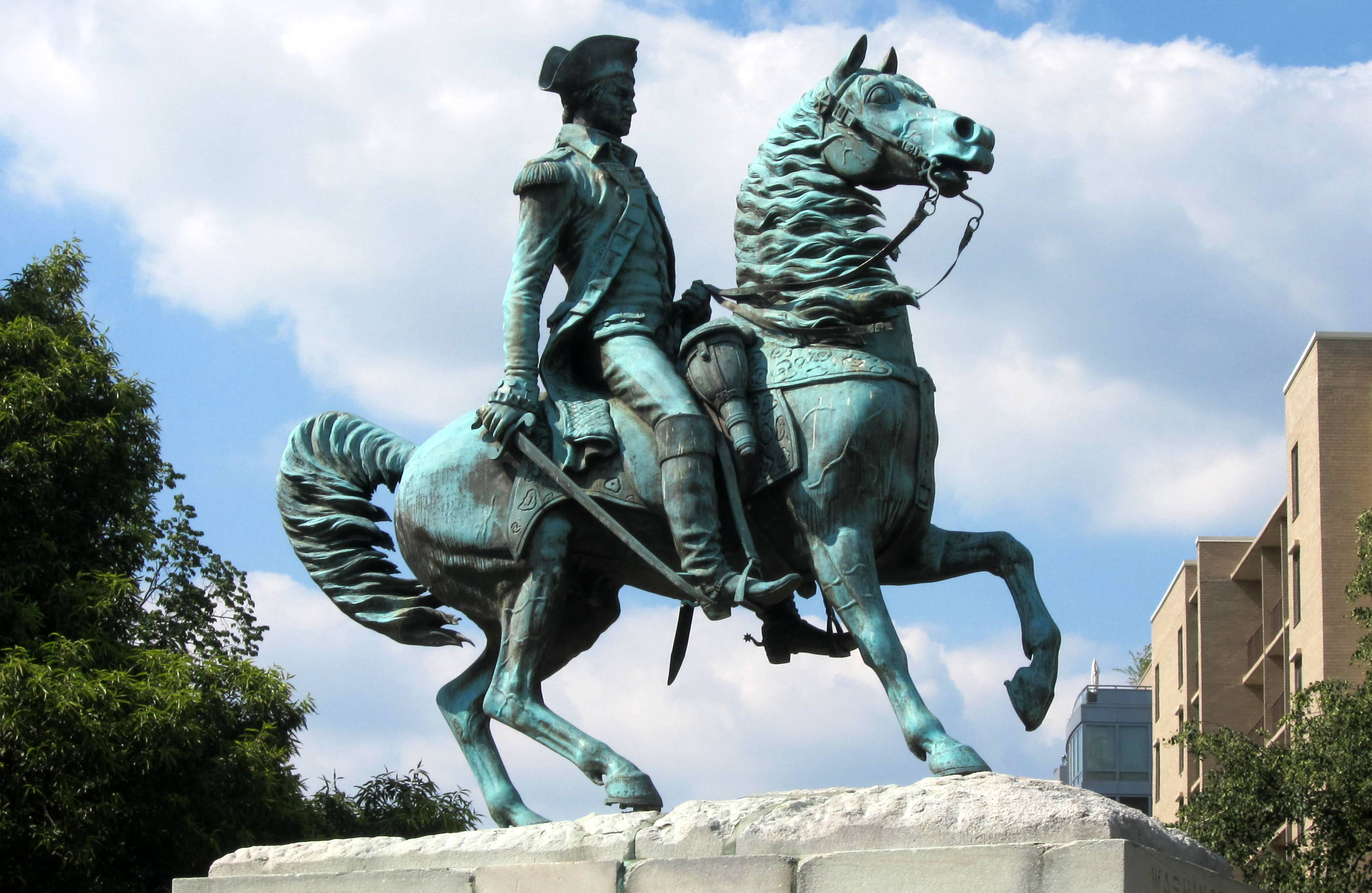
Washington by Mills

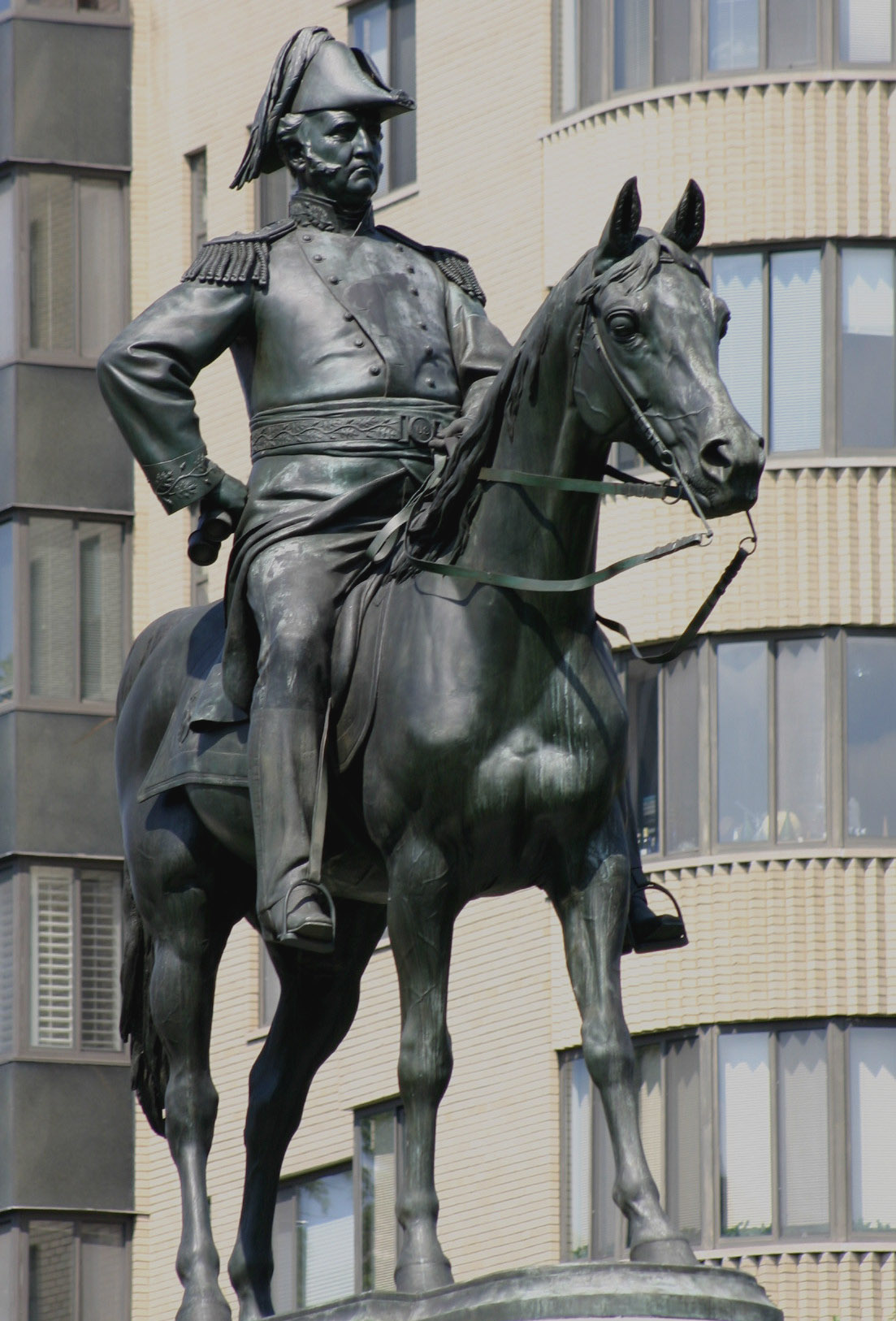
Scott by Brown

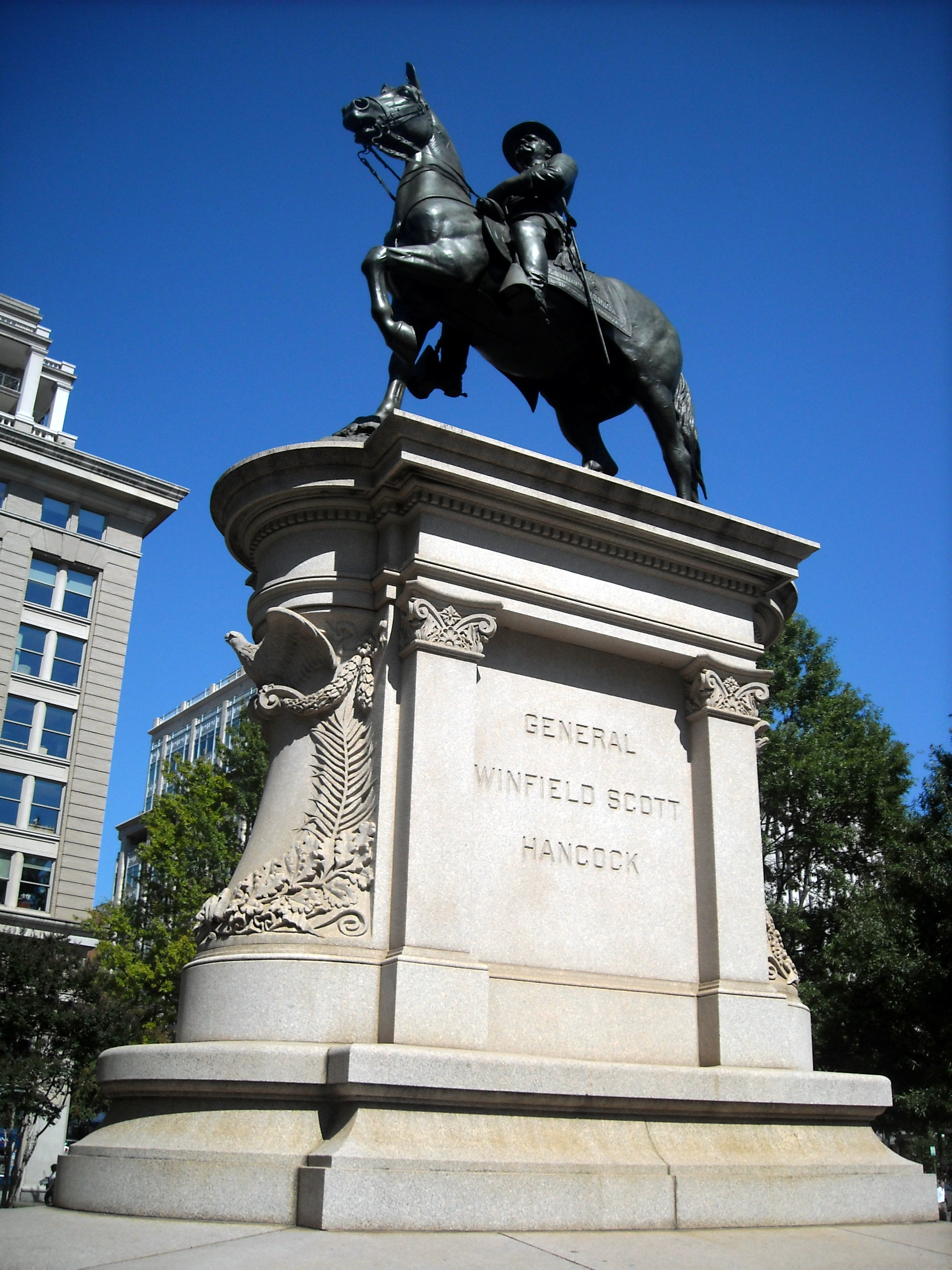
Winfield Scott Hancock

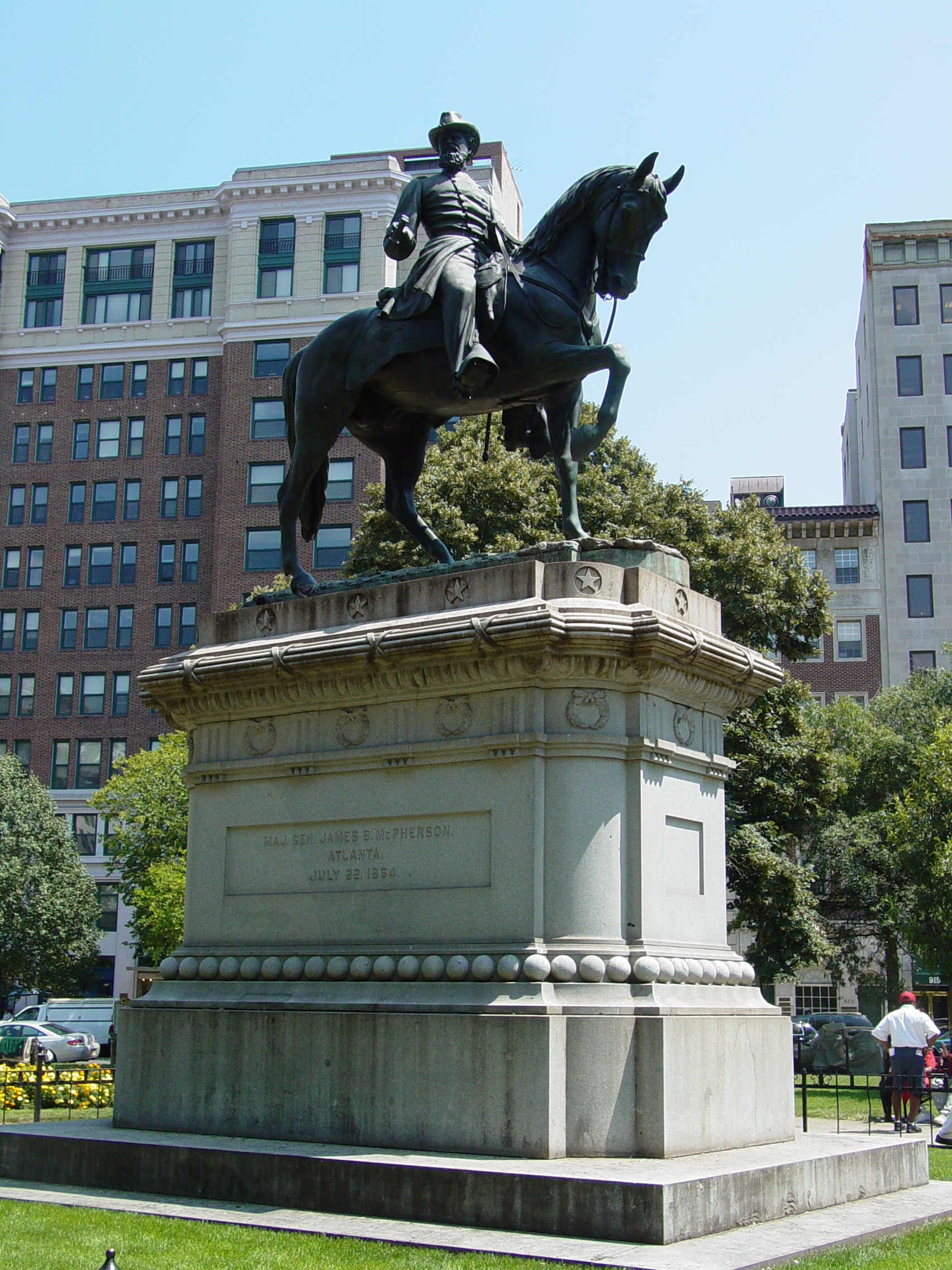
McPherson

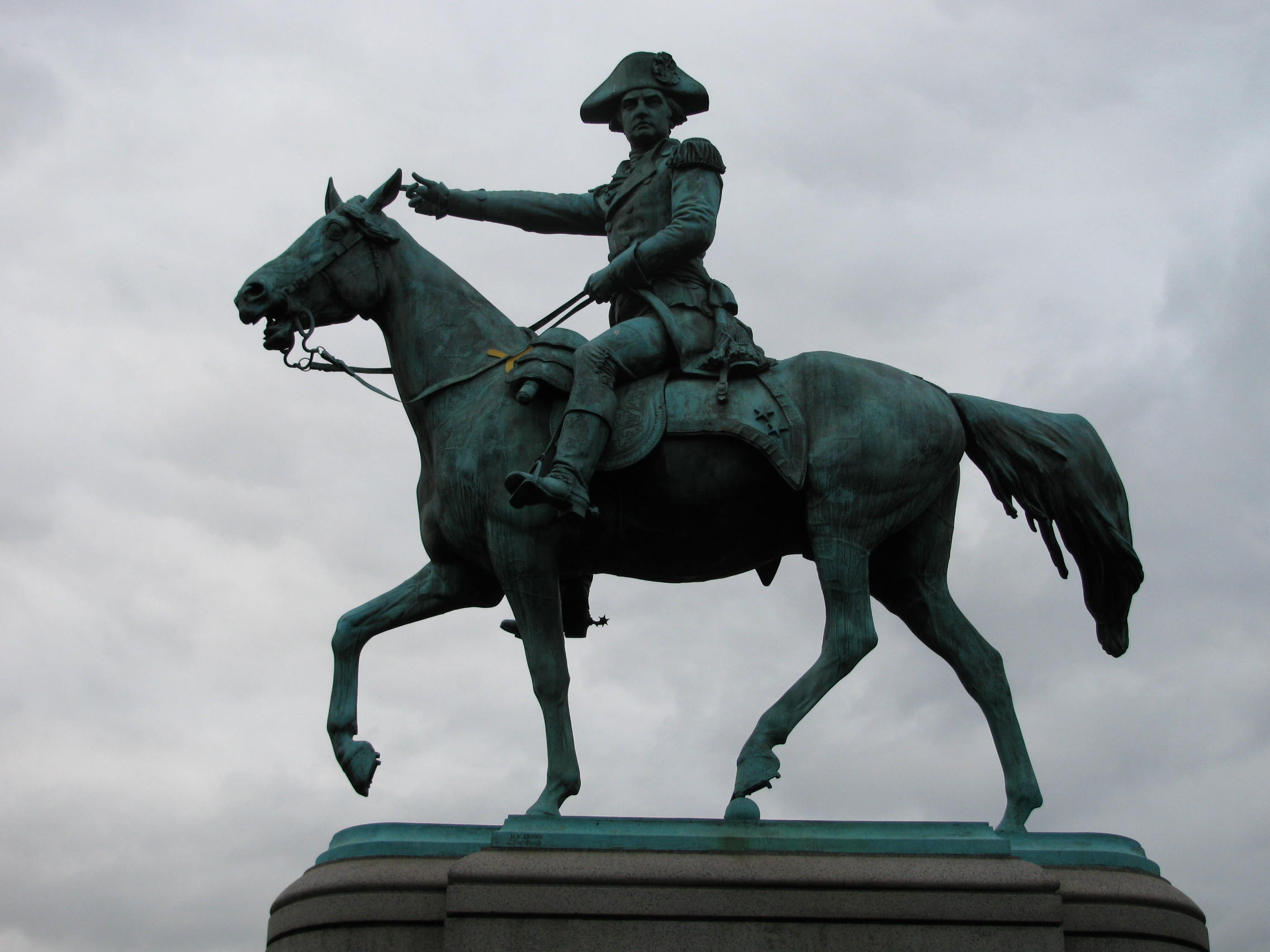
Greene

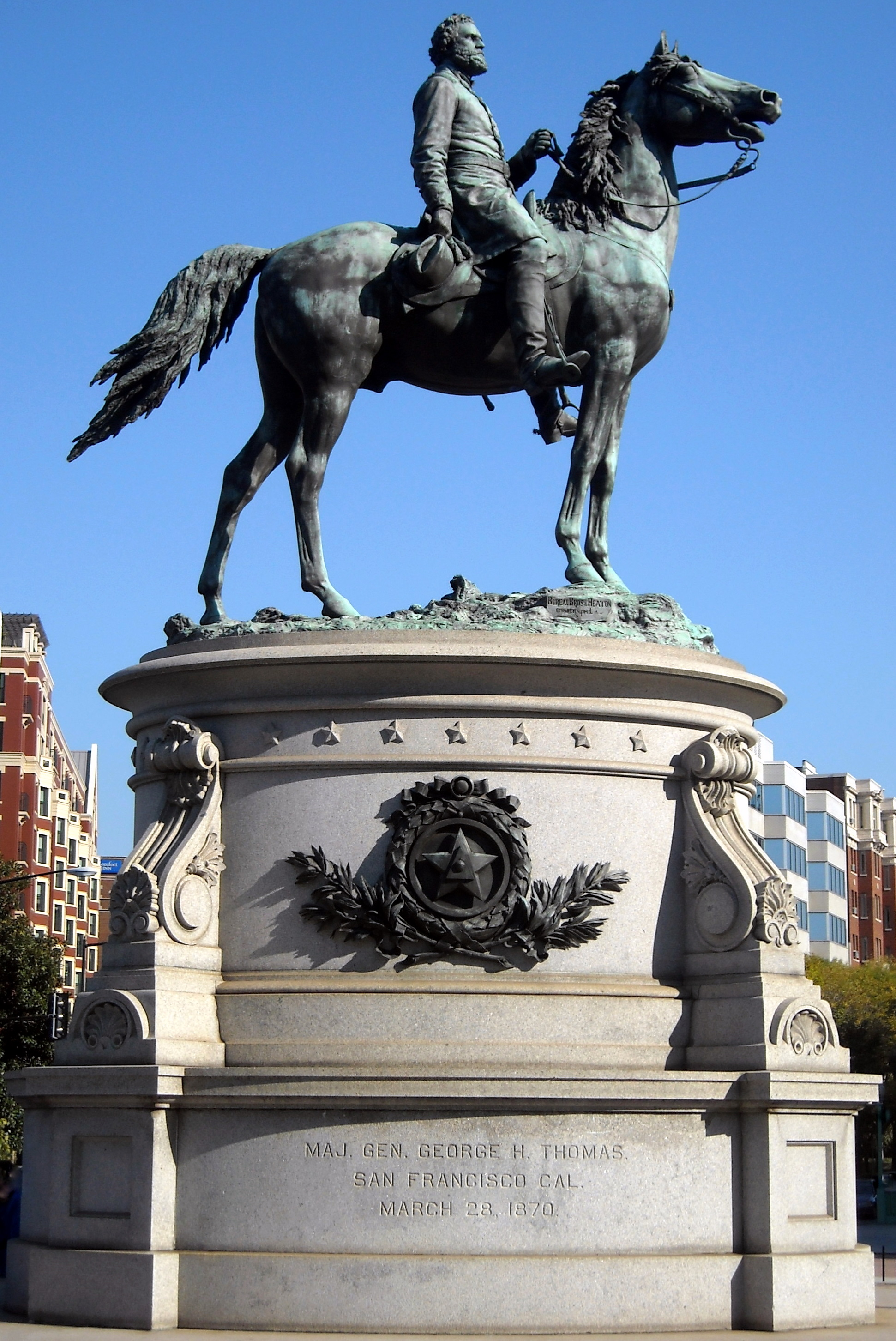
Thomas

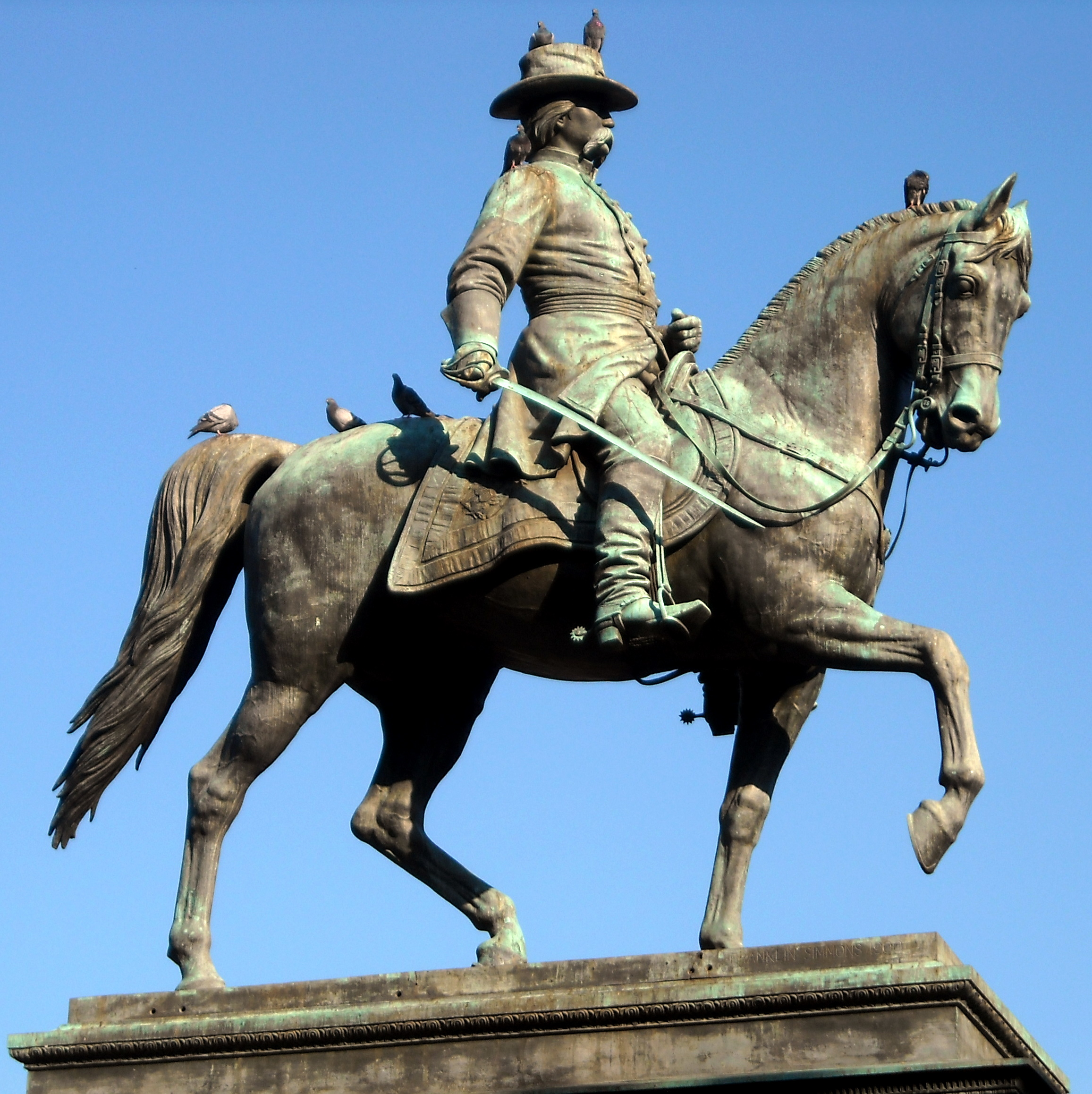
Logan

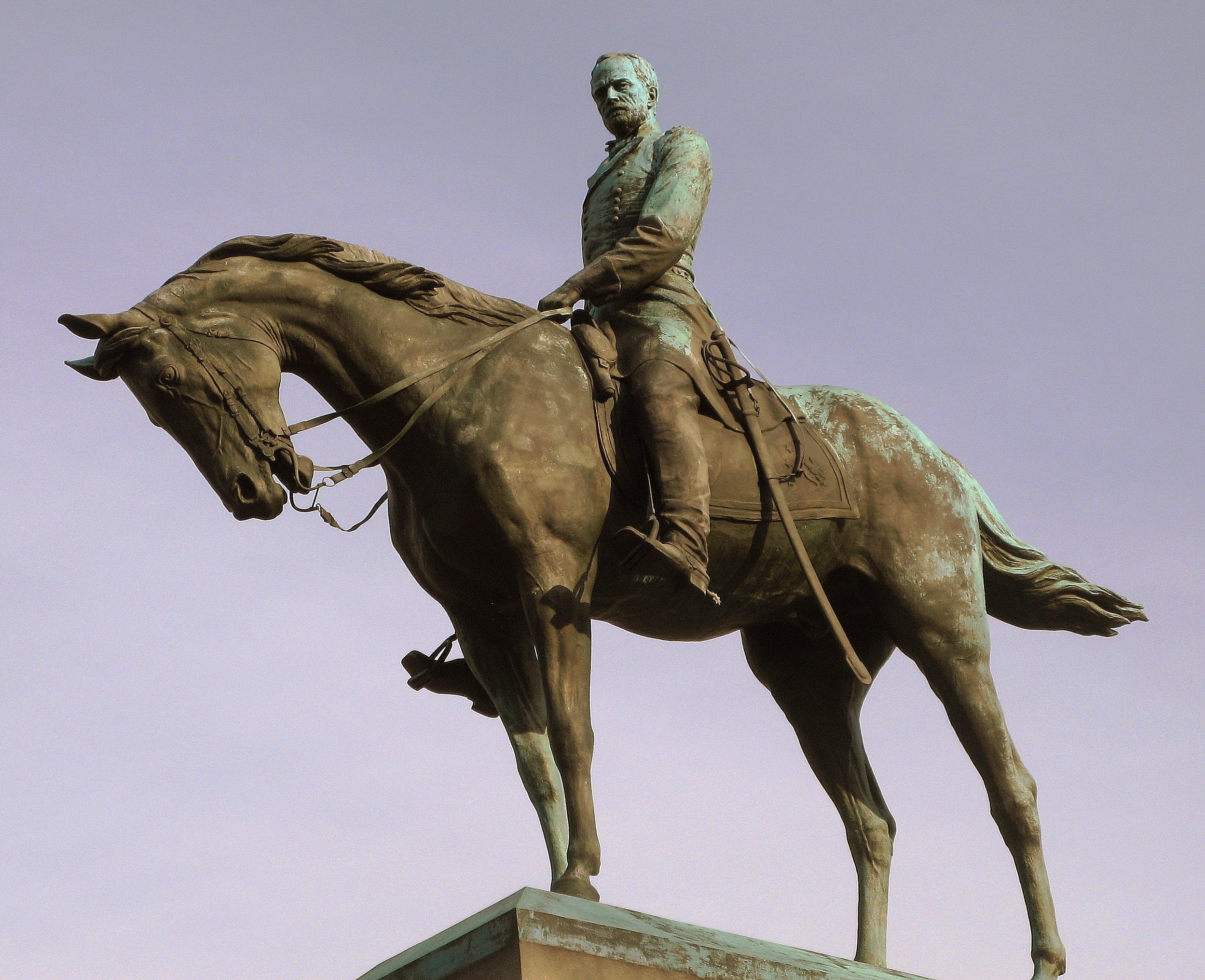
Sherman

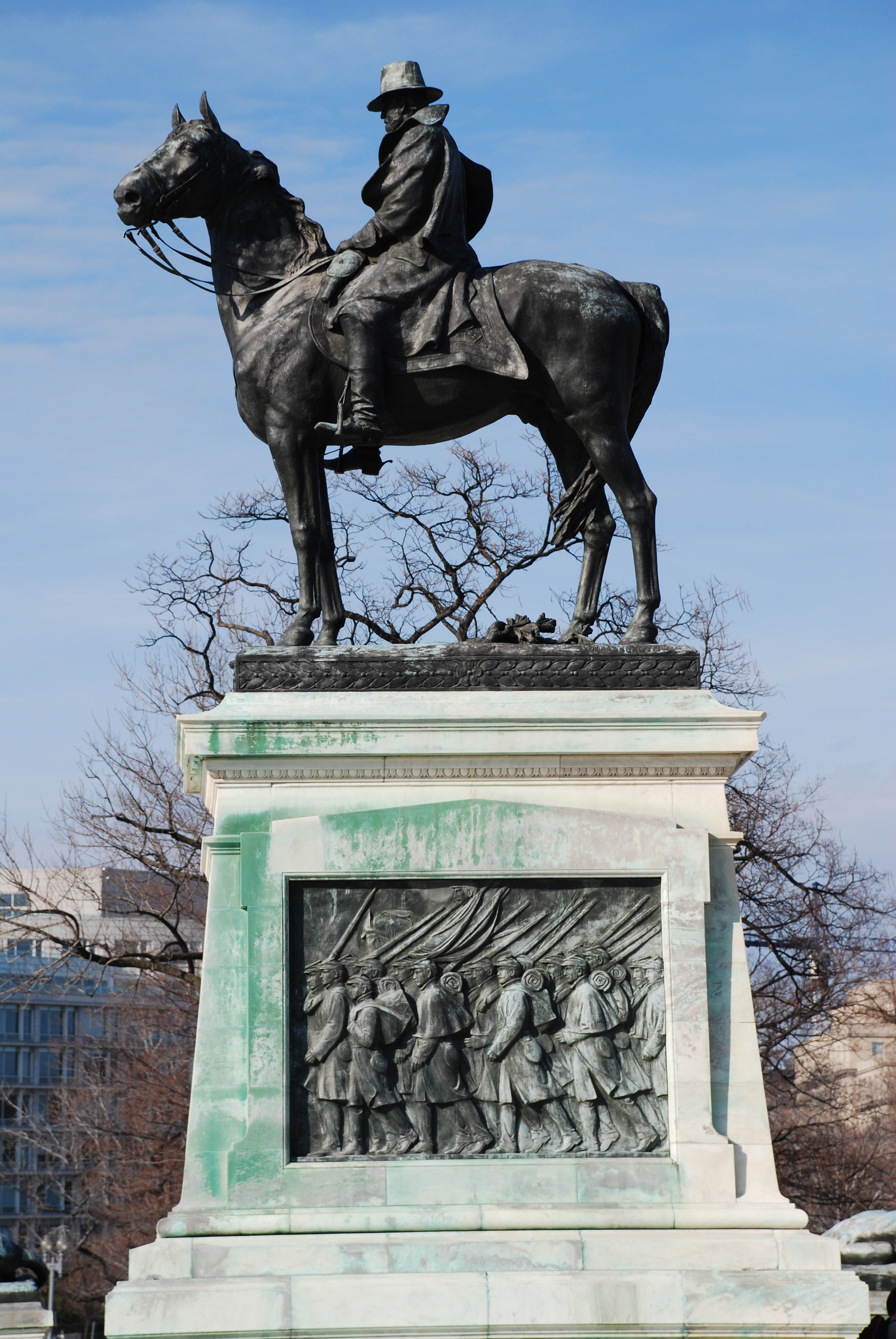
Grant

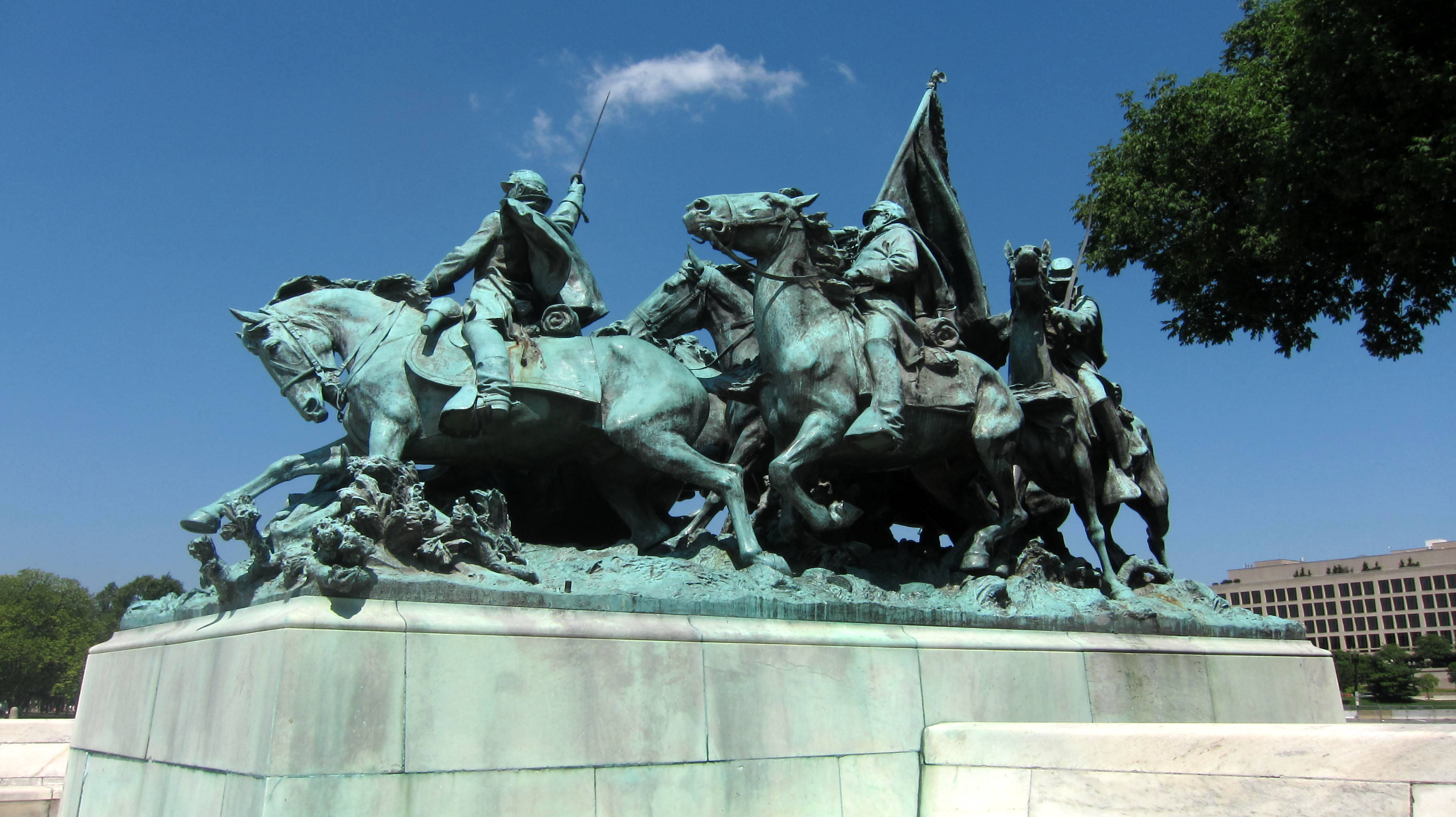
Cavalry Charge

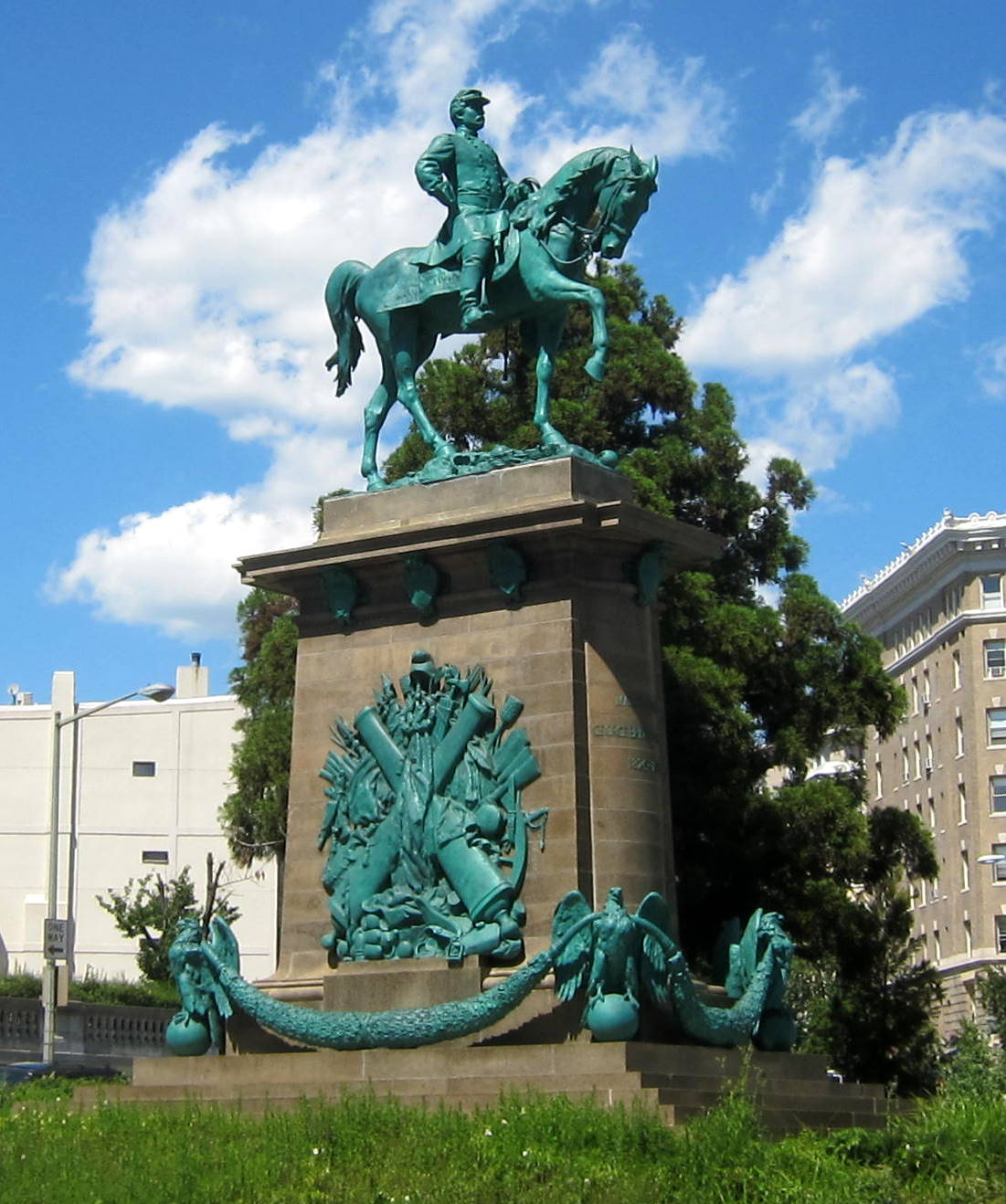
McClellan

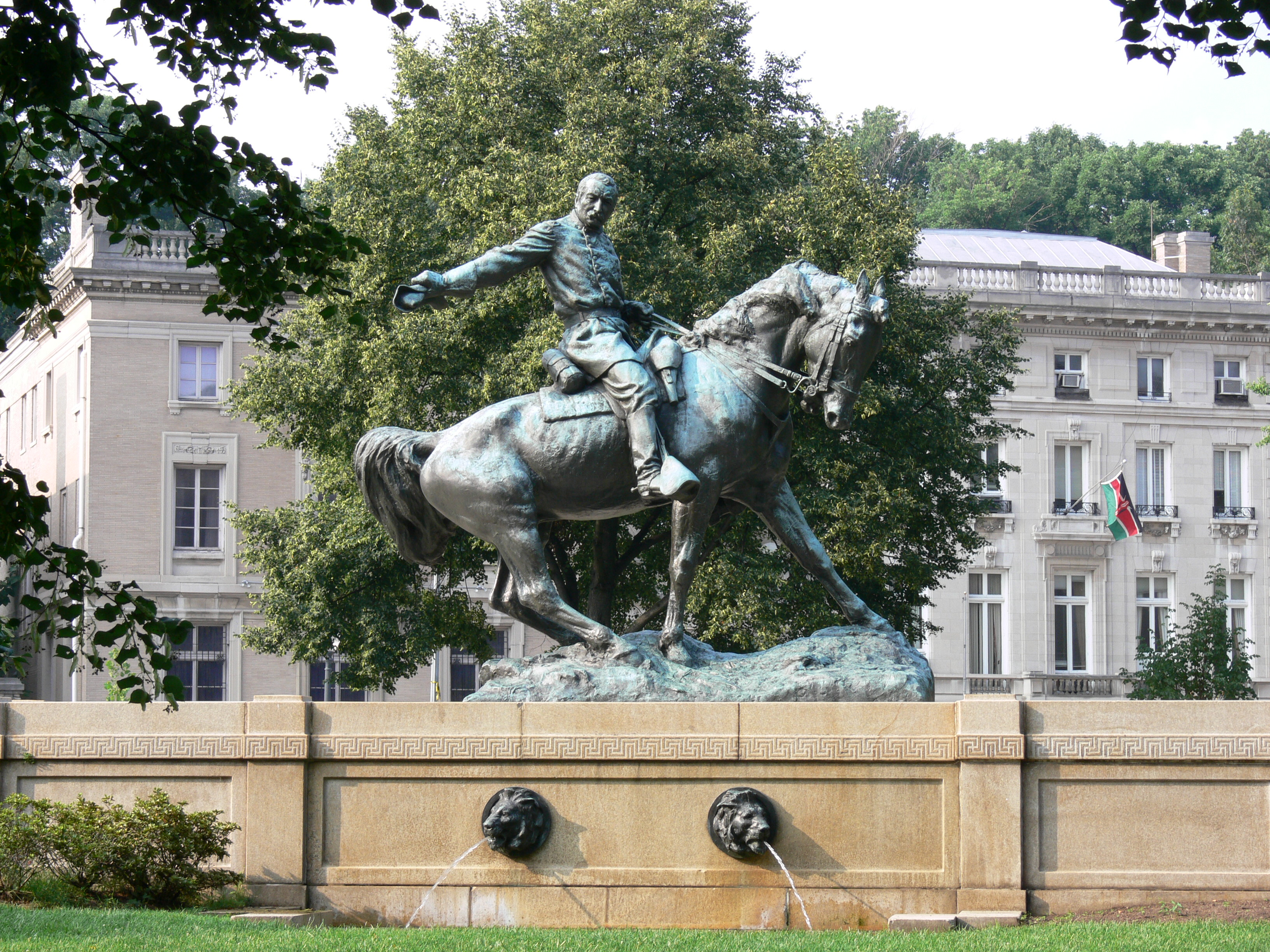
Sheridan

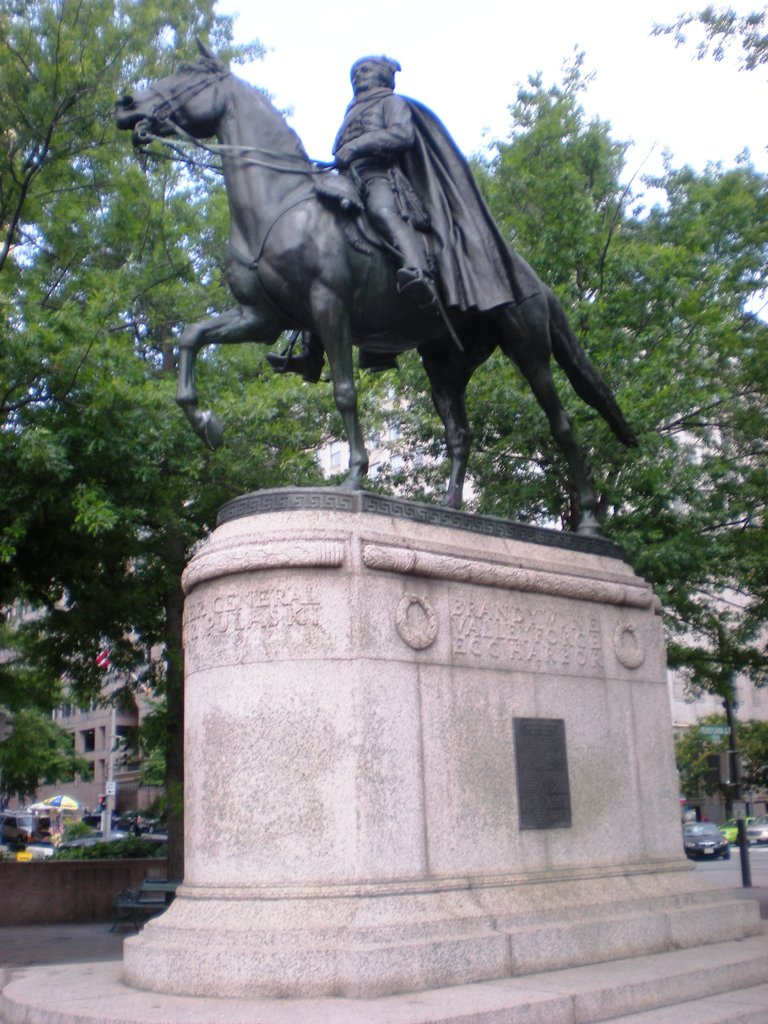
Pulaski

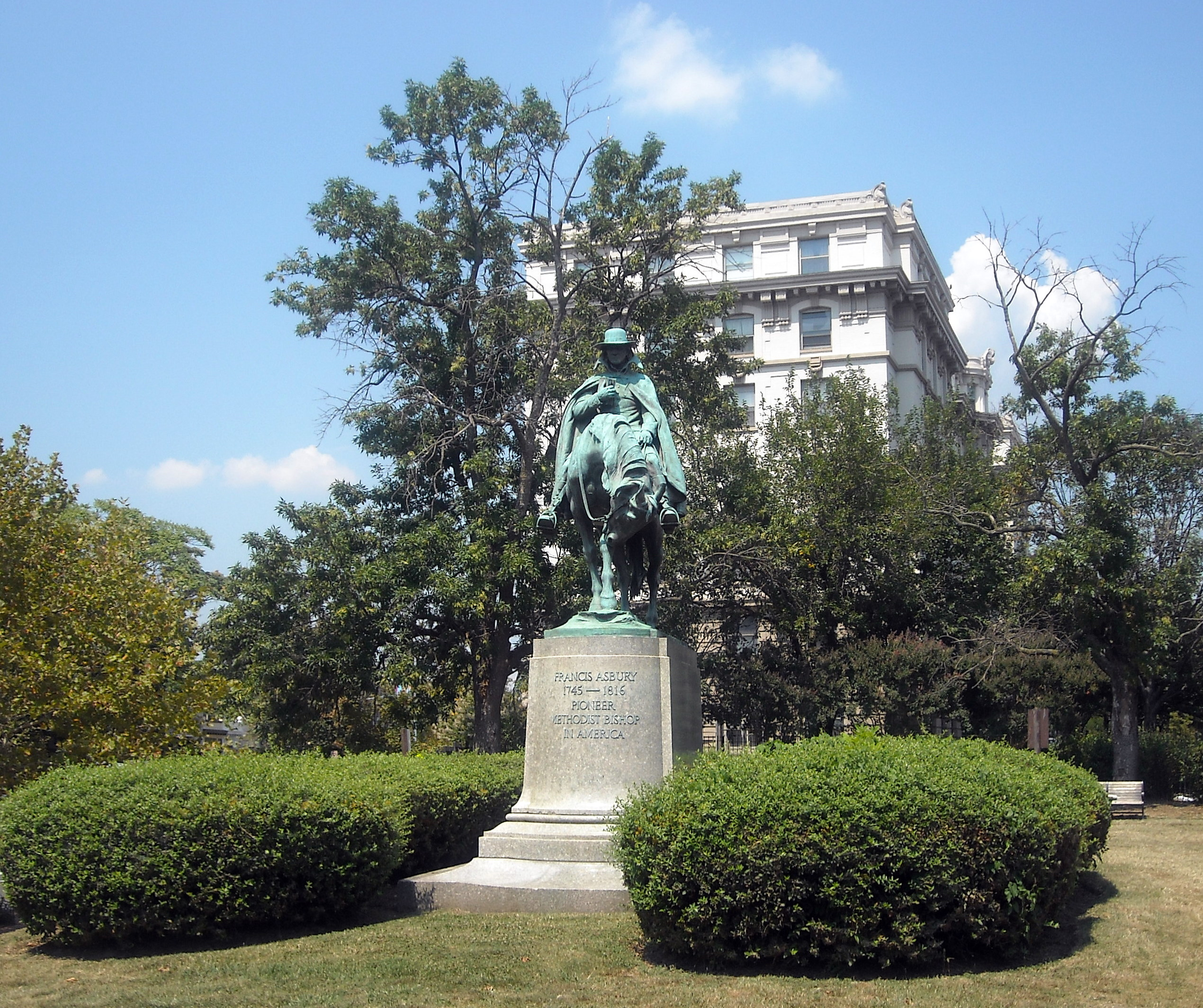
Asbury

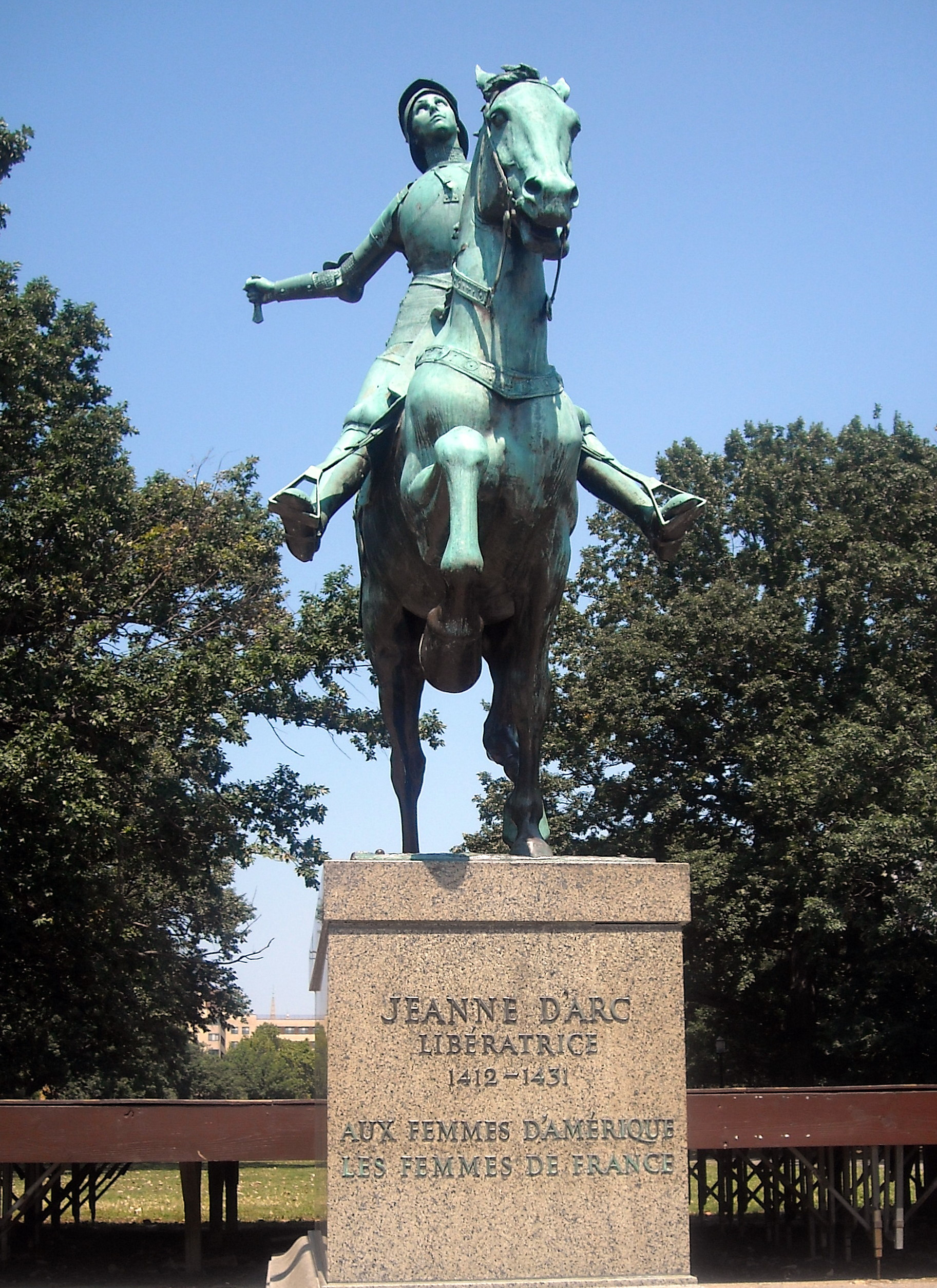
Joan of Arc

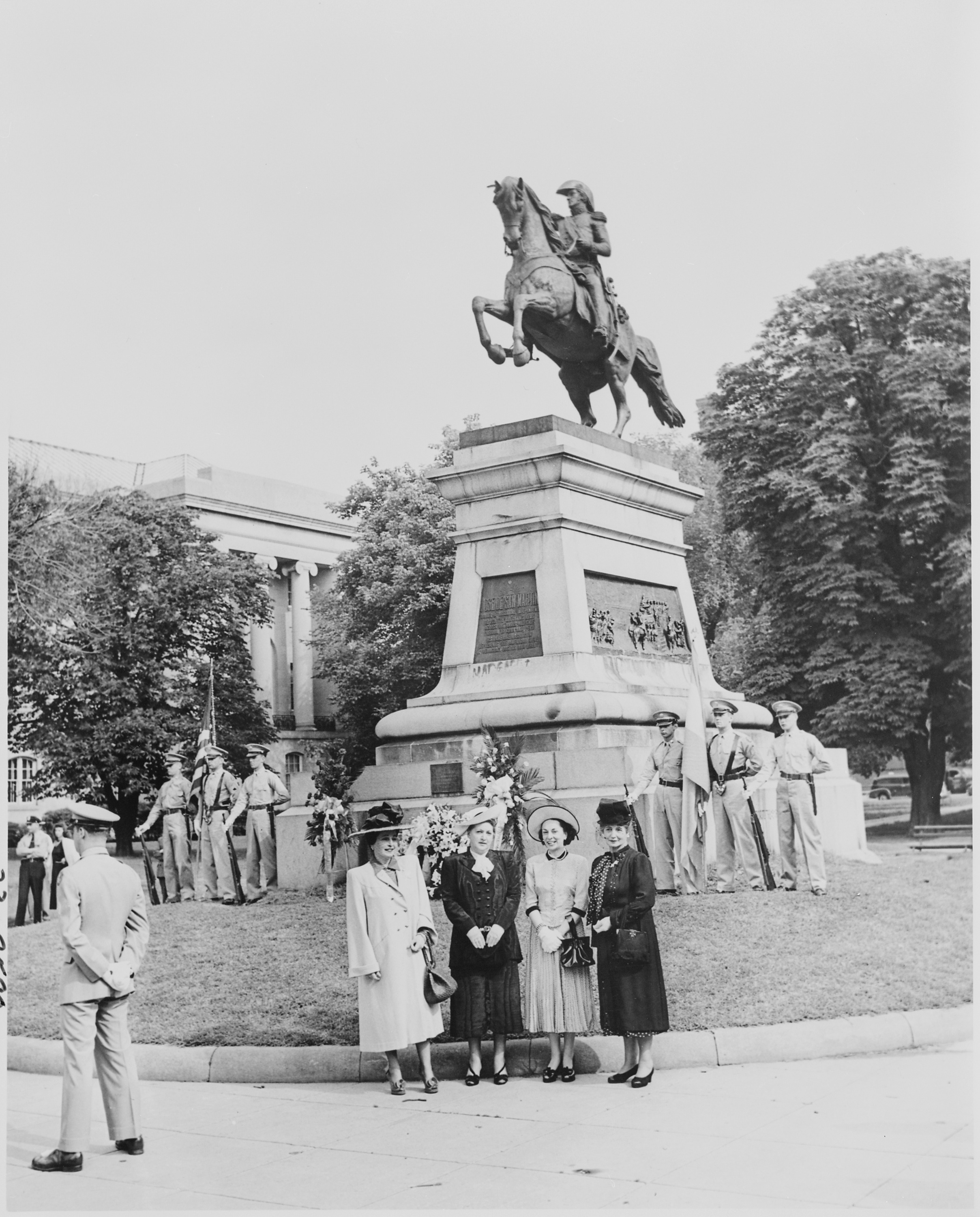
de San Martin

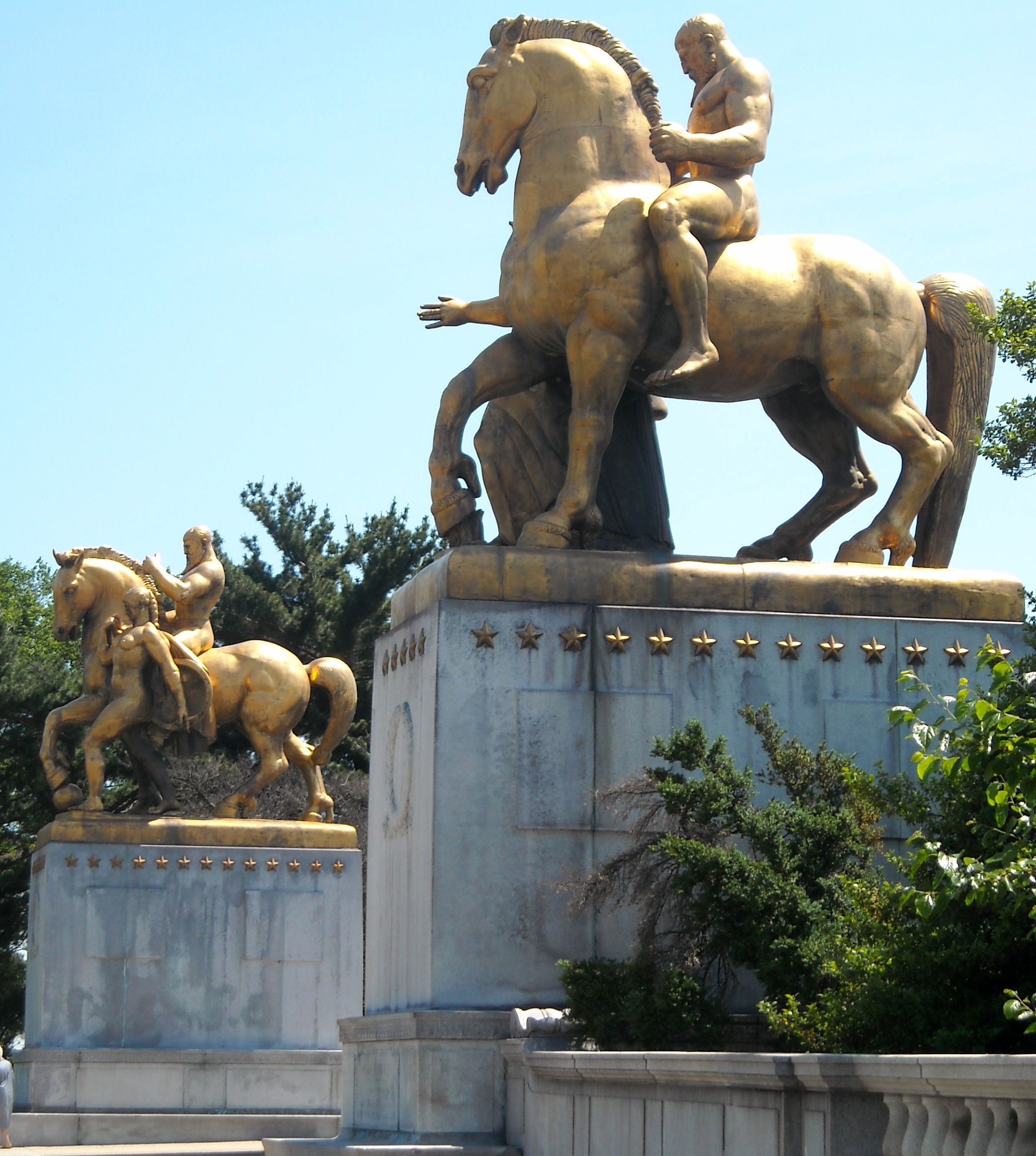
Valor (left) and Sacrifice

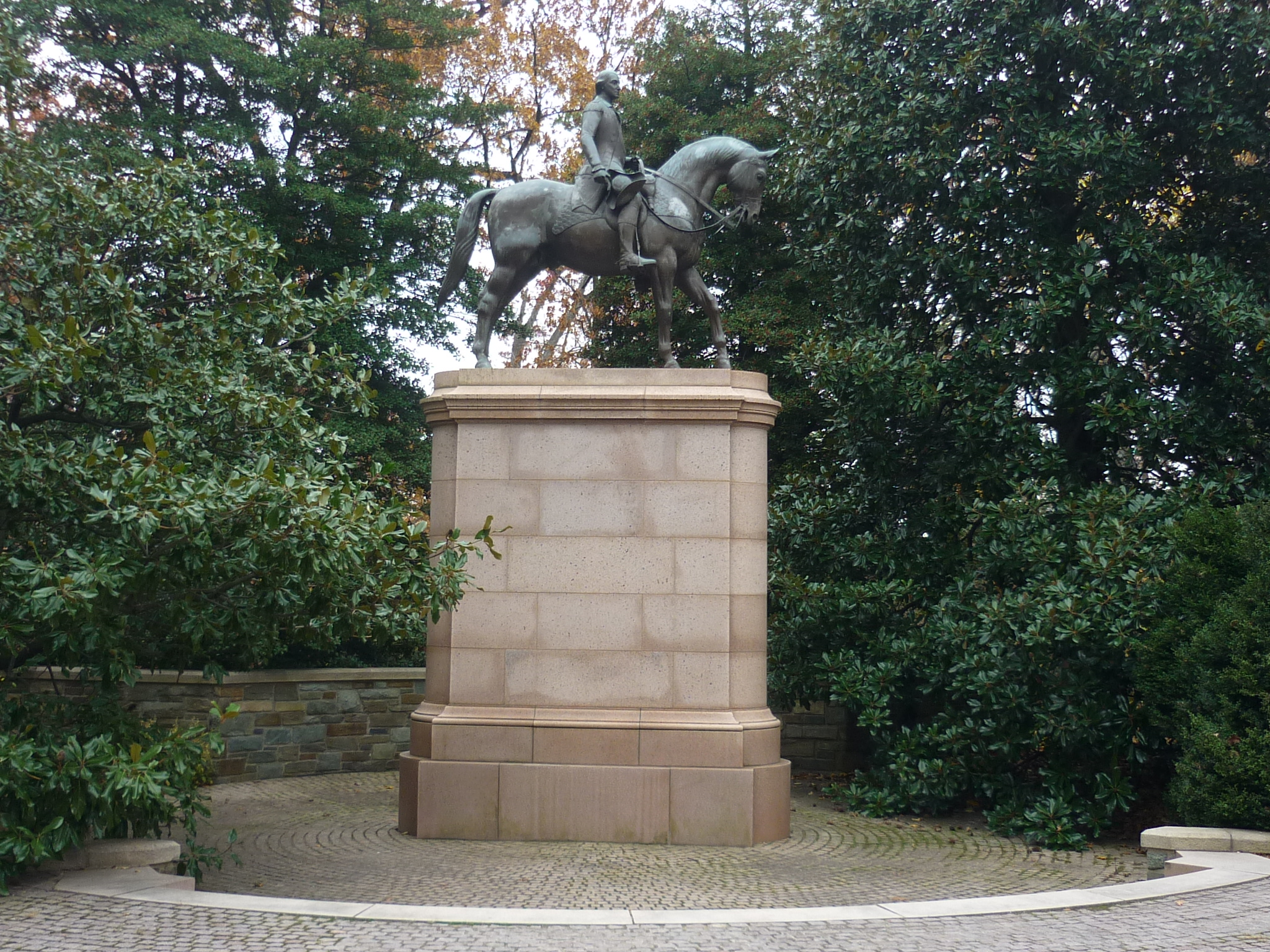
Washington by Haseltine

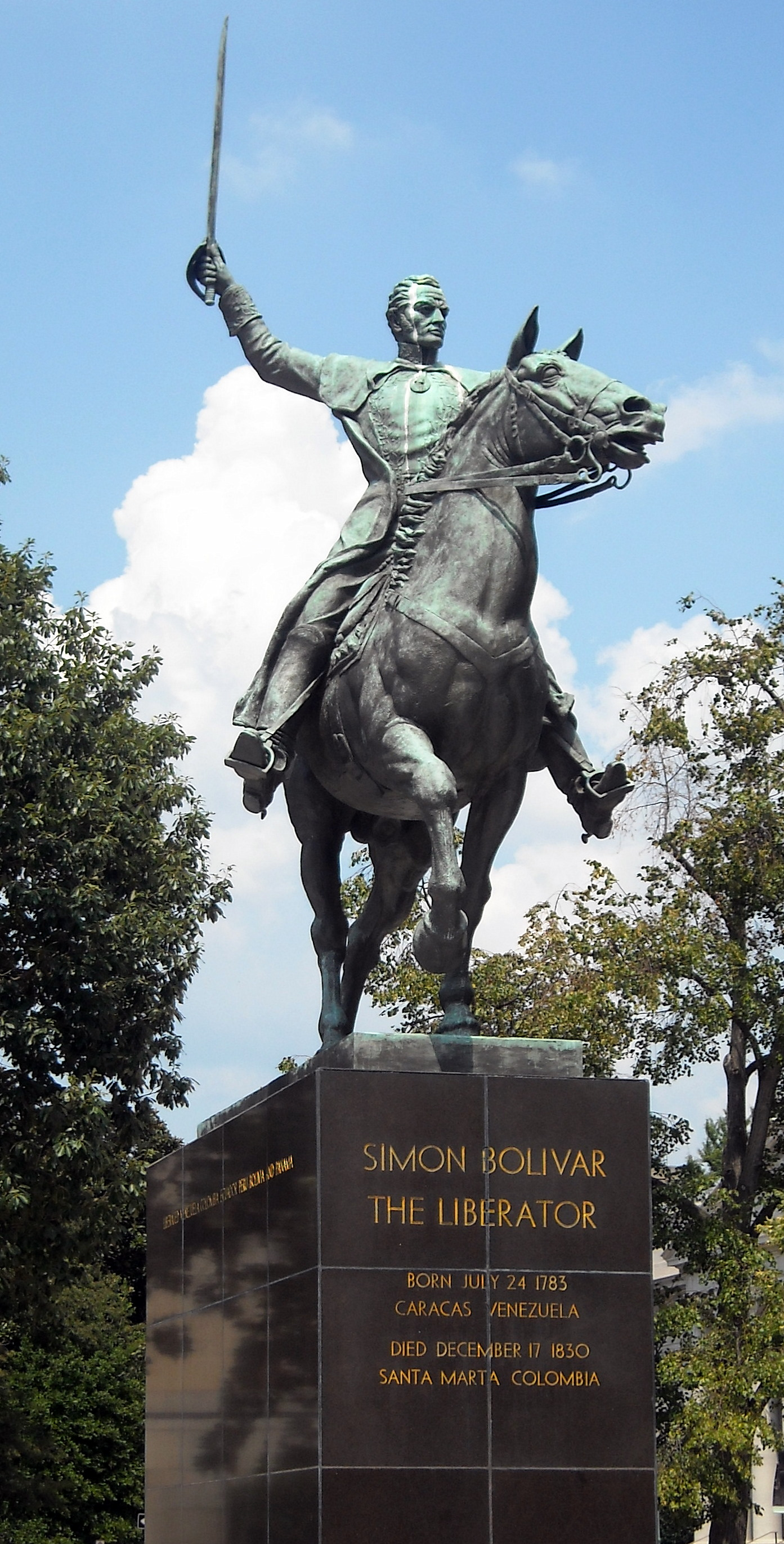
Bolívar by de Weldon

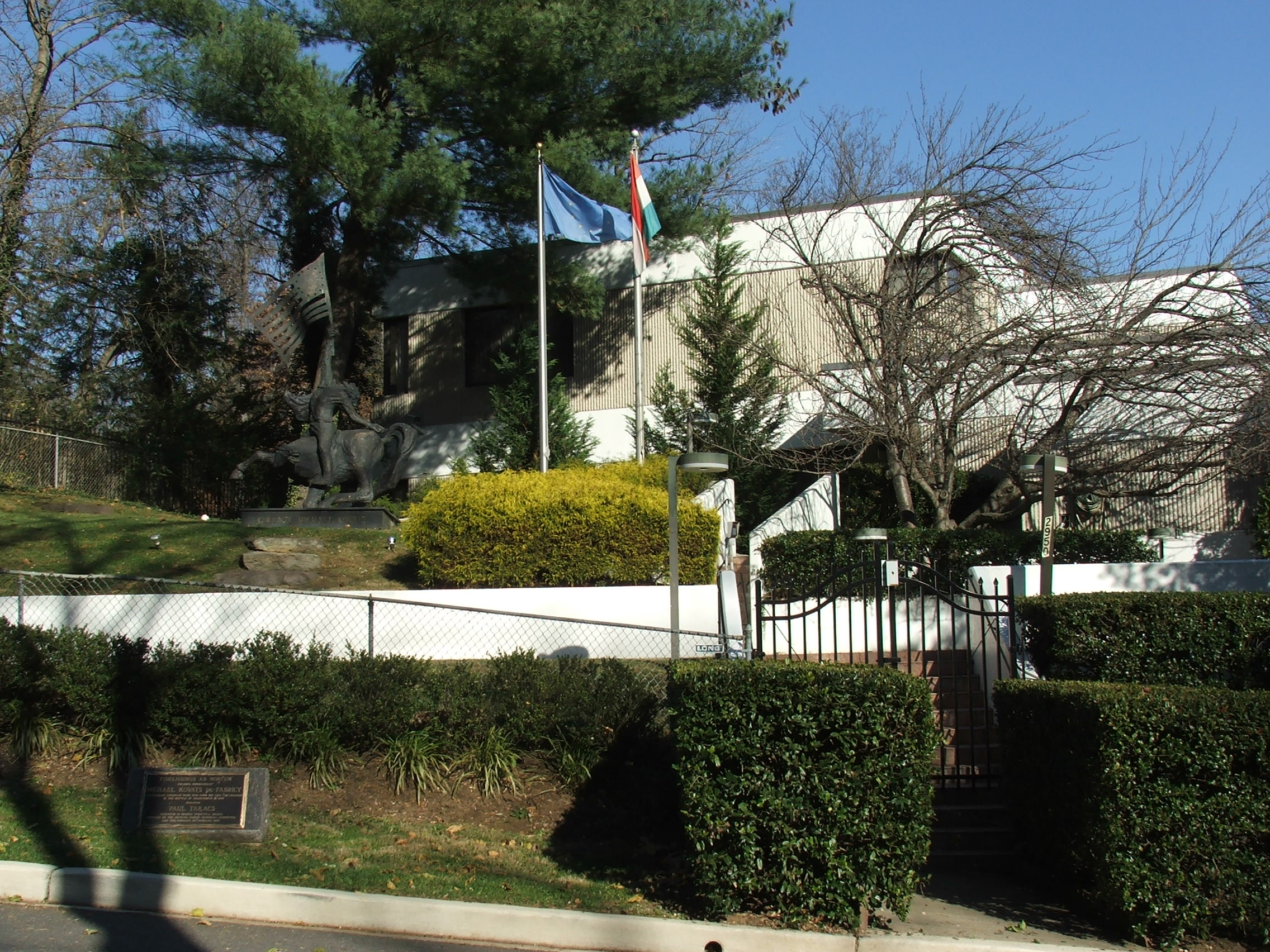
Kovats de Fabriczy

=== Florida ===
- Jacksonville
  - General Andrew Jackson Reviewing the Troops, by Bob Springer, Jacksonville Landing, 1987. A copy after Clark Mills's 1853 statue in Washington, DC.
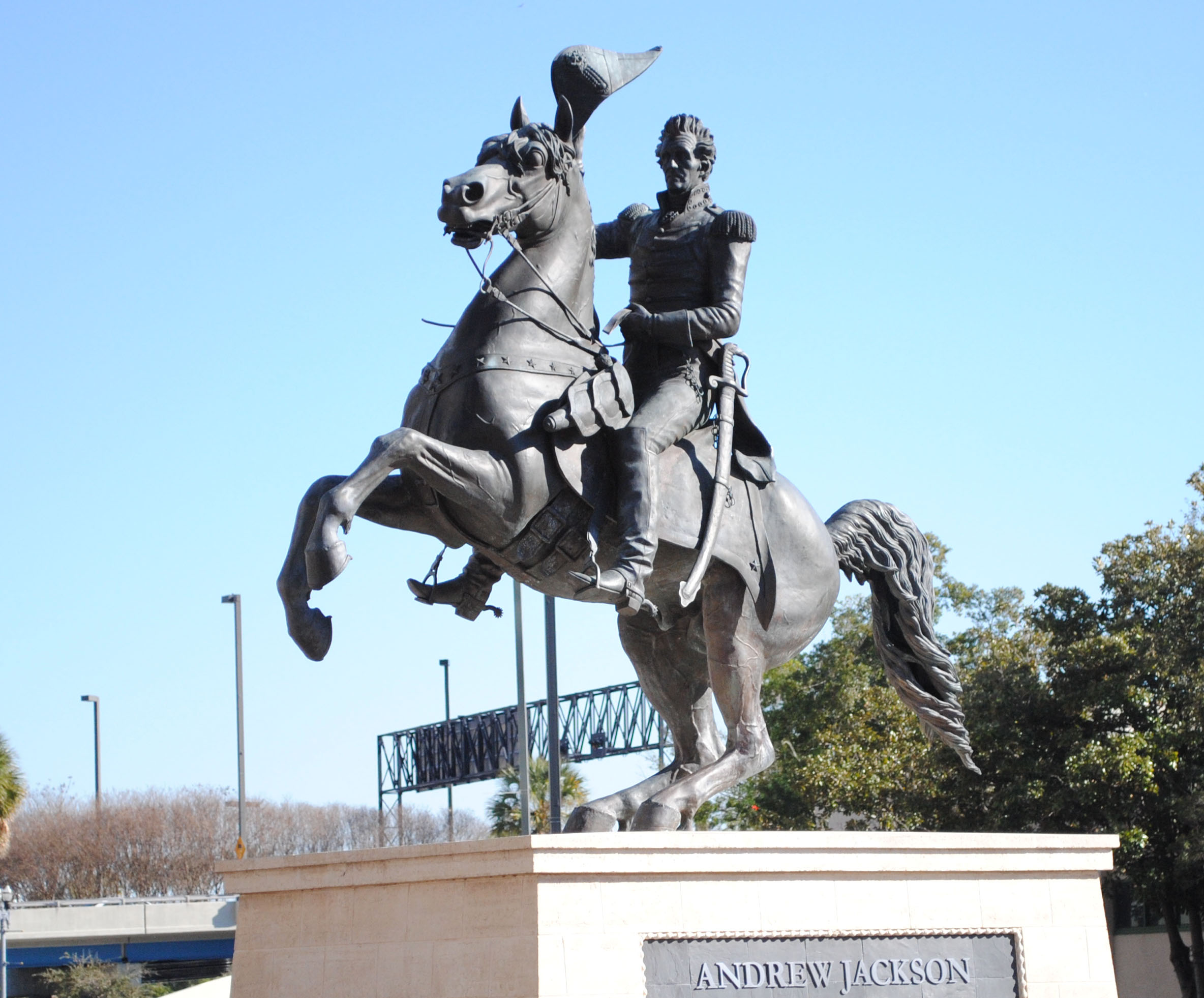
Jackson
- Miami Beach
  - End of the Trail (The Great Spirit), by Ettore Pellegatta, Pinetree & Flamingo Drives, 1923–24.
- Pine Island Ridge
  - Major William Lauderdale, by Luis Montoya, Pine Island Road, 1988.
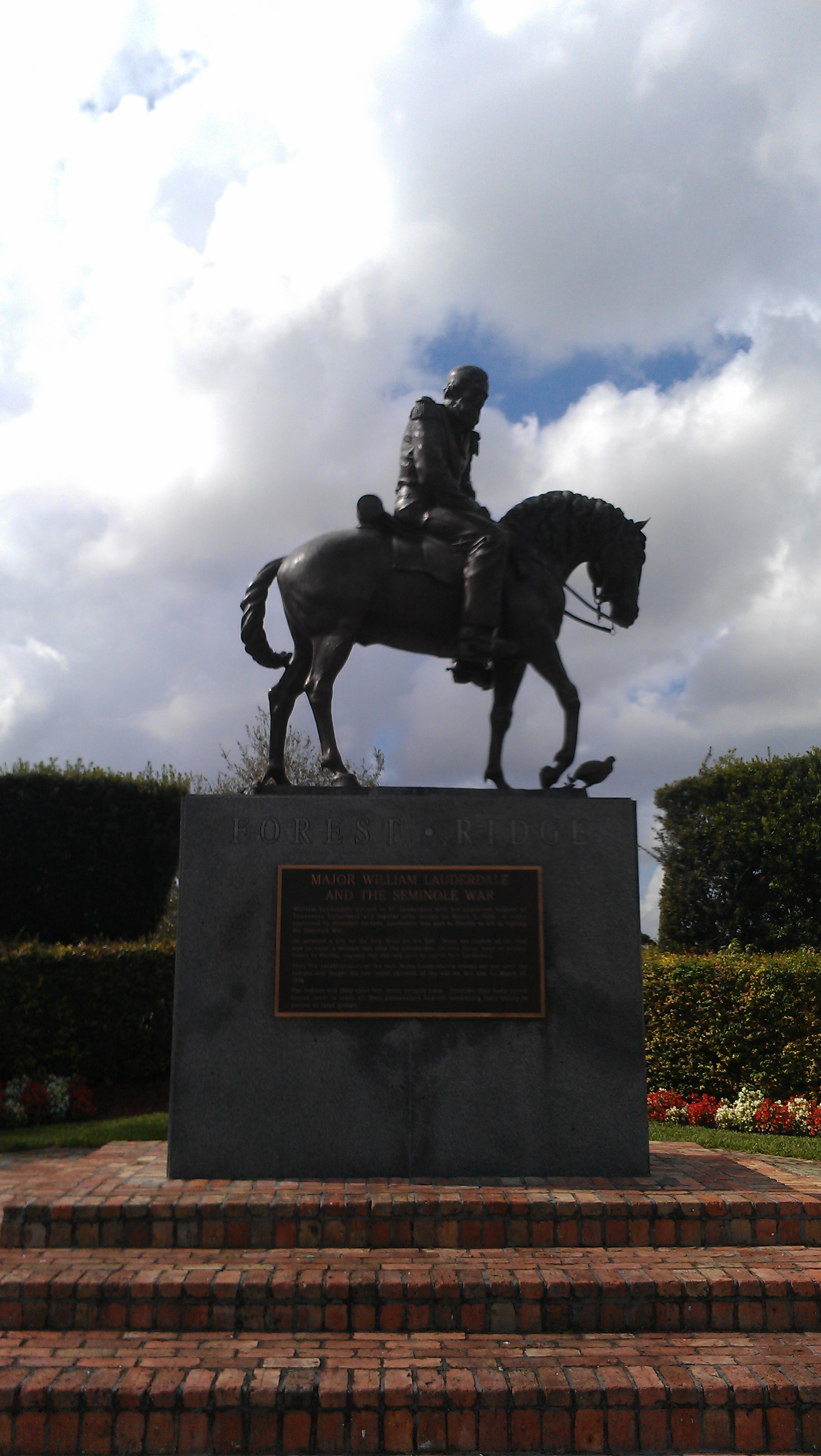
Lauderdale

=== Georgia ===
- Atlanta
  - General John Brown Gordon, by Solon Borglum, Georgia State Capitol, 1907.
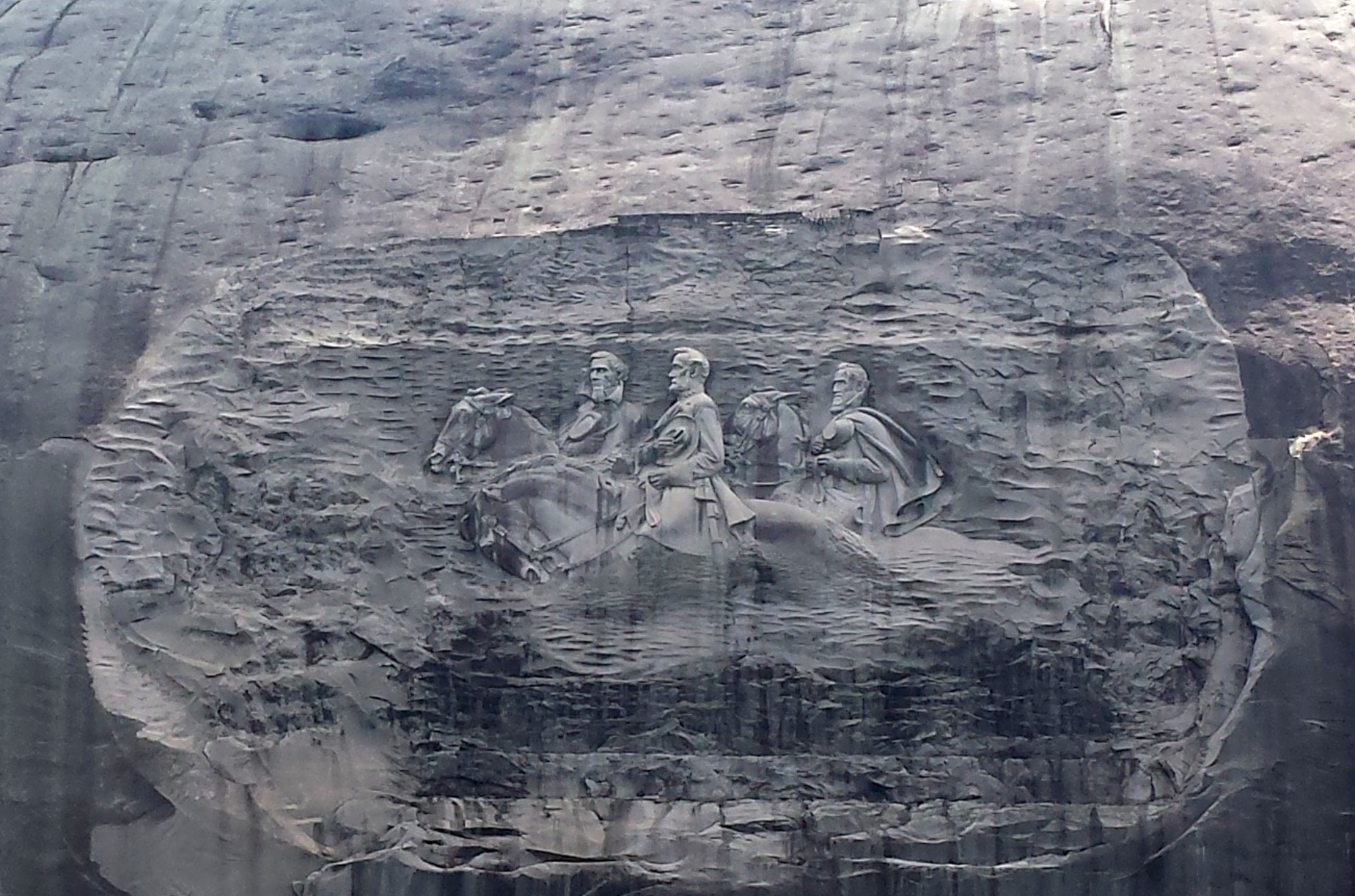
- Stone Mountain
  - Confederate Memorial Carving, by Gutzon Borglum (1916–23), Augustus Lukeman (1923–28); Walker Hancock and Roy Faulkner (1963–72); Stone Mountain Memorial Park, completed 1972. The carving depicts Jefferson Davis, Robert E. Lee and Stonewall Jackson on horseback. It is about 90 feet (26 m) tall and 190 feet (58 m) wide.
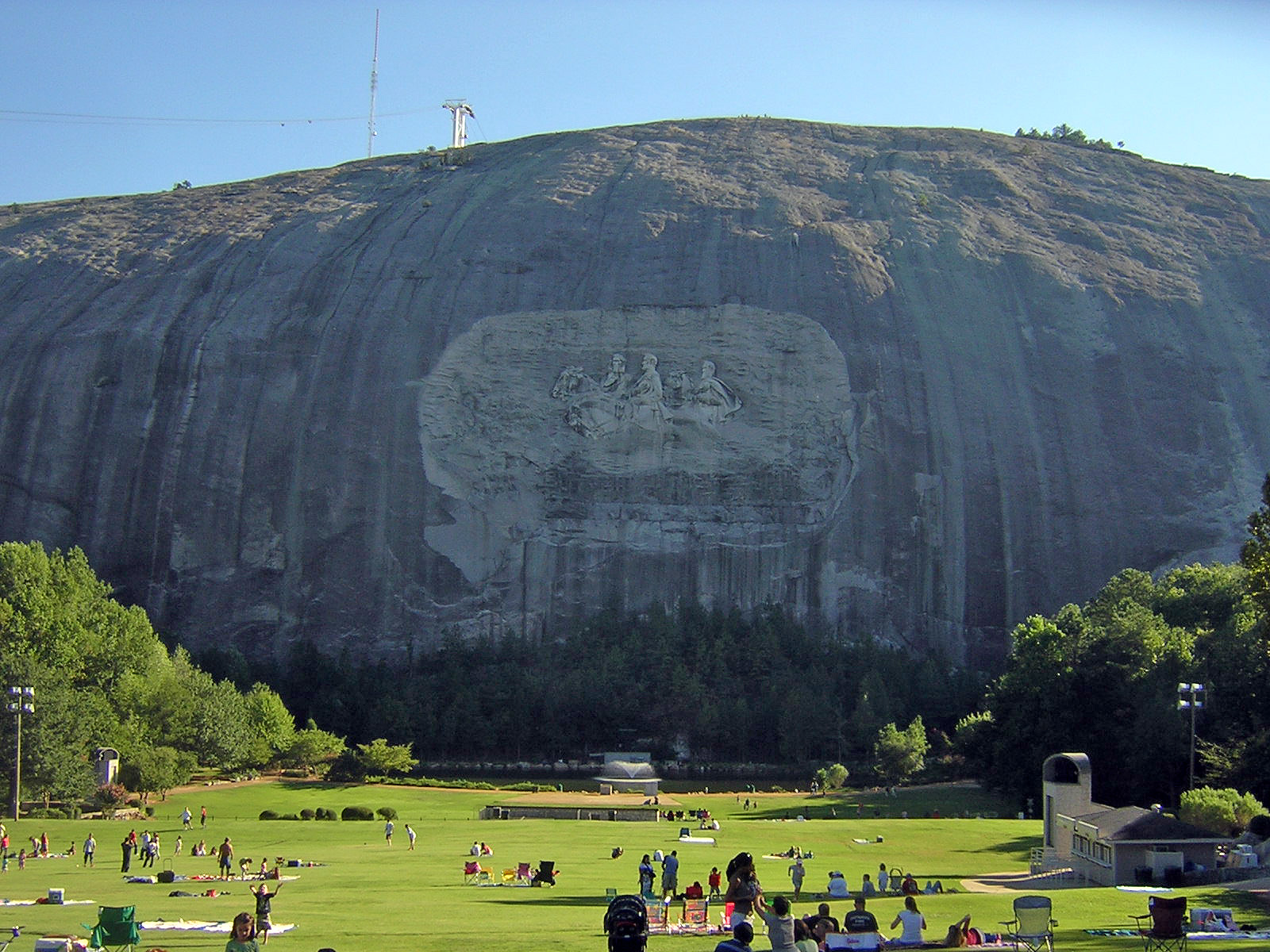
Confederate Memorial

=== Idaho ===
- Kellogg
  - St. George and the Dragon, by David Ray Dose, Hill Street, 1988.
- Lewiston
  - Indian Summer 1974, by Don D. Joslyn, Nez Perce County Courthouse, 1974.
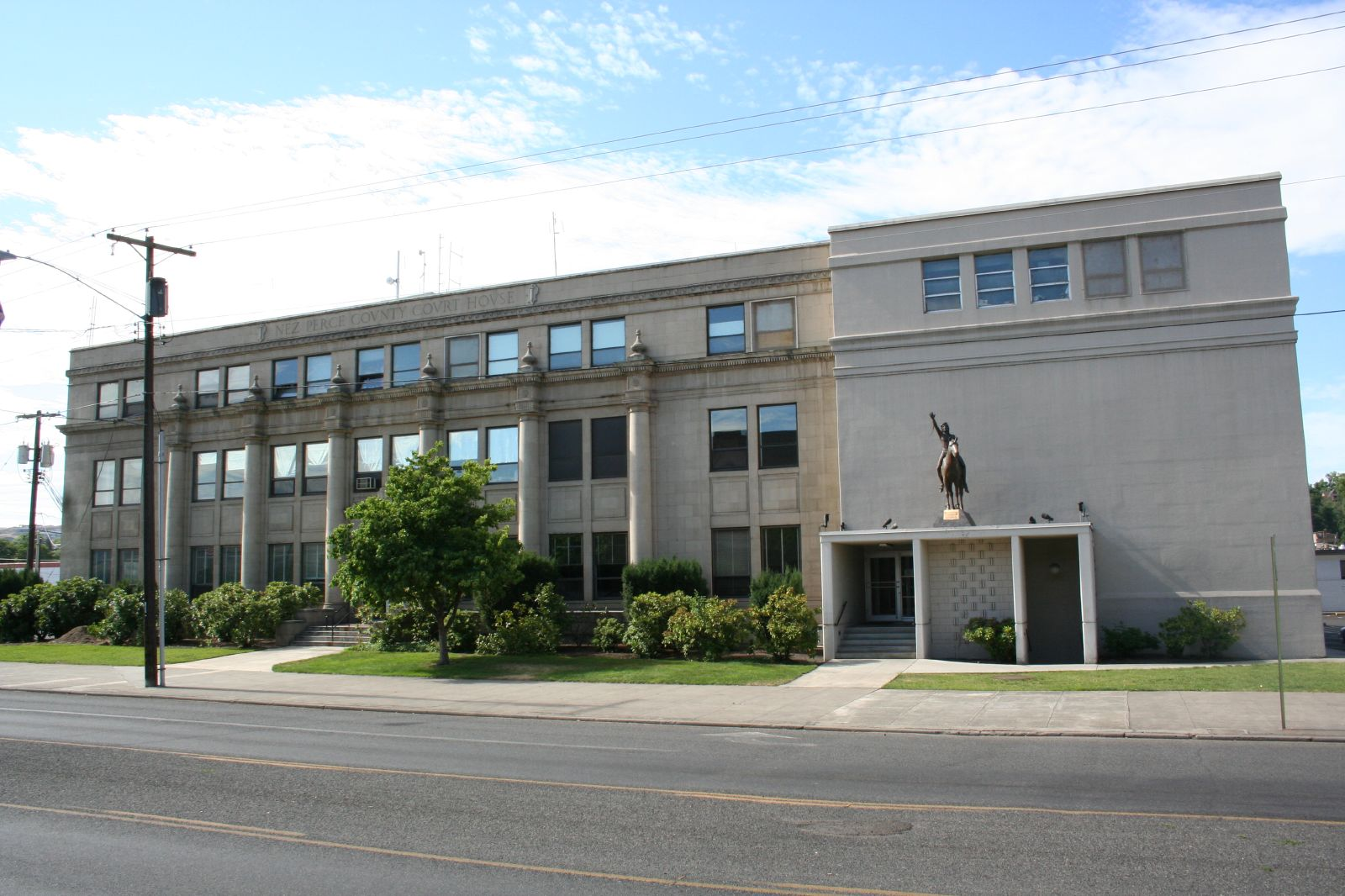
Indian Summer 1974

=== Illinois ===
- Chicago
  - General Ulysses S. Grant, by Louis Rebisso, Lincoln Park, 1891.
  - Signal of Peace, by Cyrus Dallin, Lincoln Park, 1894.
  - General John A. Logan, by Augustus Saint-Gaudens (Logan) and Alexander Phimister Proctor (horse), Grant Park (Chicago), 1897.
  - Thaddeus Kosciuszko, by Kasmir Chodzinski, Burnham Park (Chicago), 1904.
  - George Washington, by Daniel Chester French (Washington) and Edward Clark Potter (horse), Washington Park, 1900, this cast 1903. A replica of French & Potter's statue at the Place d'Iéna in Paris, France.
  - Fountain of Time, by Lorado Taft, Washington Park (Chicago park), 1920–22.
  - General Philip Sheridan, by Gutzon Borglum, Lake Shore Drive at Belmont Avenue, 1923.
  - The Pioneers, by James Earle Fraser, northwest pylon, Michigan Avenue Bridge, 1928.
  - The Bowman and the Spearman, two statues by Ivan Meštrović, Congress Plaza, 1928.
  - Thomas Masaryk Memorial, by Albin Polasek, Hyde Park, Chicago, 1941.
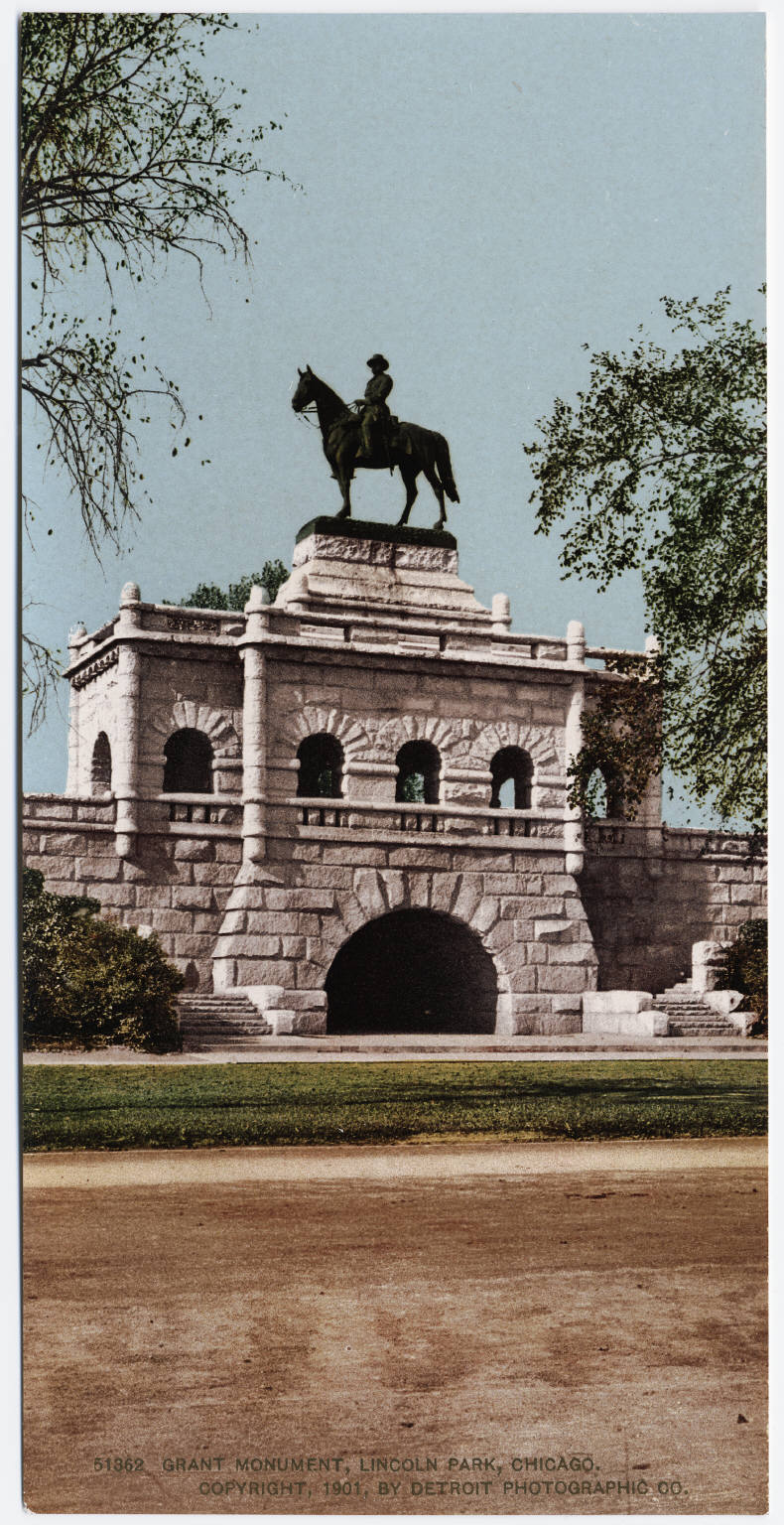
Grant

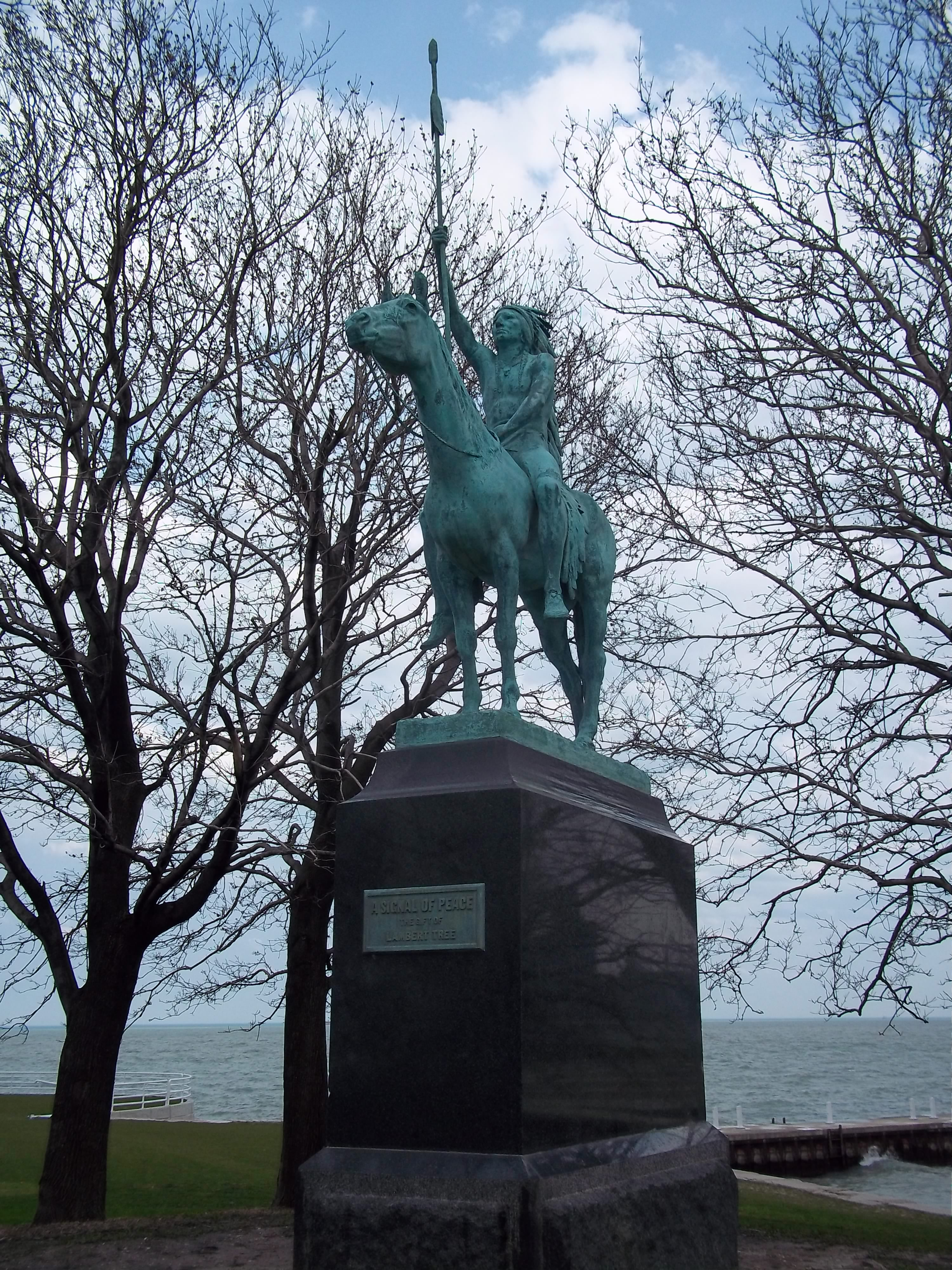
Signal of Peace

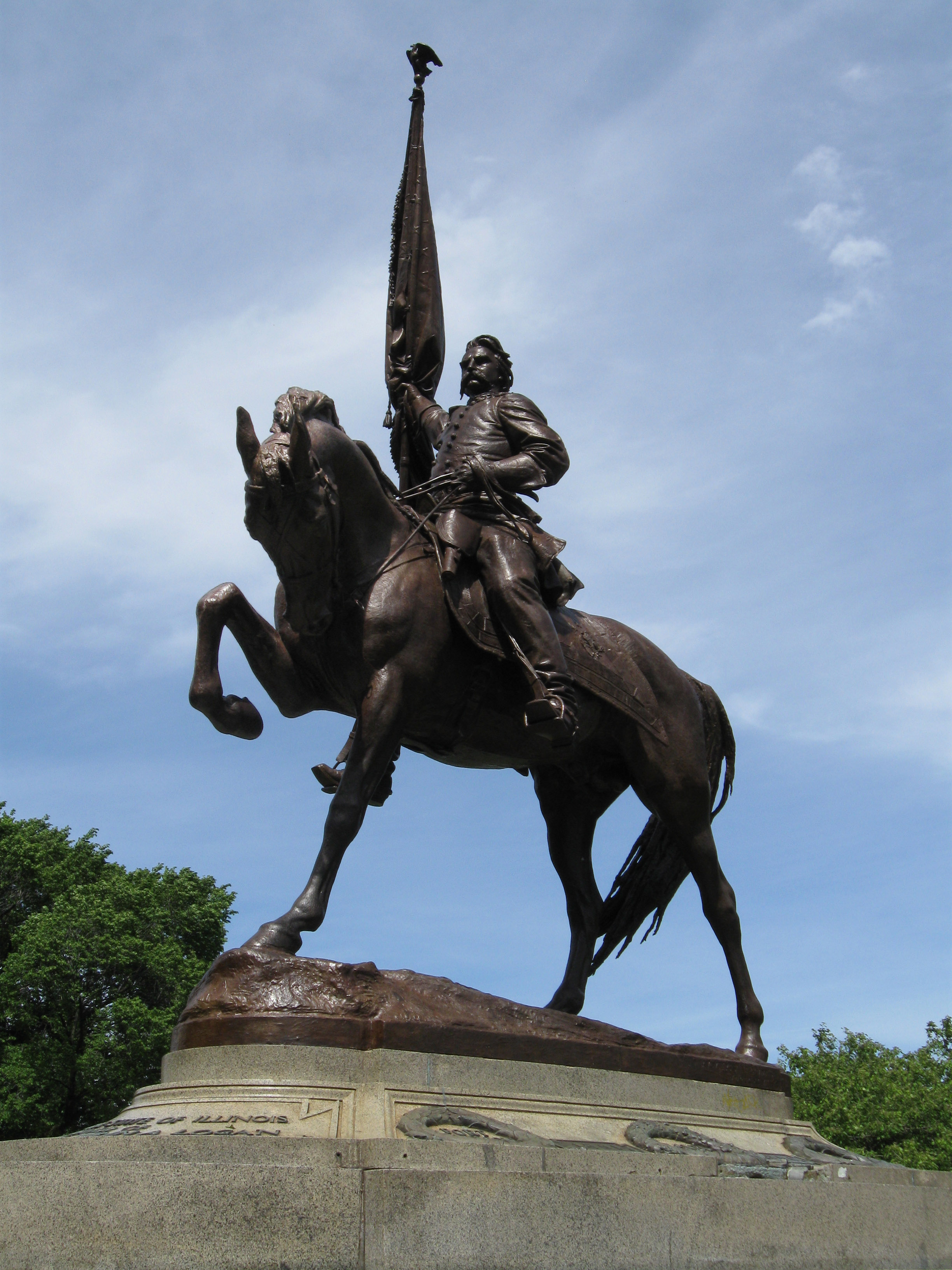
Logan

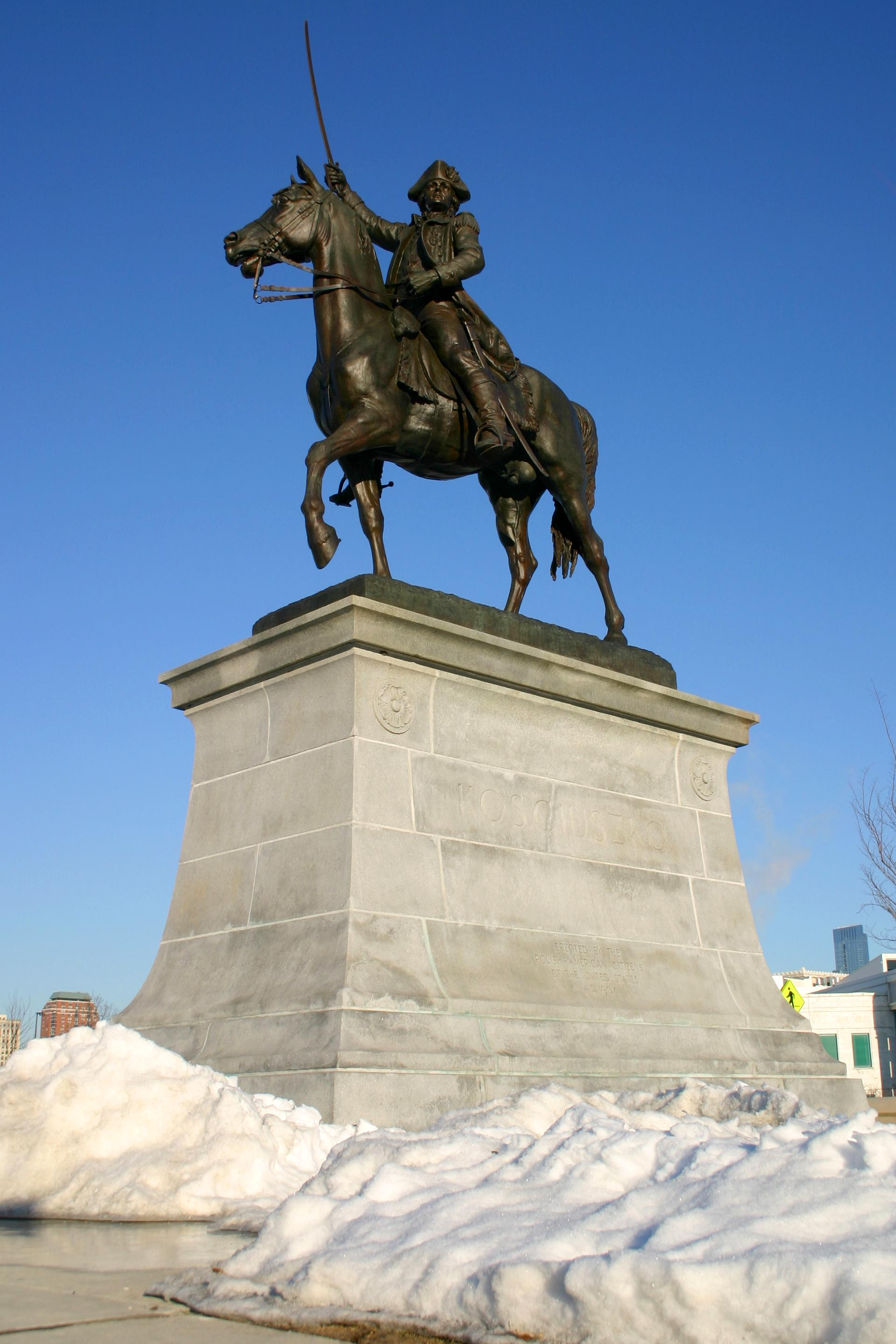
Kosciuszko

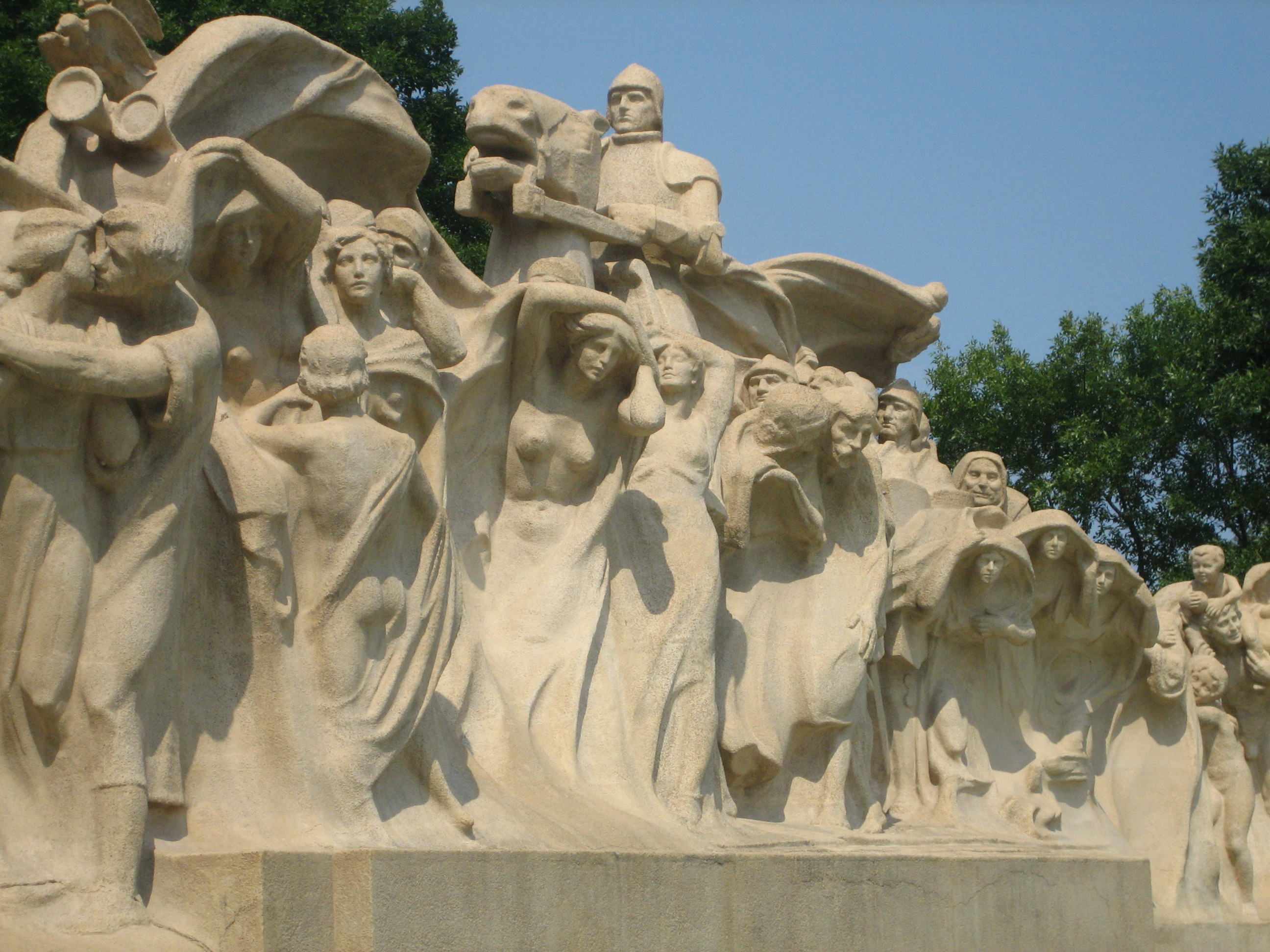
Fountain of Time

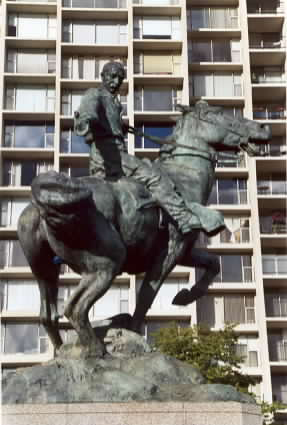
Sheridan

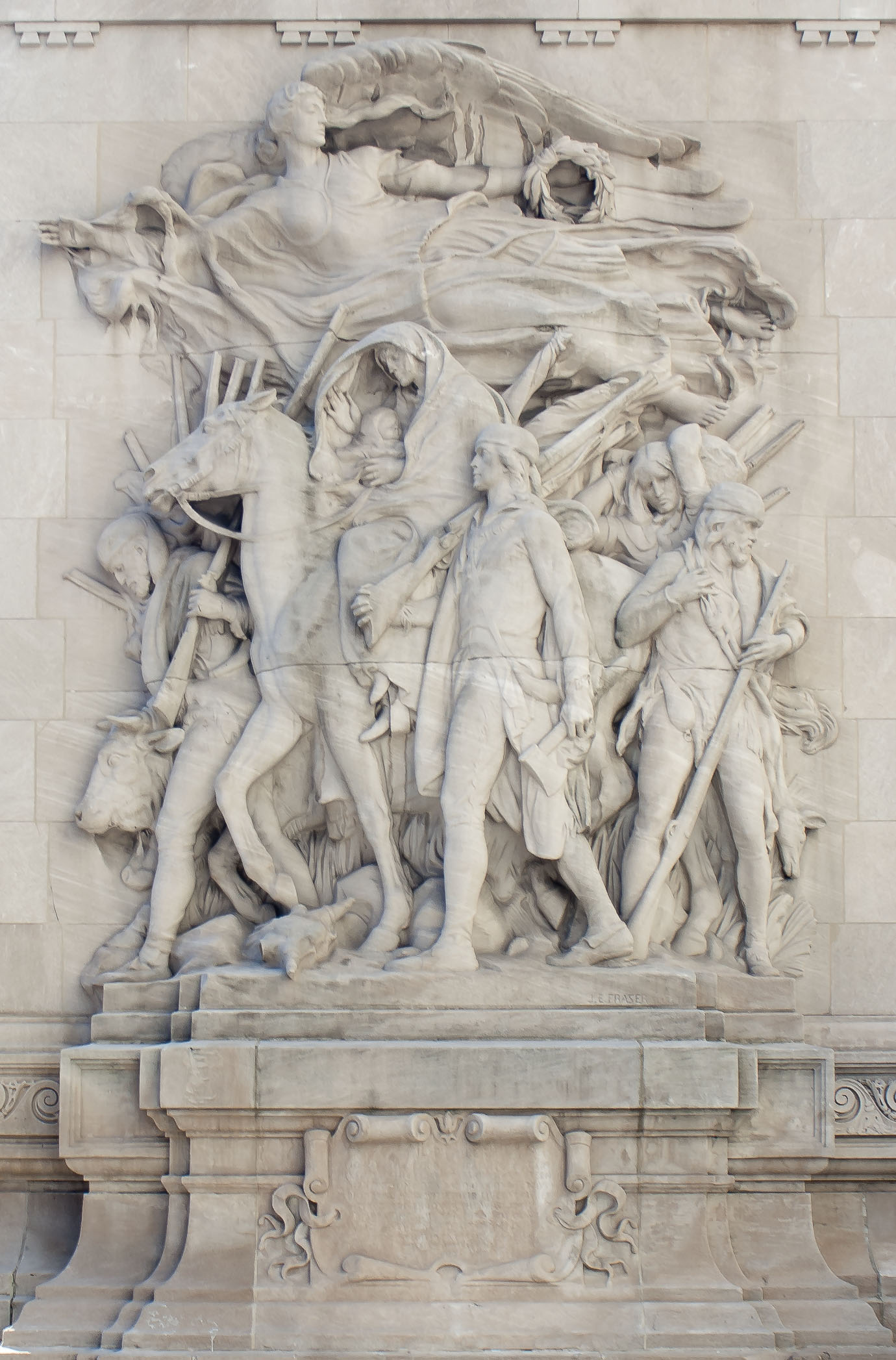
The Pioneers

Bowman

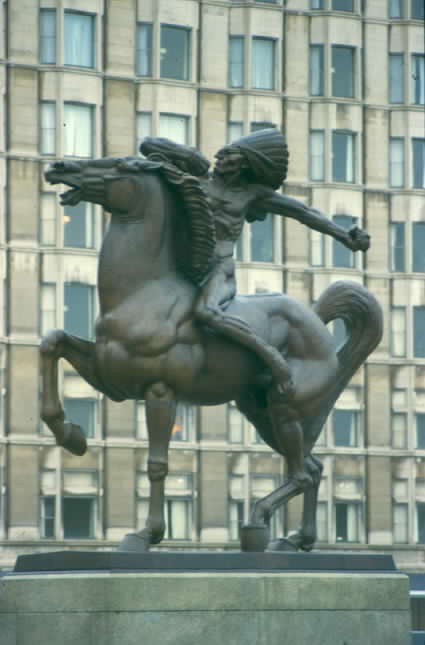
Spearman

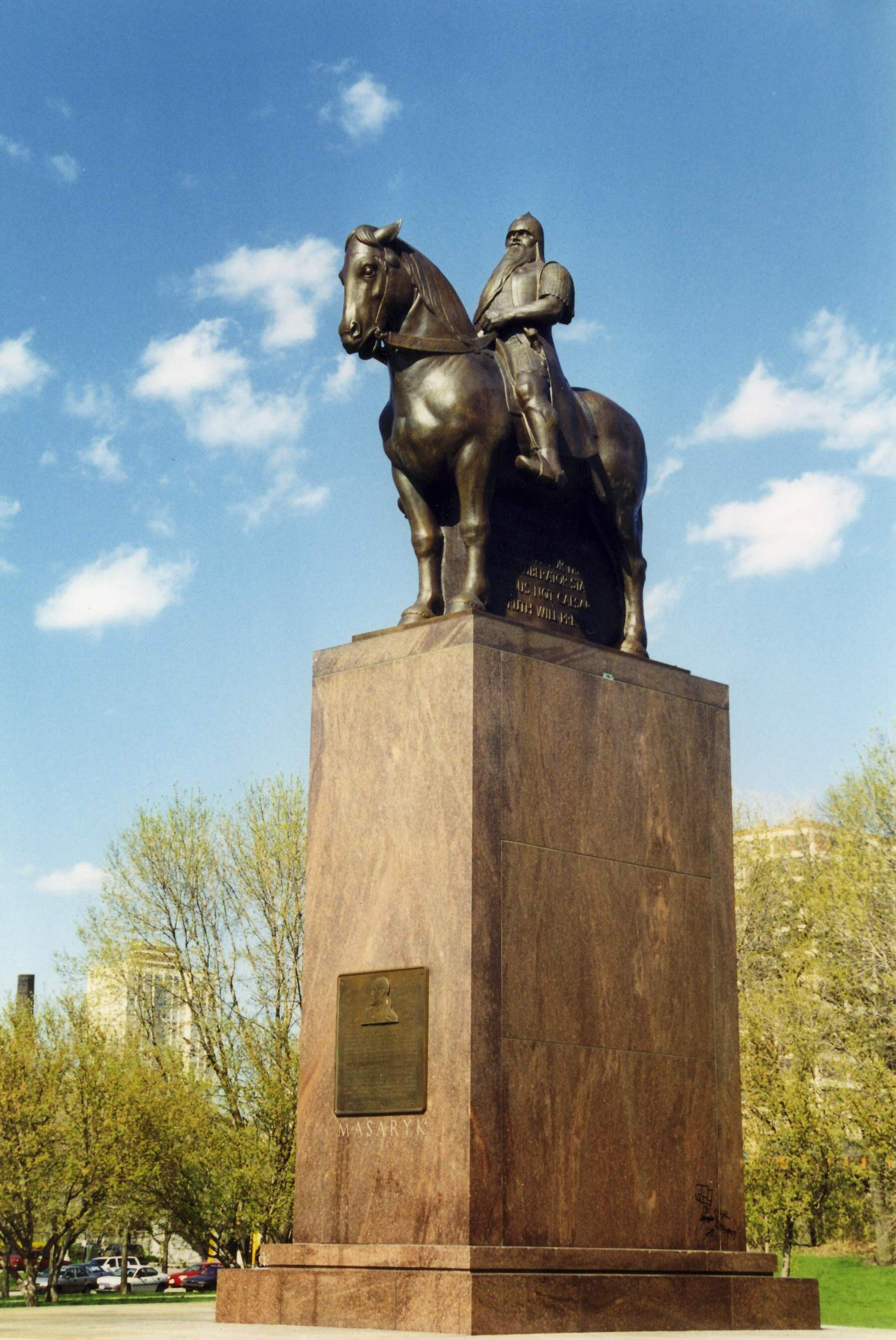
Masaryk
- Petersburg
  - Abraham Lincoln on the Prairie (Young Abe Lincoln), by Anna Hyatt Huntington, New Salem State Historic Site, 1961, this cast ca. 1963–64.
- St. Charles
  - Fox Chase, by Clemente Spampinato, 1974.
- Springfield
  - Lincoln Tomb: Cavalry Group, by Larkin Goldsmith Mead, 1883.
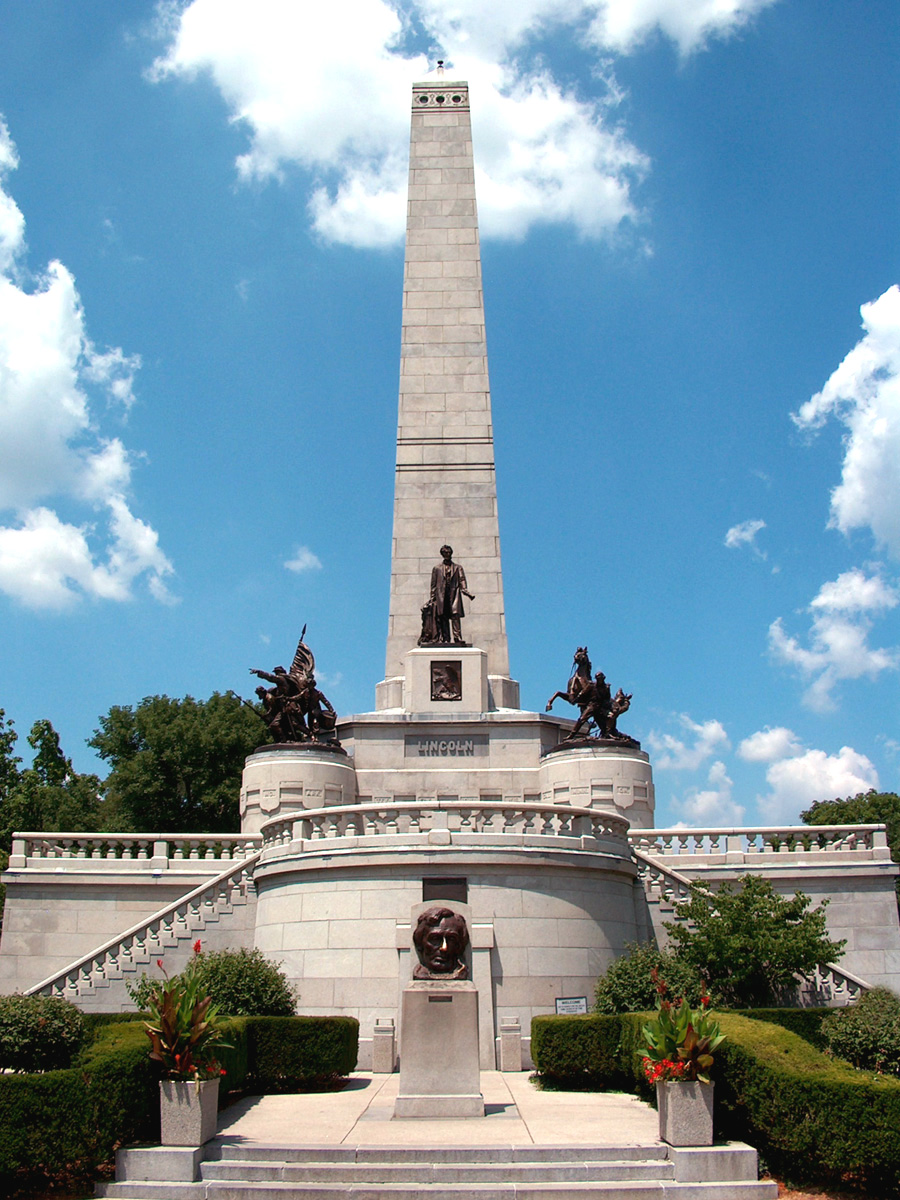
Lincoln Tomb

=== Indiana ===
- Fort Wayne
  - Anthony Wayne Monument, by George Etienne Ganiere, Friedman Square, 1918.
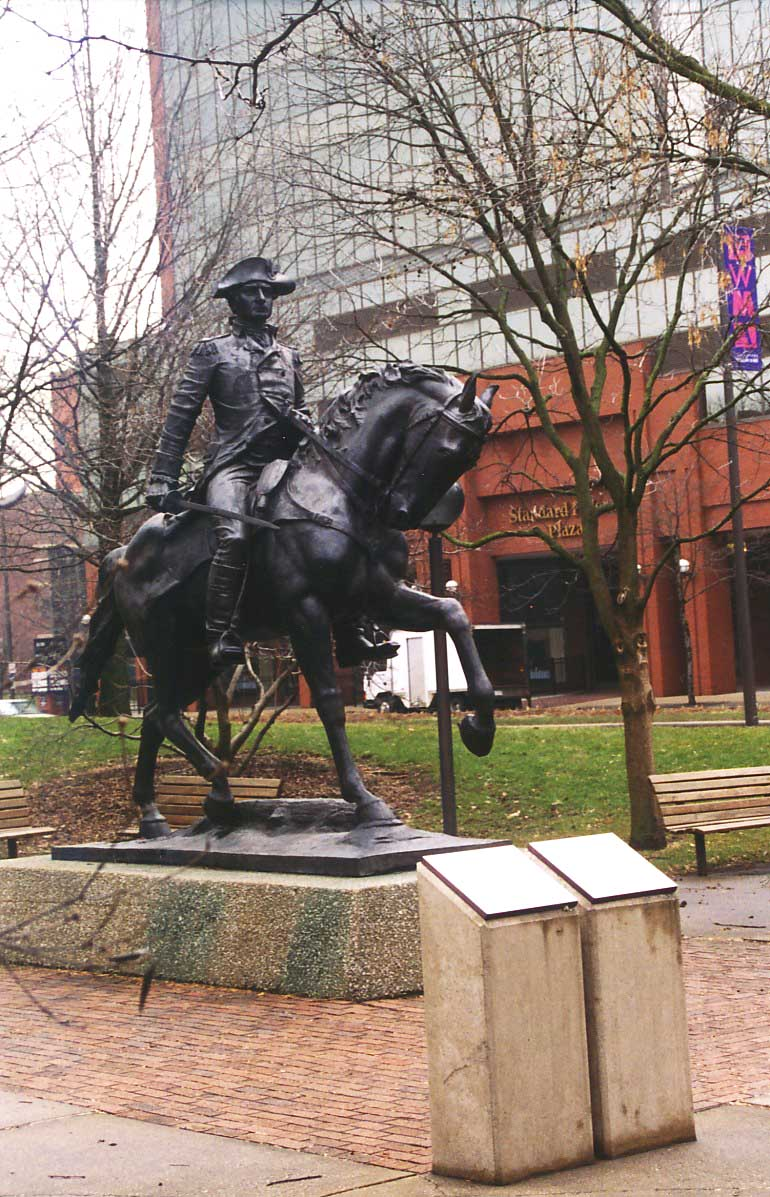
Wayne
- Indianapolis
  - War and Peace, by Rudolf Schwarz, Soldiers' and Sailors' Monument, Monument Circle, 1901
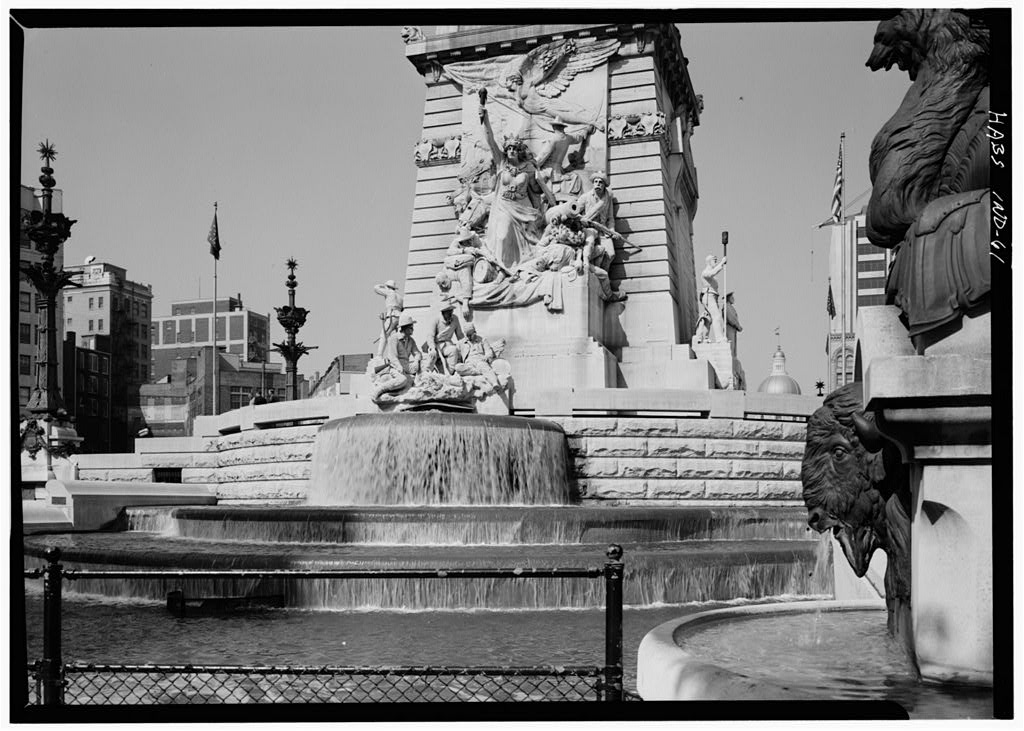
War
- Muncie
  - Appeal to the Great Spirit (smaller version), by Cyrus Edwin Dallin, Walnut & Granville Streets, ca. 1922.

=== Iowa ===
- Burlington
  - General John Murray Corse, by Carl Rohl-Smith, Crapo Park, 1896.
- Des Moines
  - Iowa Soldiers' and Sailors' Monument, by Carl Rohl-Smith, Iowa State Capitol, 1890–96. Four equestrian statues:
    - General Marcellus M. Crocker
    - General John M. Corse
    - General Grenville M. Dodge
    - General Samuel R. Curtis
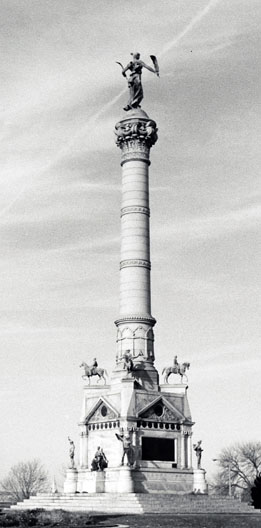
Soldiers' and Sailors' Monument
- Keokuk
  - Samuel Ryan Curtis Memorial, unknown artist, Victory Park, 1898.

=== Kansas ===
- Fort Leavenworth
  - Buffalo Soldier Monument, by Eddie Dixon, 1991–92.
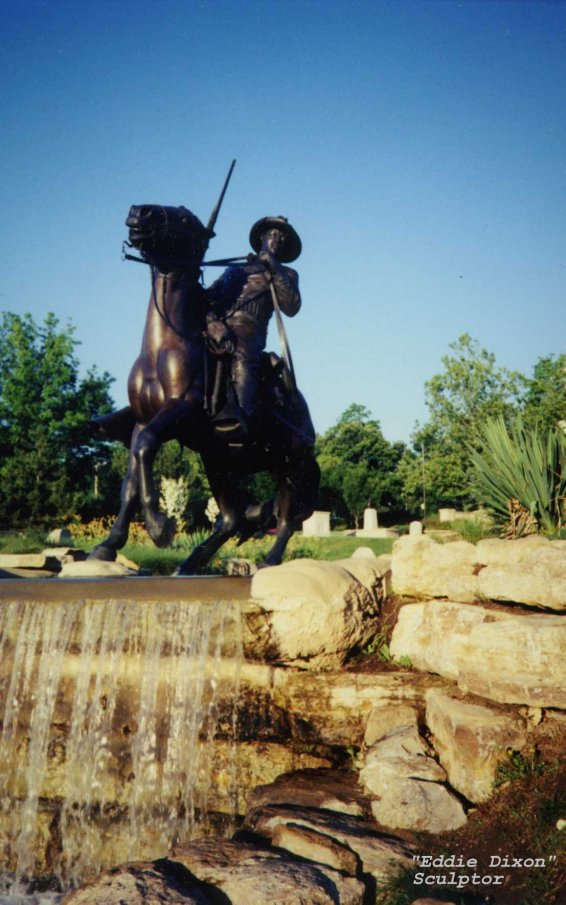
Buffalo Soldier
- McPherson
  - The Reconnoissance (General James B. McPherson), by John Paulding, Memorial Park, McPherson County Courthouse, 1917.
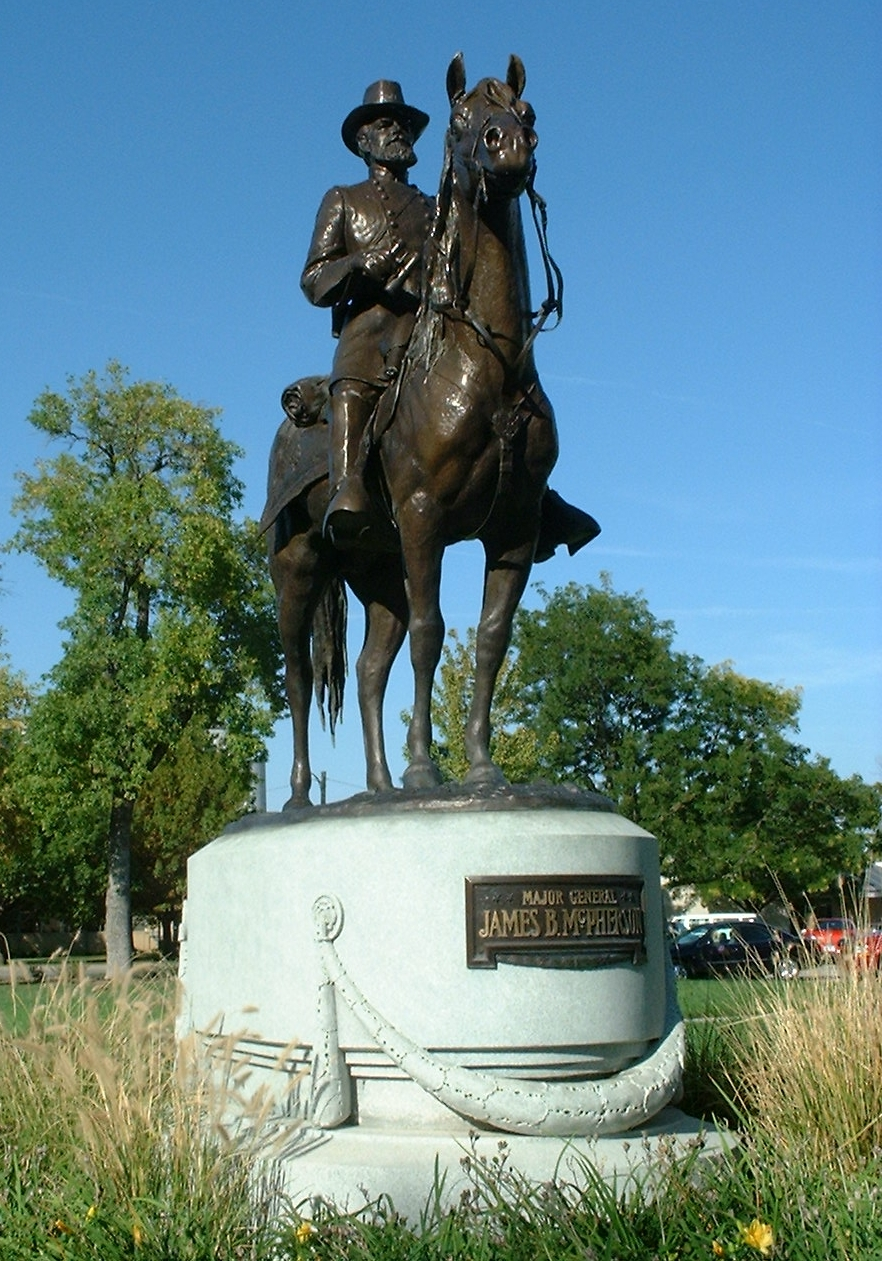
McPherson
- Maryville
  - Pony Express Rider, by Richard Bergen, 1985

=== Kentucky ===
- Lexington
  - John Hunt Morgan Memorial, by Pompeo Coppini, (former) Fayette County Courthouse, 1909–11.
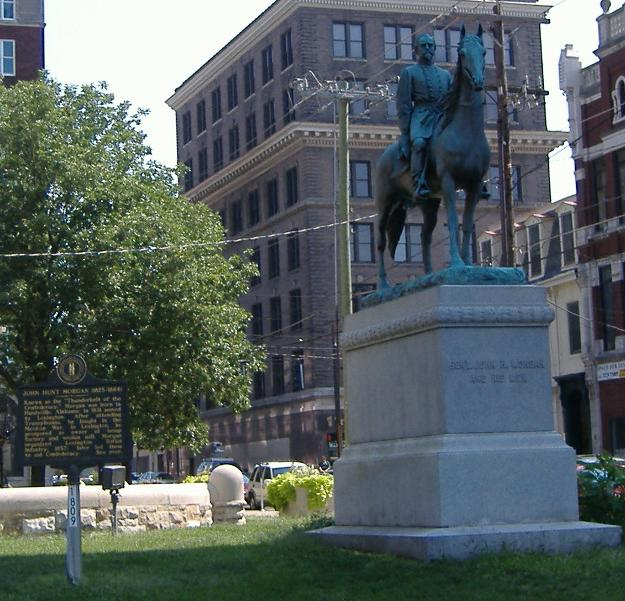
Morgan
- Louisville
  - John B. Castleman Monument, by Roland Hinton Perry, Cherokee Triangle, 1912–14.
  - Bellarmine Knight, by Bob Lockhart, Bellarmine University campus.
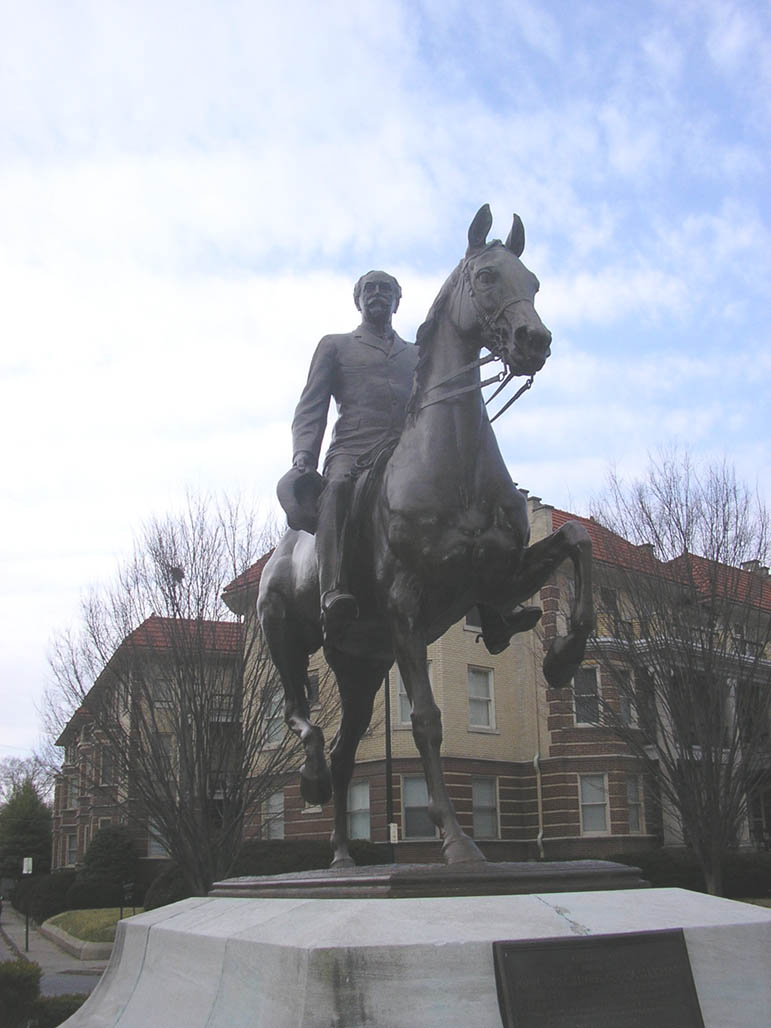
Castleman
- Richmond
  - Equestrian ("Mounted Policeman"), by Felix de Weldon, Eastern Kentucky University College of Law Enforcement, 1975–76.

=== Louisiana ===
- New Orleans
  - Andrew Jackson, by Clark Mills, Jackson Square, 1856.
  - Army of Tennessee – Louisiana Division (Albert Sidney Johnston), by Alexander Doyle, Metairie Cemetery, 1877.
  - P.G.T. Beauregard Monument, by Alexander Doyle, City Park (New Orleans), 1915.
  - Bernardo de Galvez, by Juan de Ávalos, International Trade Mart, 1976–77. A replica of de Ávalos's statue in Washington, DC.
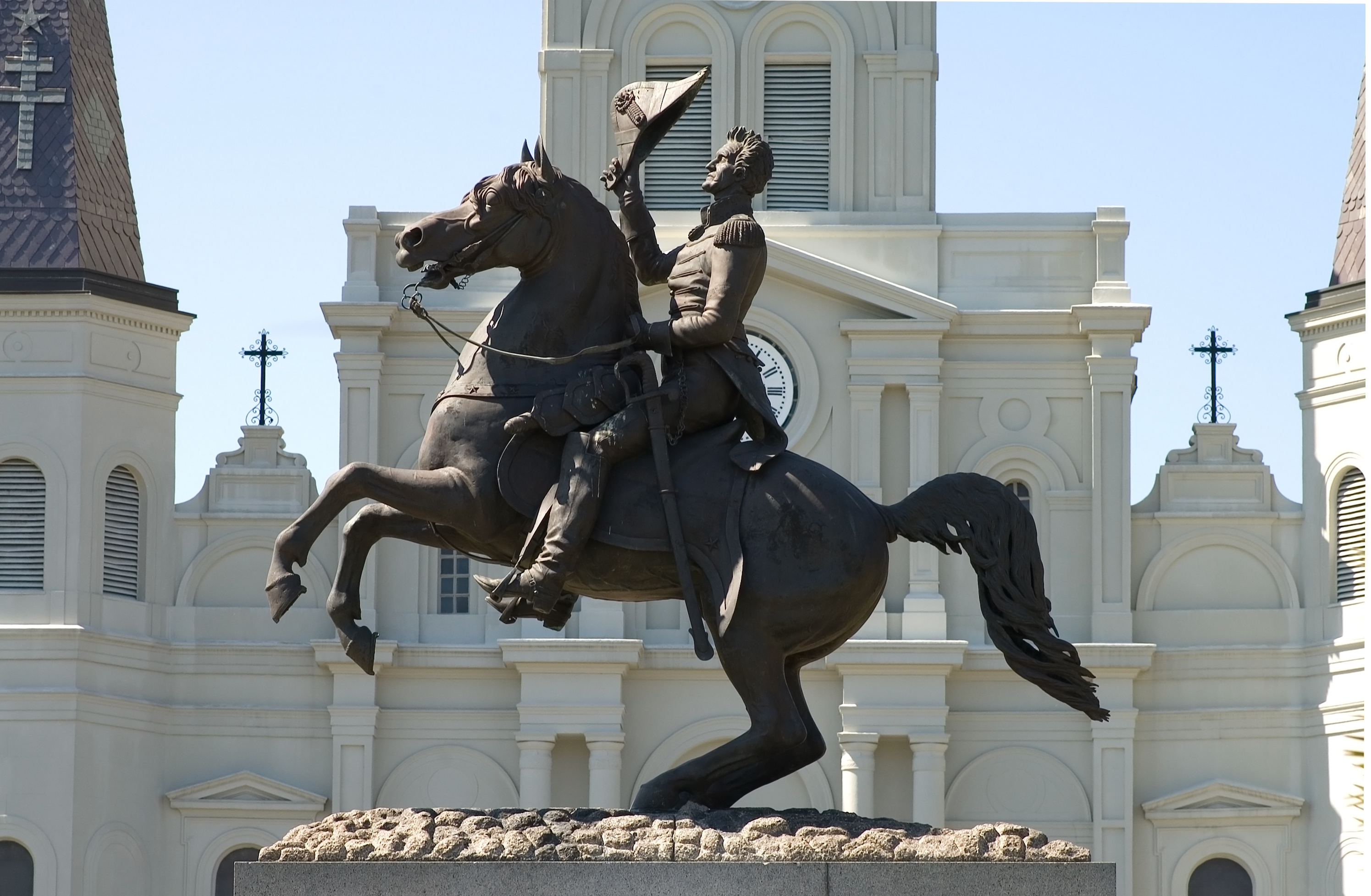
Jackson

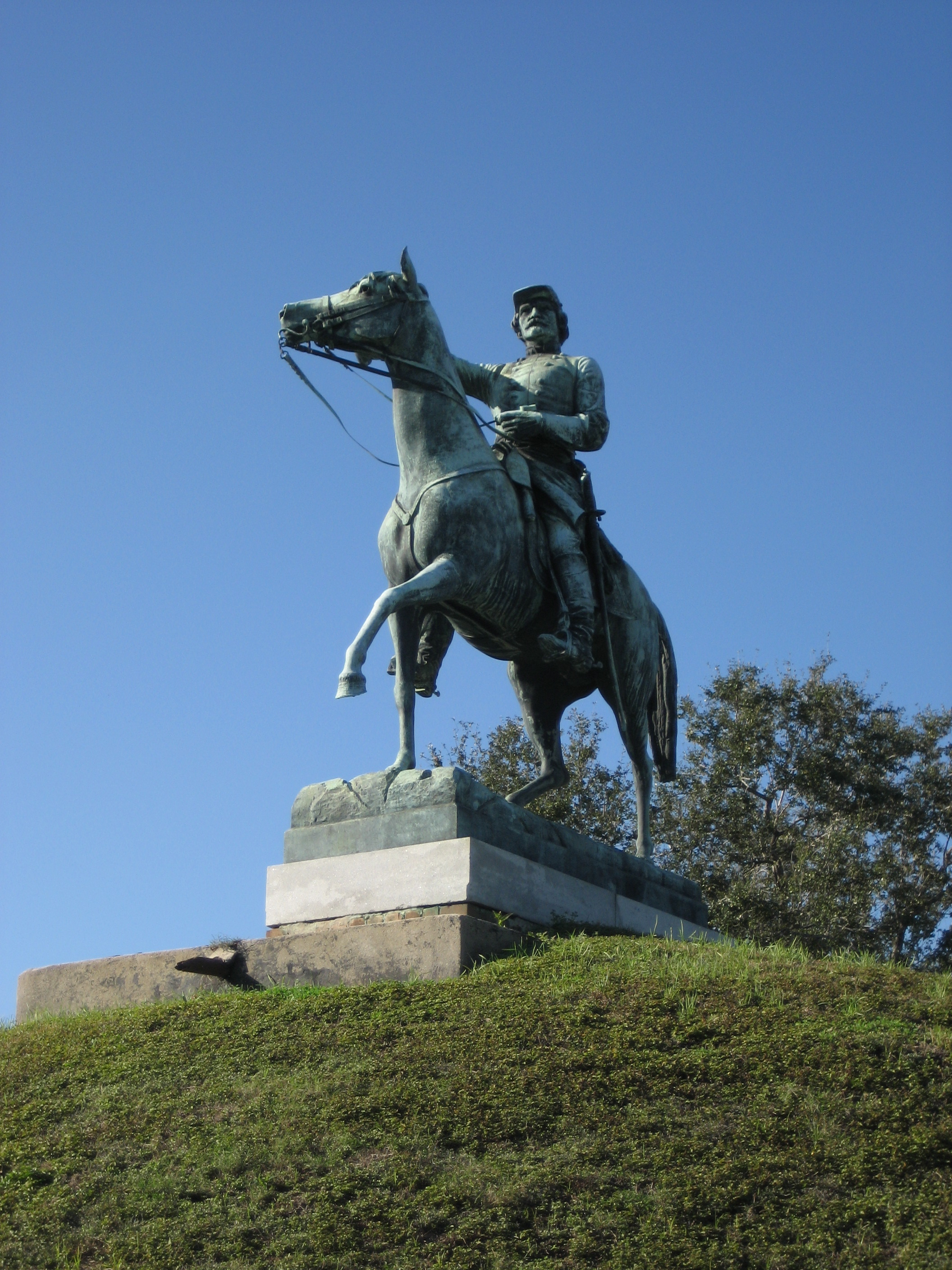
Johnston

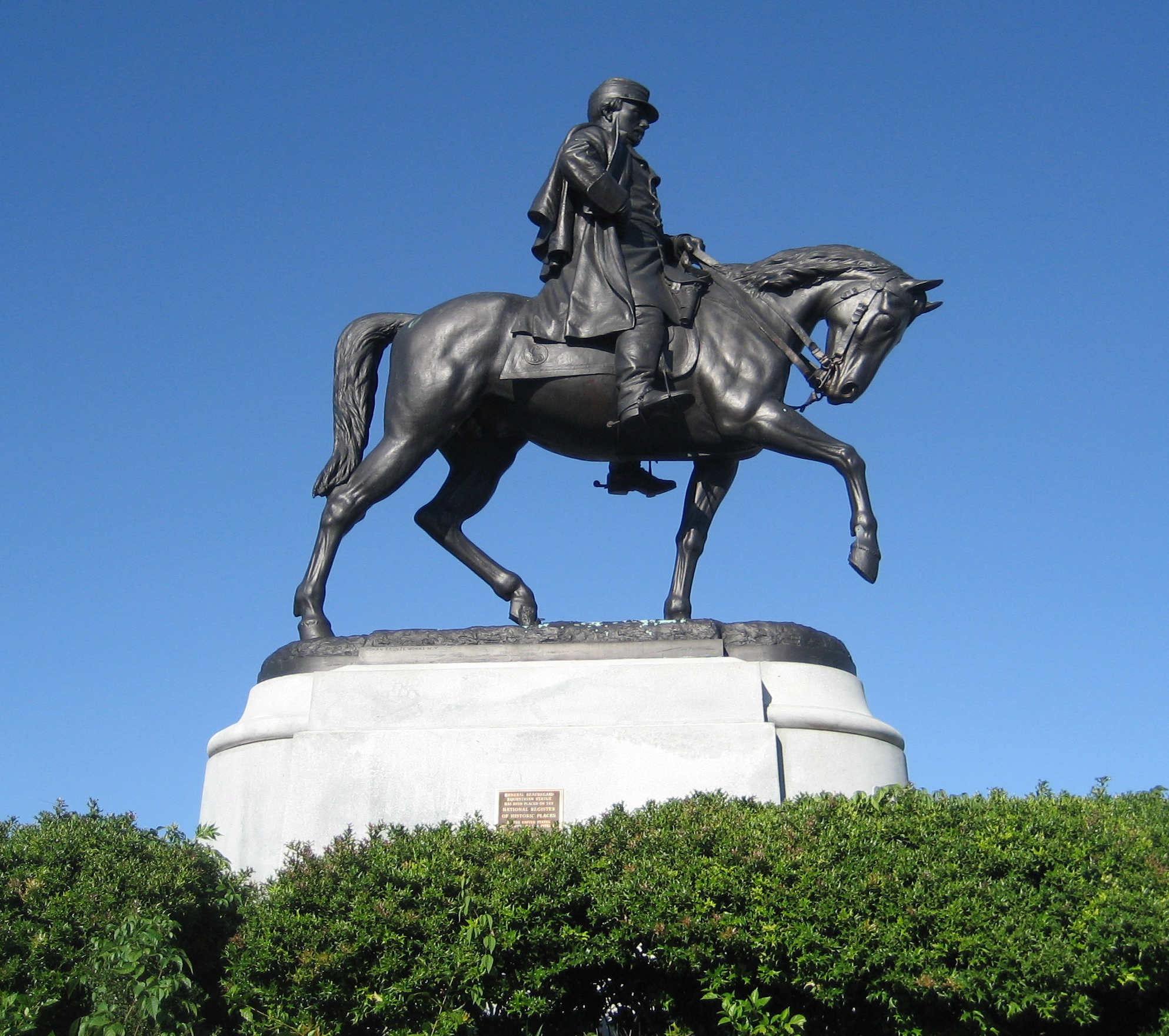
Beauregard

=== Maryland ===
- Baltimore
  - John Eager Howard Monument, by Emmanuel Frémiet, Mount Vernon Place, 1904.
  - Lafayette Monument, by Andrew O'Connor, Mount Vernon Place, 1924.
  - Lee-Jackson Monument, by Laura Gardin Fraser, Wyman Park, 1935–48.
  - Pulaski Monument, by Hans Schuler, Patterson Park, 1942–51.
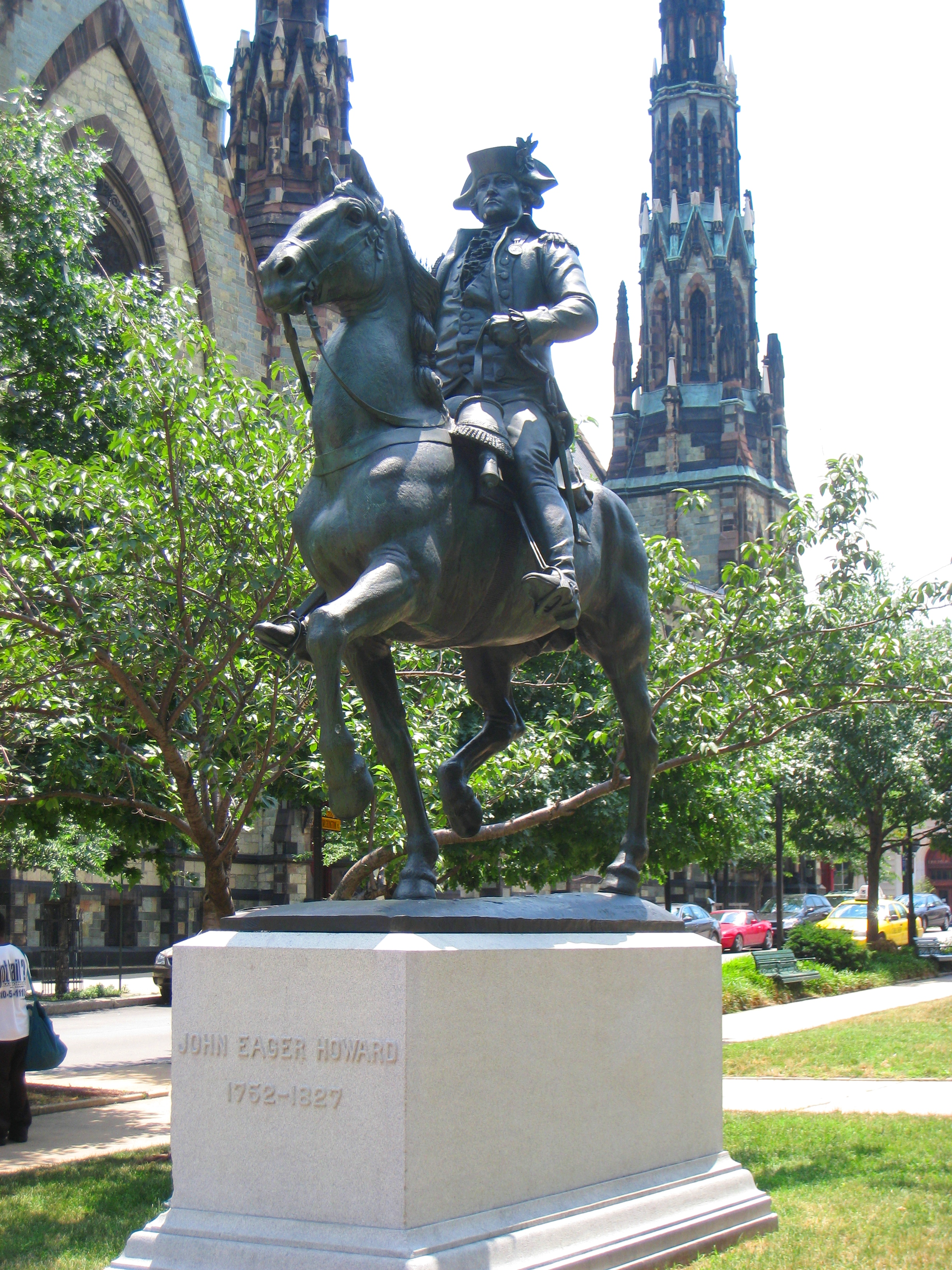
Howard

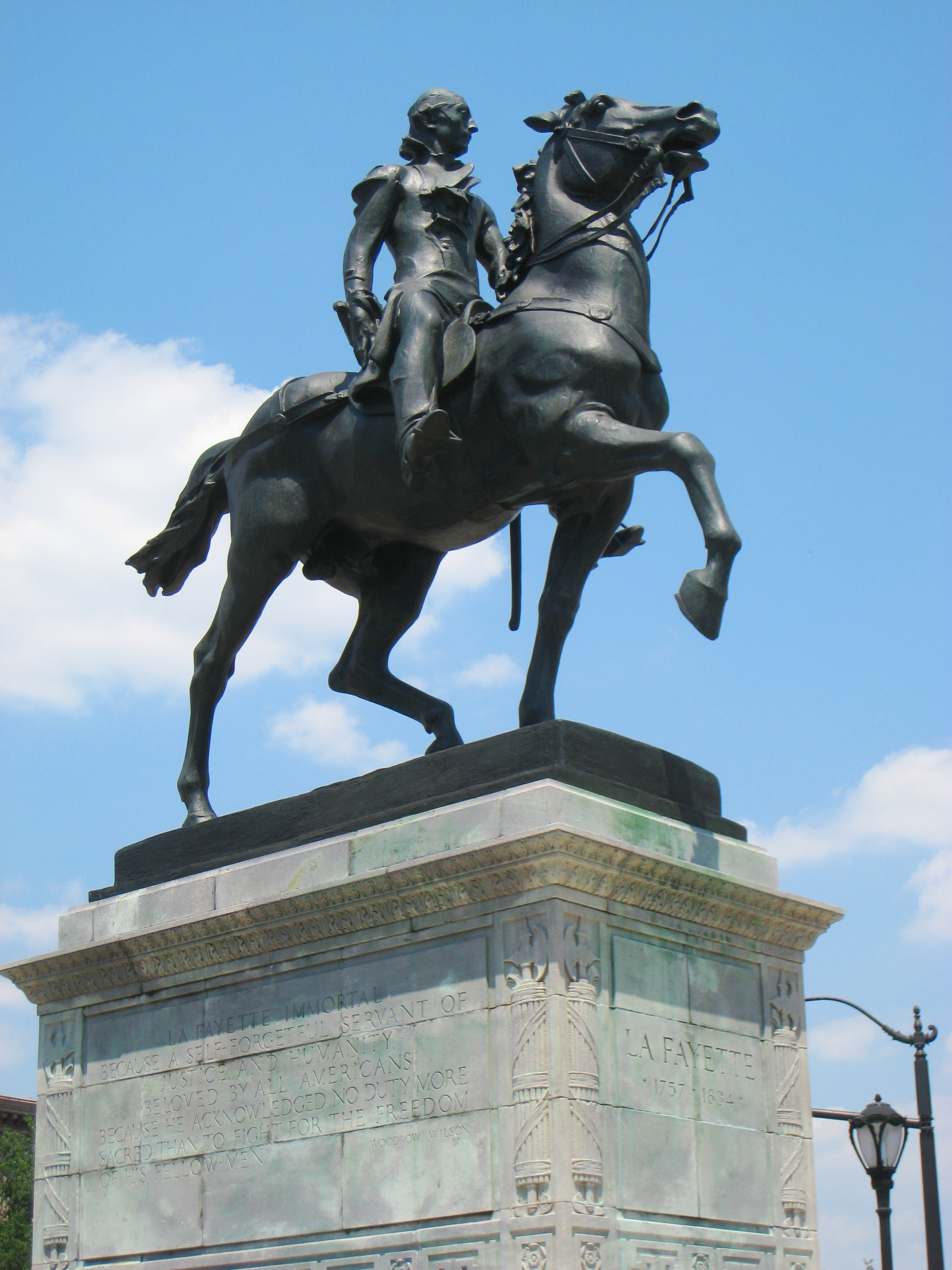
Lafayette

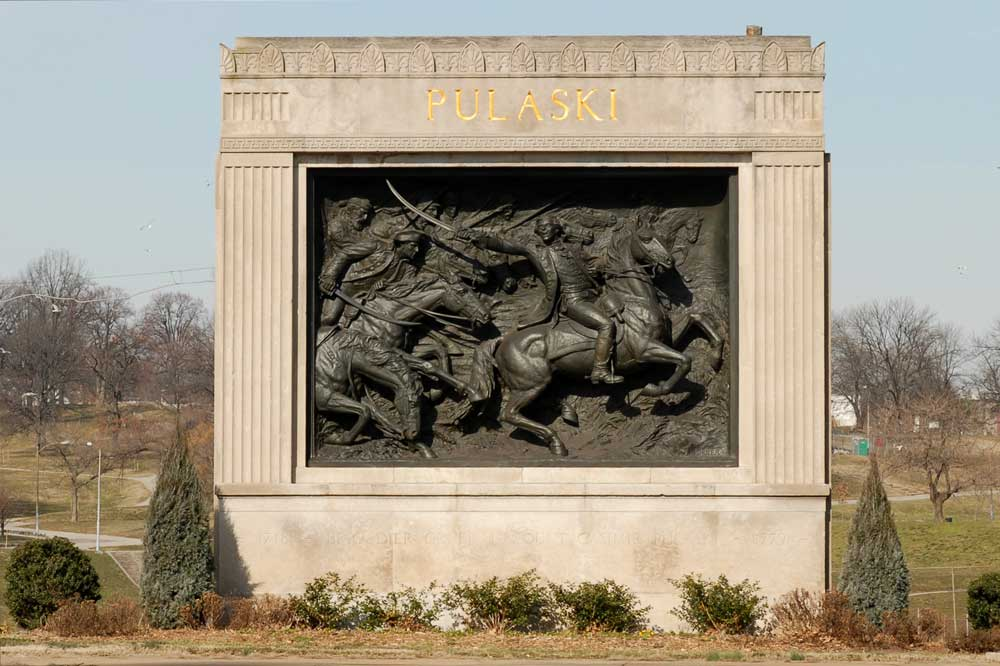
Pulaski
- Keedysville
  - Robert E. Lee Monument, by Ron Moore, the newest monument on the Antietam Battlefield, erected June 24, 2003.

=== Massachusetts ===
- Boston
  - George Washington, by Thomas Ball, Public Garden, 1869
  - Robert Gould Shaw Memorial, by Augustus Saint-Gaudens, Boston Common, 1884
  - General Joseph Hooker, by Daniel Chester French (Hooker) and Edward Clark Potter (horse), Massachusetts Statehouse, 1903
  - Appeal to the Great Spirit, by Cyrus Dallin, Museum of Fine Arts, Boston, 1908
  - Paul Revere, by Cyrus Dallin, Paul Revere Plaza, North End, Boston, 1940.
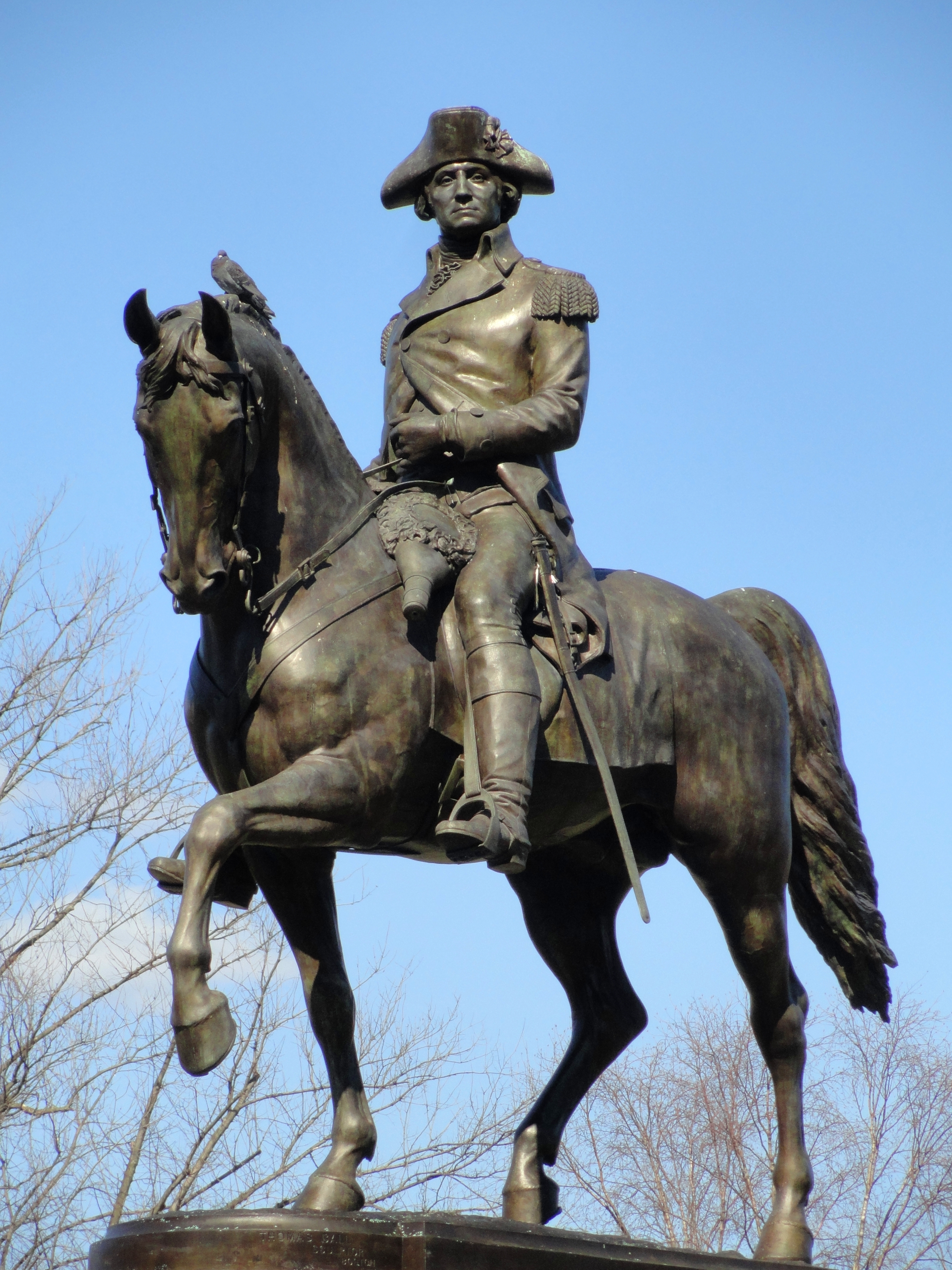
Washington

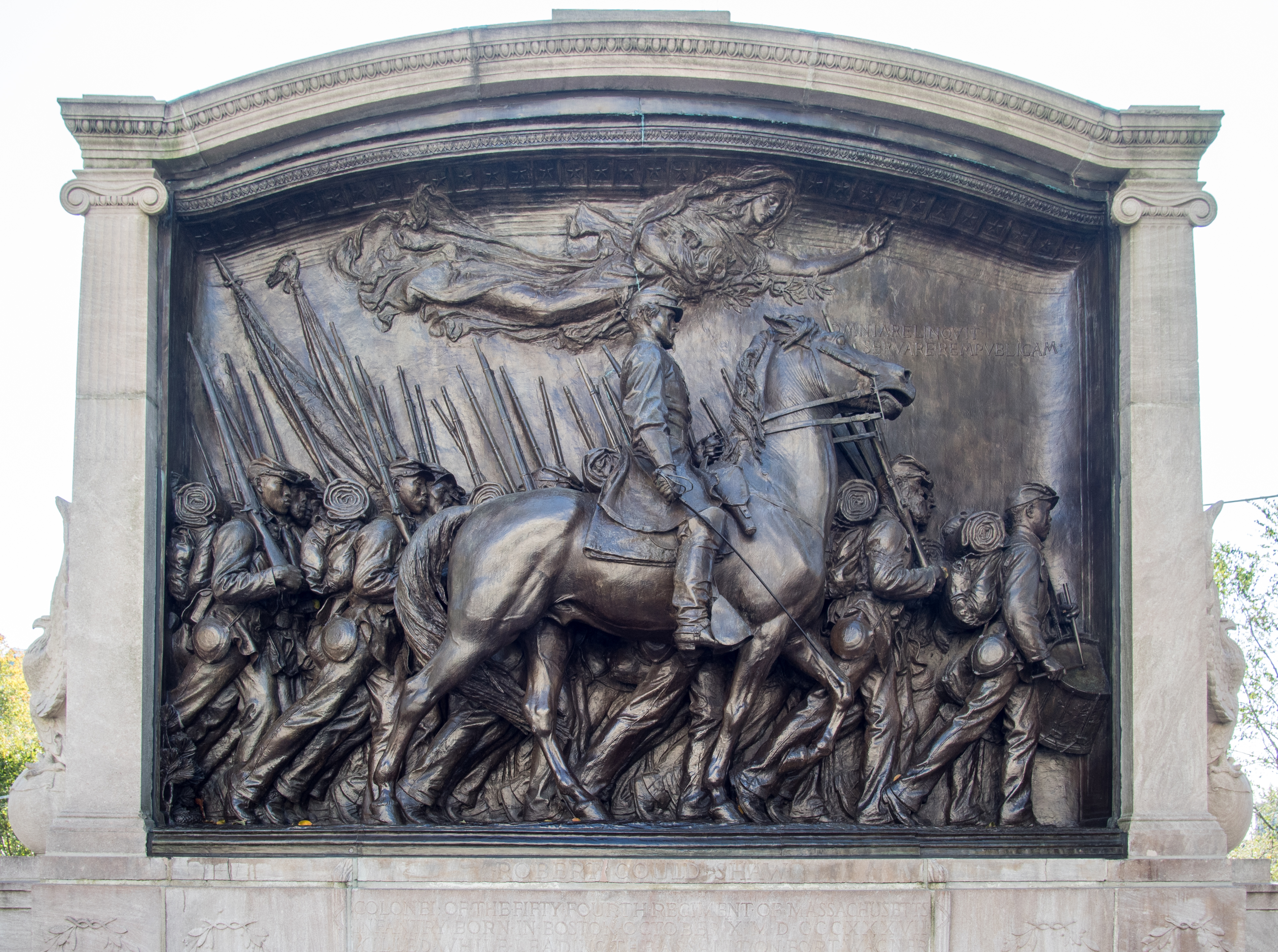
Shaw Memorial

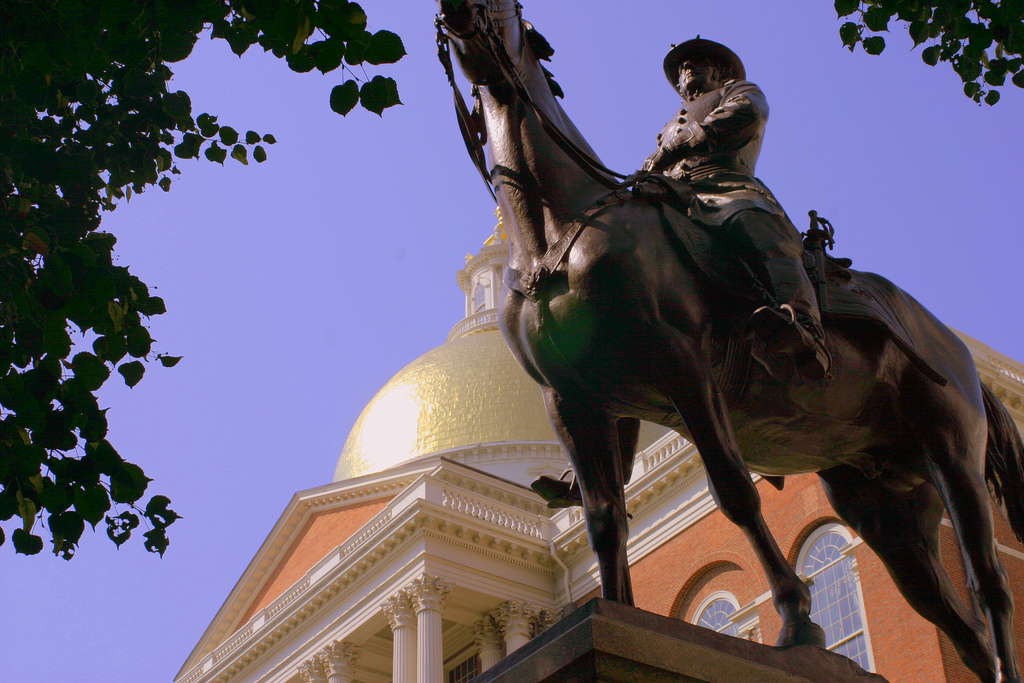
Hooker

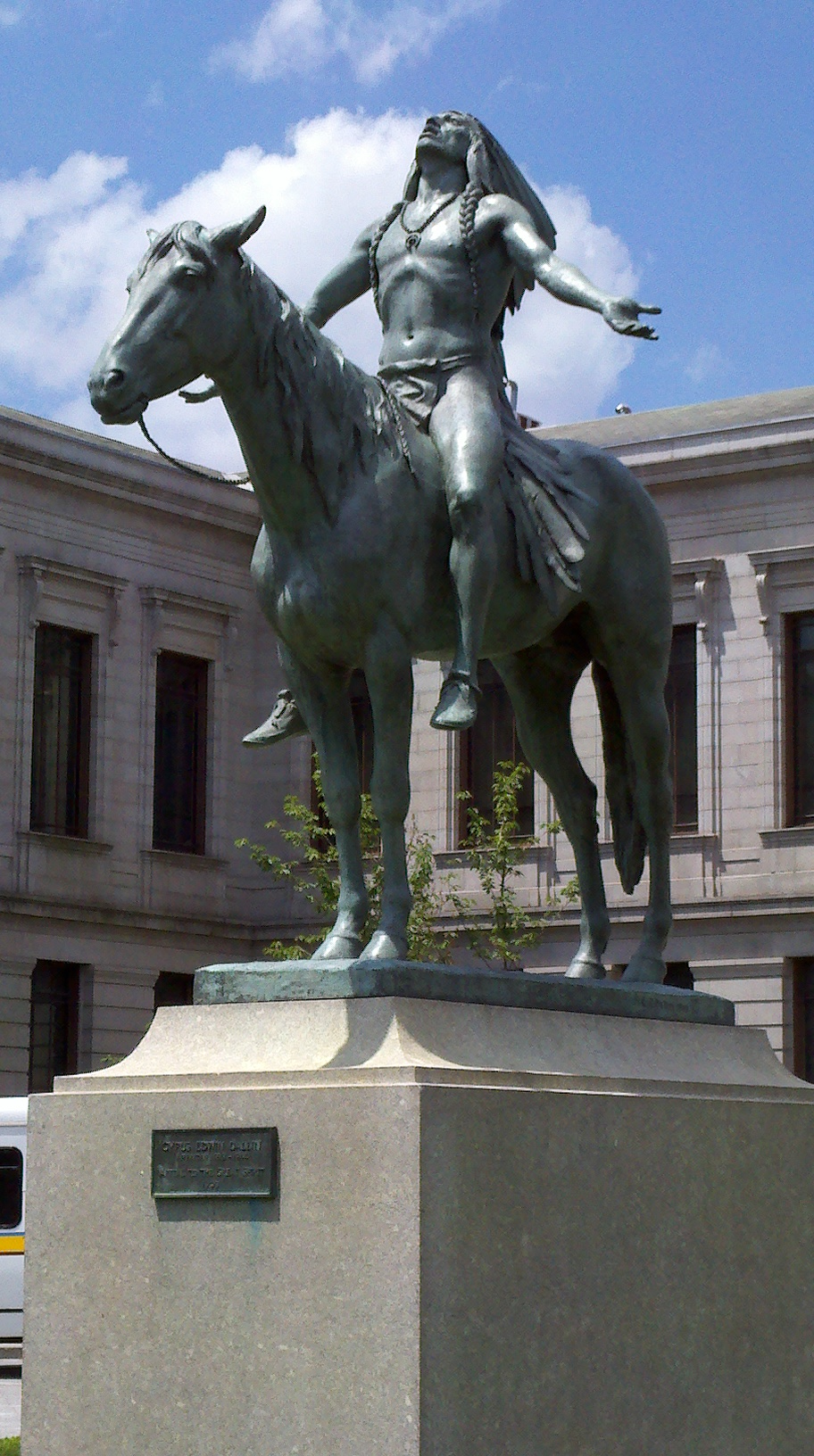
Appeal to the Great Spirit

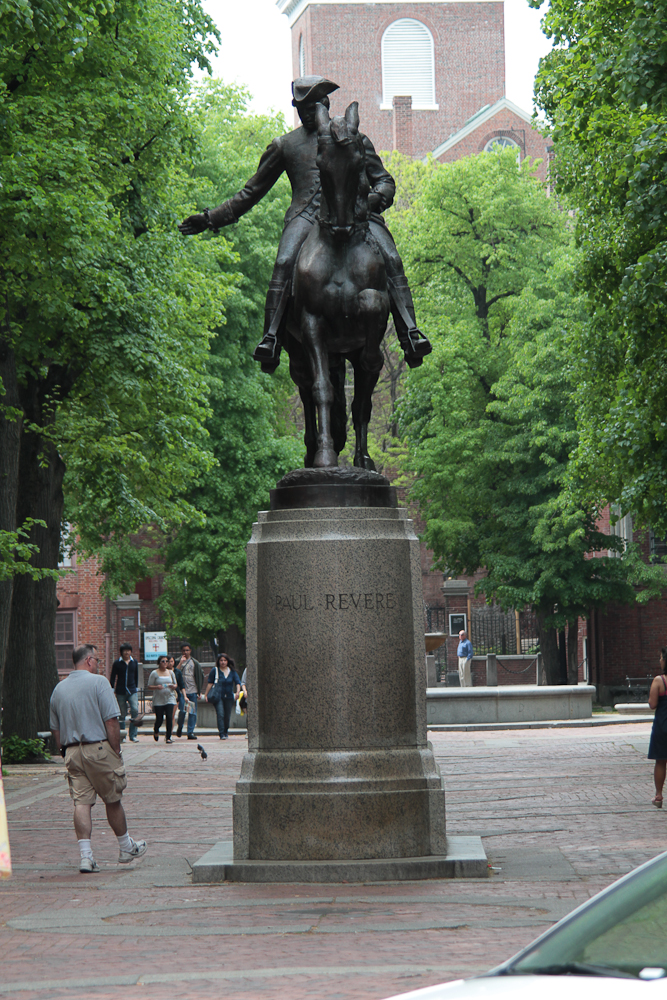
Paul Revere
- Danvers
  - William Penn Hussey, by George Thomas Brewster, New England Home for the Deaf, 1916.
- Gloucester
  - Joan of Arc, by Anna Hyatt Huntington, 1910, this cast 1921.
- Fall River
  - Lafayette by Ettore and Arnaldo Zucchi, Lafayette Park, 1916
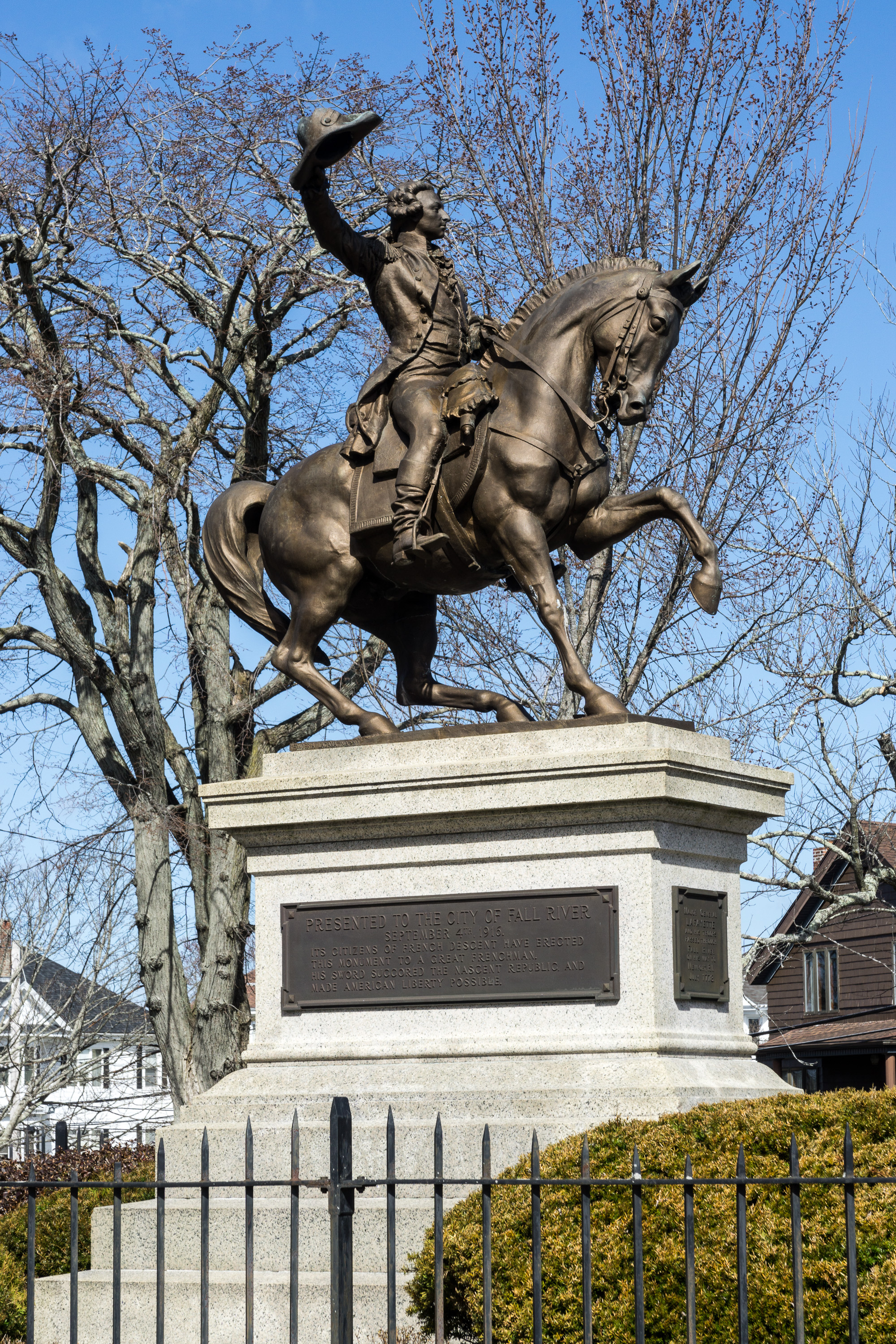
Lafayette
- Milford
  - William Draper, by Daniel Chester French (Draper) and Francis Herman Packer (horse), Draper Park, 1910–1912.
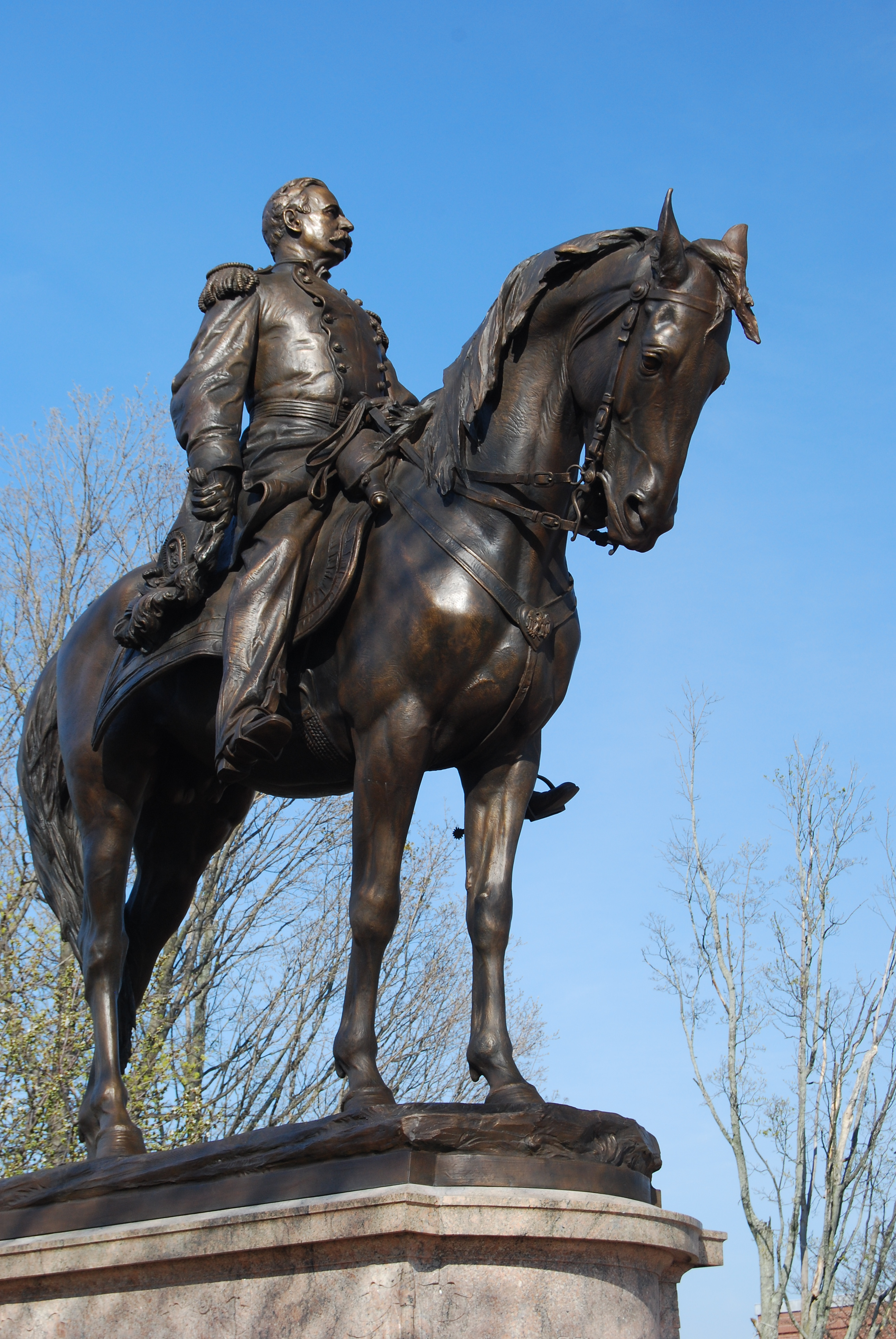
Draper
- Walpole
  - Lieutenant Barchariah Lewis, by S. Barnicoat, Lewis Square, 1911.
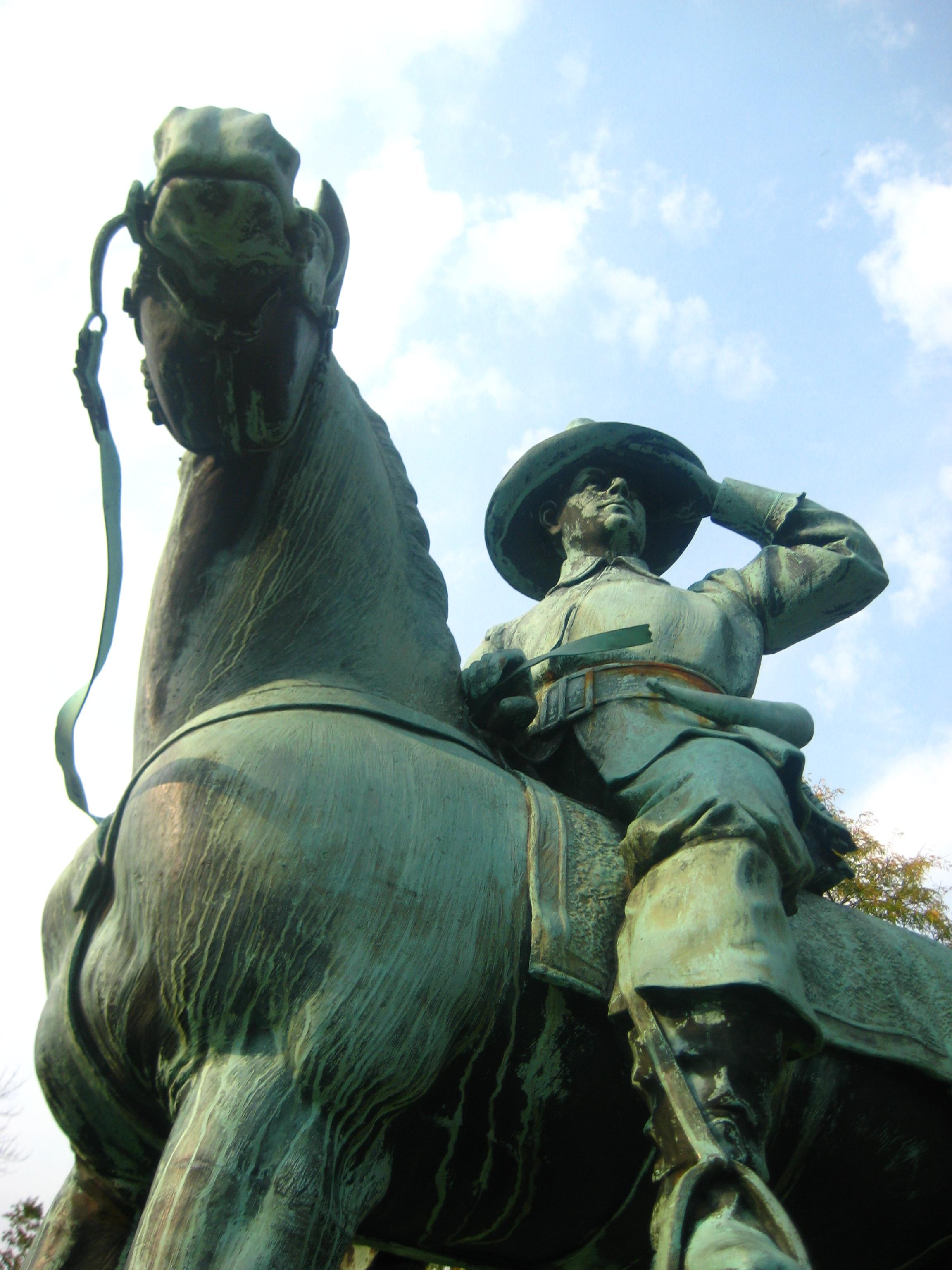
Lewis
- Worcester
  - General Charles Devens Memorial, by Daniel Chester French (Devens) and Edward Clark Potter (horse), Main & Highland Streets, 1905–06.
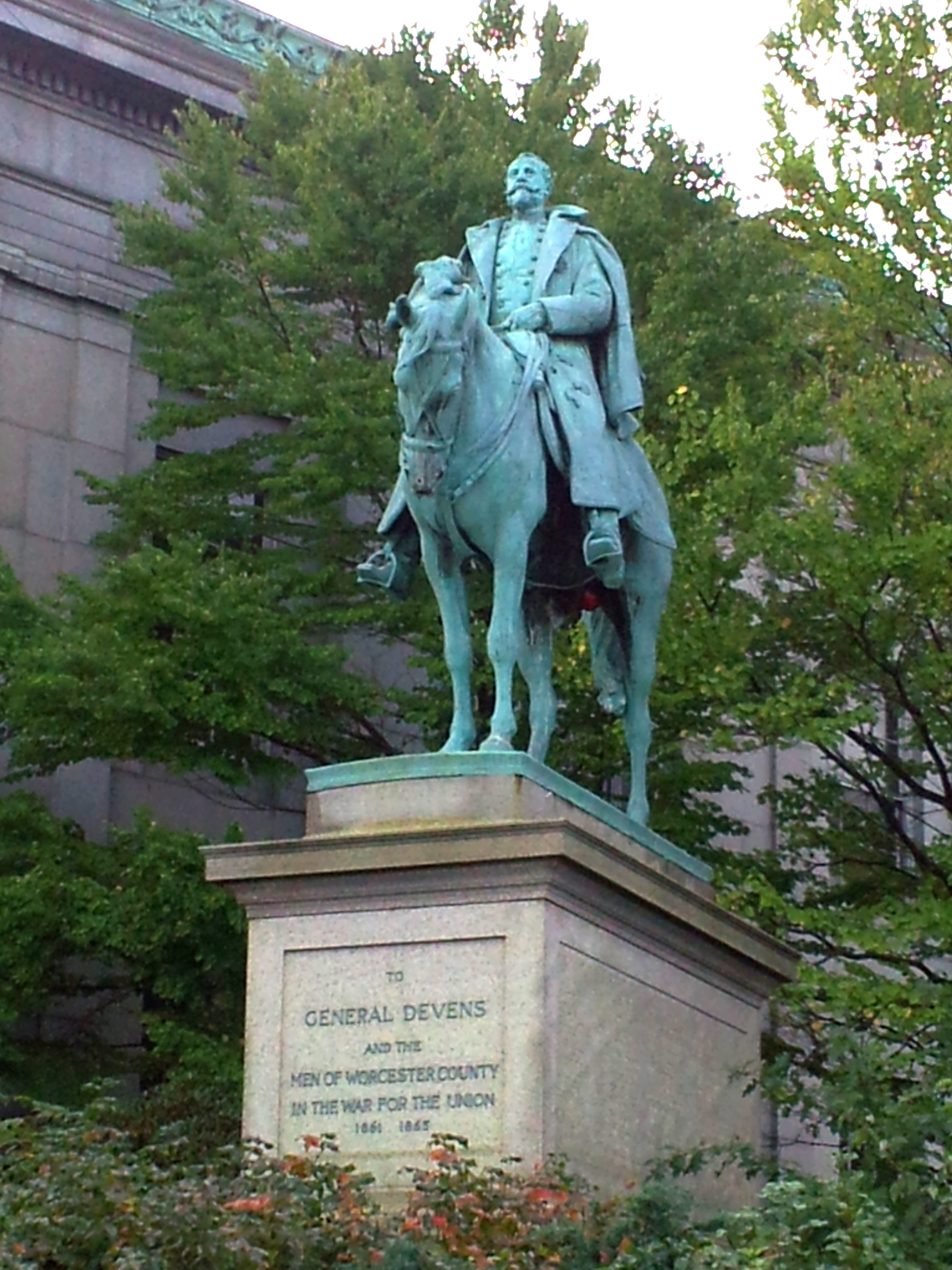
Devens

=== Michigan ===
- Detroit
  - Thaddeus Kosciuszko, by Victor Zin, Michigan-Third Street Park, 1978. A copy after Leonard Marconi's 1904 statue in Kraków, Poland.
  - Major General Alpheus Starkey Williams, by Henry Merwin Shrady, Belle Isle Park, 1921.
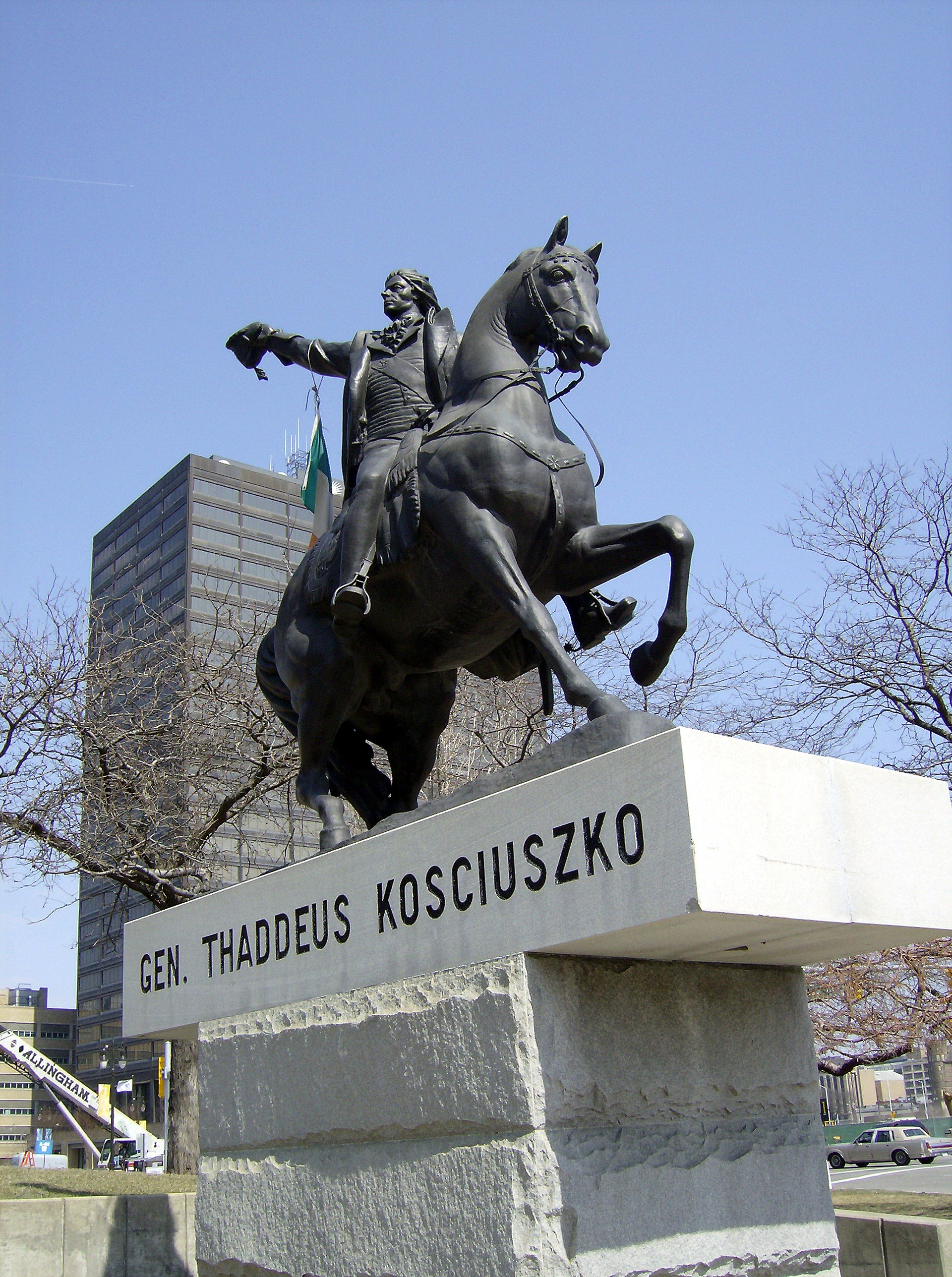
Kosciuszko

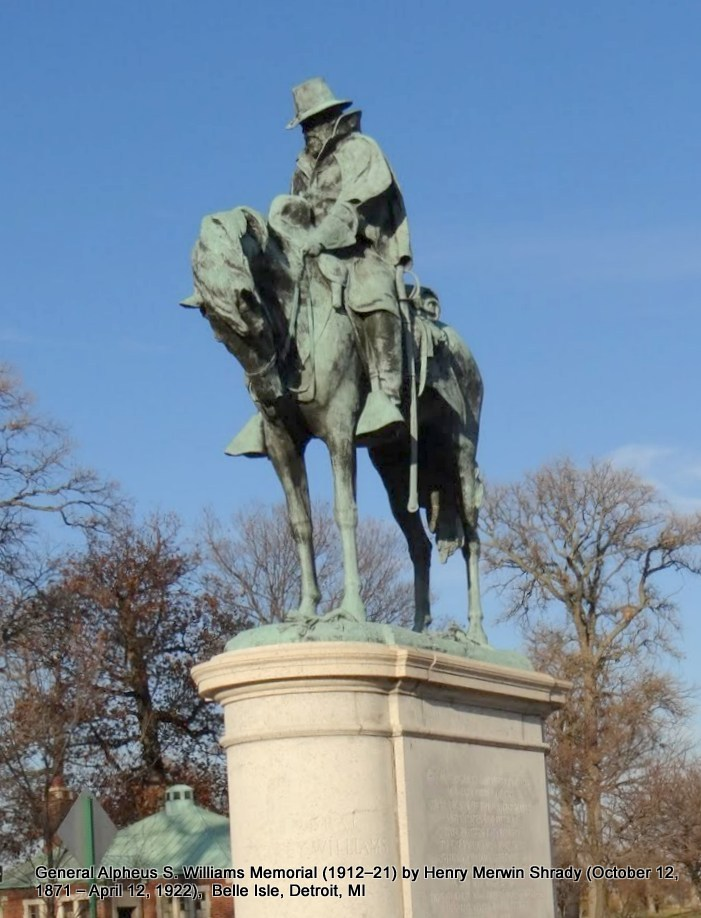
Major General Alpheus Starkey Williams
- Midland
  - Abraham Lincoln Equestrian Monument (Young Abe Lincoln), by Anna Hyatt Huntington, Northwood Institute, Midland, 1961, this casting 1963.

George Armstrong Custer-Monroe.

Abraham Lincoln, Adrian College Library, same as the Northwood Lincoln, but much smaller.

=== Minnesota ===
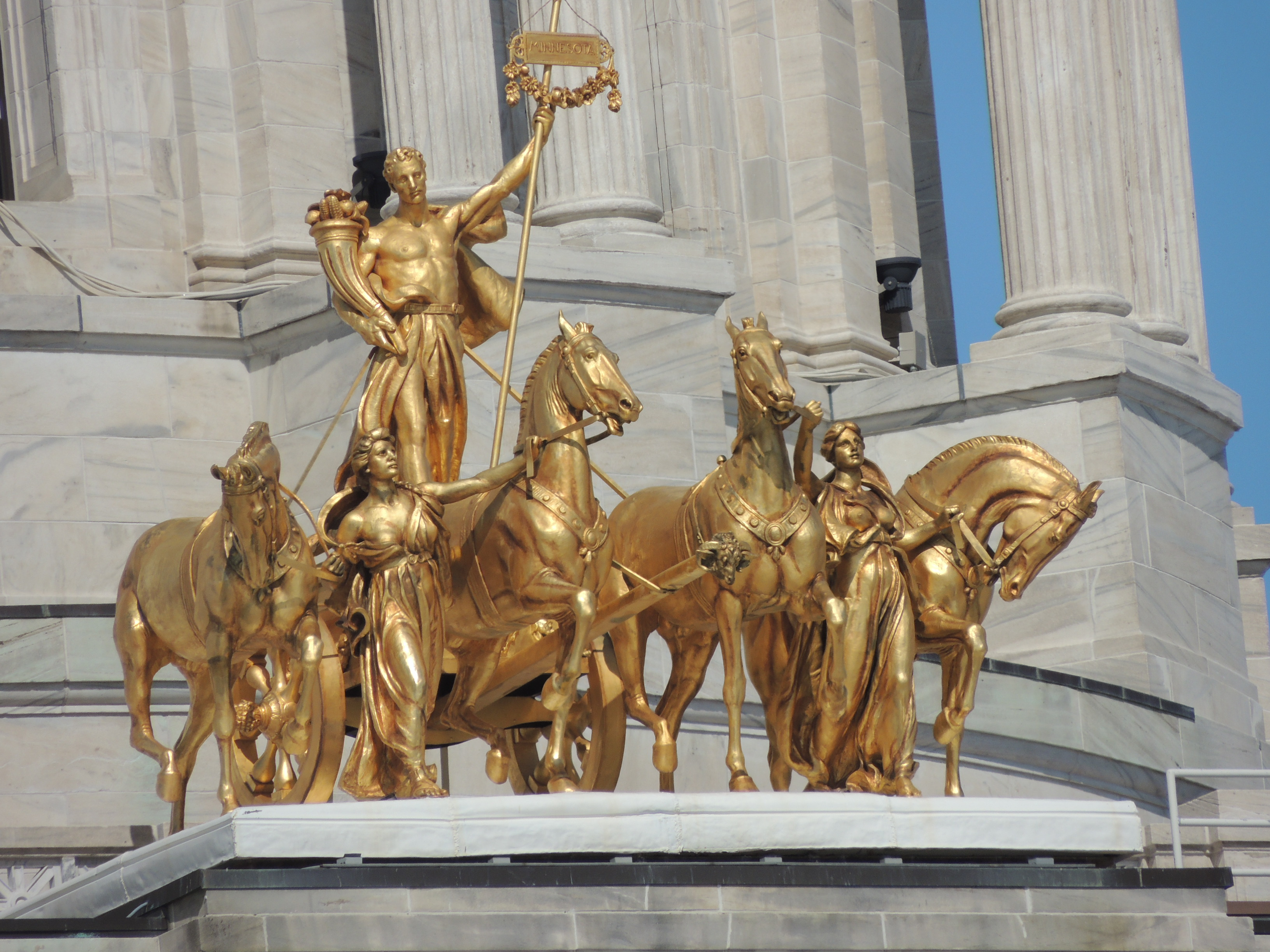
Progress of the State, Minnesota State Capitol

- Bloomington
  - Chief Thunderbird, by Robert Johnson, Thunderbird Hotel, 1980.
- St Paul
  - Progress of the State, Minnesota State Capitol by Daniel Chester French and Edward Clark Potter, 1906

=== Mississippi ===
- Vicksburg
  - Iowa Monument, by Henry Hudson Kitson, Vicksburg National Military Park, 1906–07.
  - Major-General Ulysses S. Grant, by Frederick Cleveland Hibbard, Vicksburg National Military Park, 1919.
  - Major-General John A. McClernand, by Edward Clark Potter, Vicksburg National Military Park, 1919.
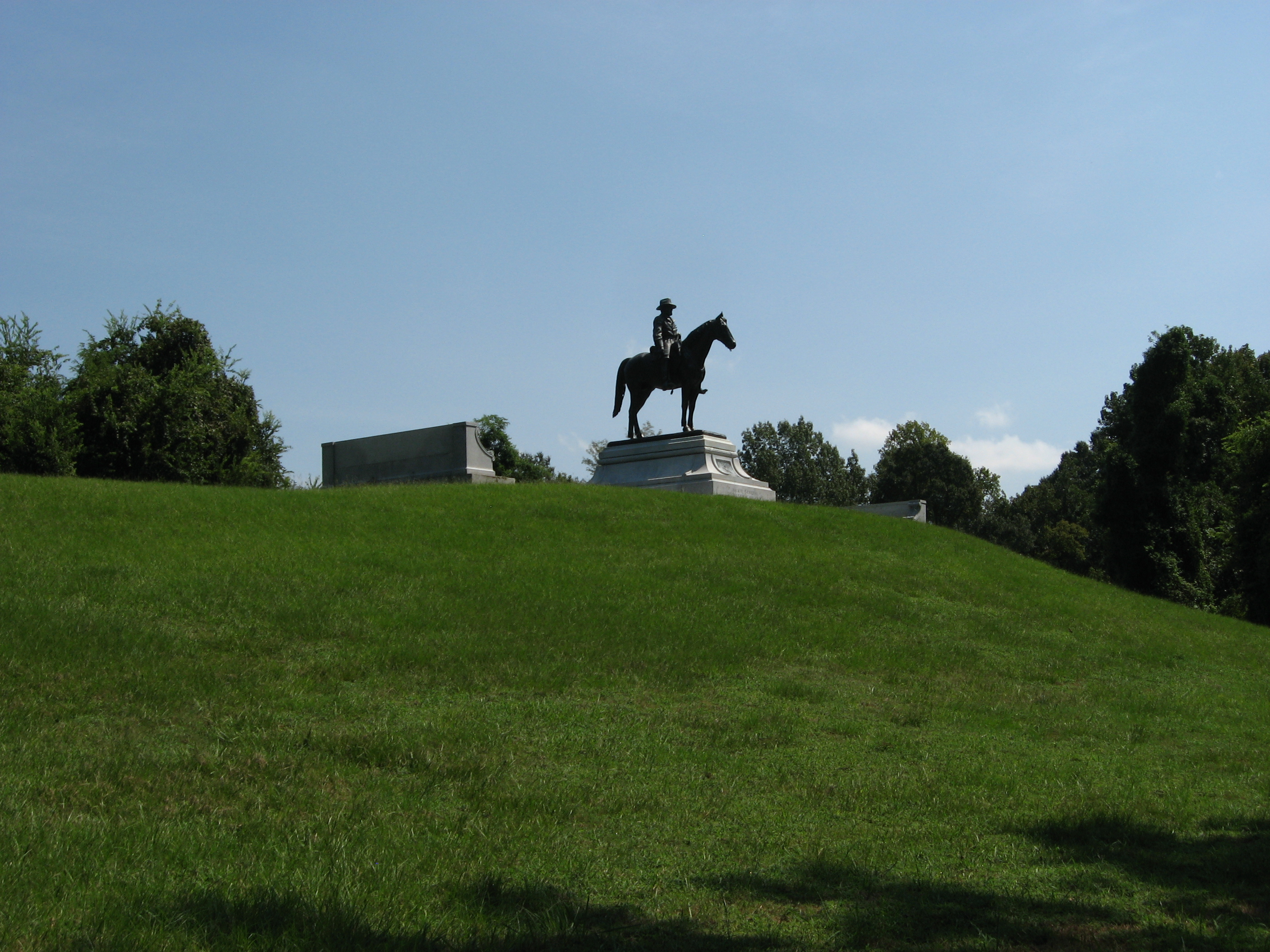
Grant

=== Missouri ===
- Independence
  - Andrew Jackson, by Charles Keck, Independence Square Courthouse, 1934, this cast 1949. It is a smaller edition of Keck's statue in Kansas City, Missouri.
- Kansas City
  - George Washington at Valley Forge, by Henry Shrady, Washington Park, 1906, this cast 1925. A replica of Shrady's statue in Brooklyn, New York City.
  - J.C. Nichols Memorial Fountain, by Henri-Léon Gréber, Country Club Plaza, 1910. Relocated in the 1950s from Harbor Hill in Roslyn, New York. The four equestrian statues may be allegorical figures of major rivers, with the Native American rider representing the Mississippi River.
  - The Scout, by Cyrus Dallin, Penn Valley Park, overlooking Downtown Kansas City, 1915.
  - Pioneer Mother, Alexander Phimister Proctor, Penn Valley Park, 1923.
  - Andrew Jackson by Charles Keck, Jackson County Courthouse, 1934.
  - The Wagon Master, by Gus Shafer, Intercontinental Hotel, 1973.
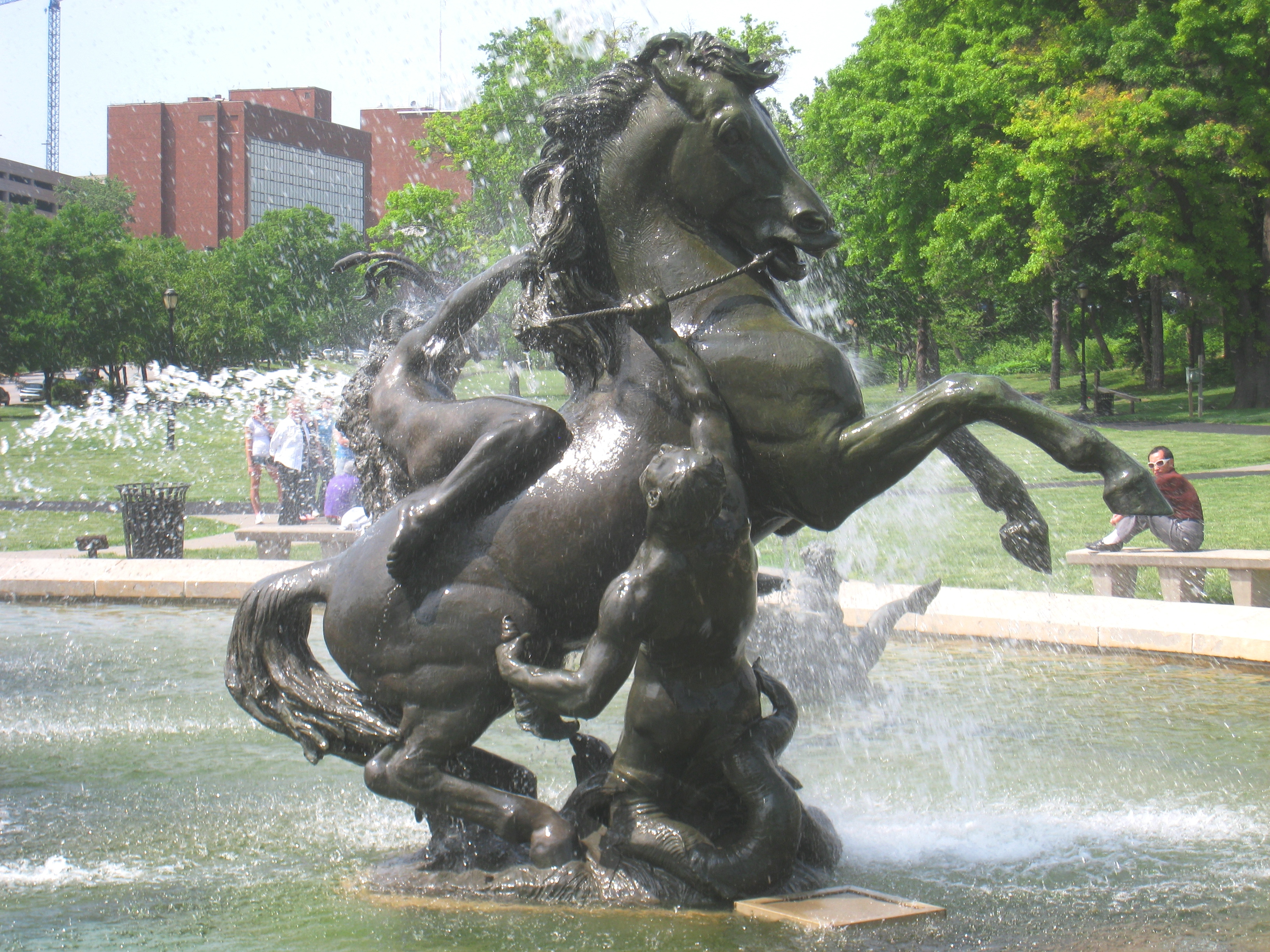
J.C. Nichols Fountain

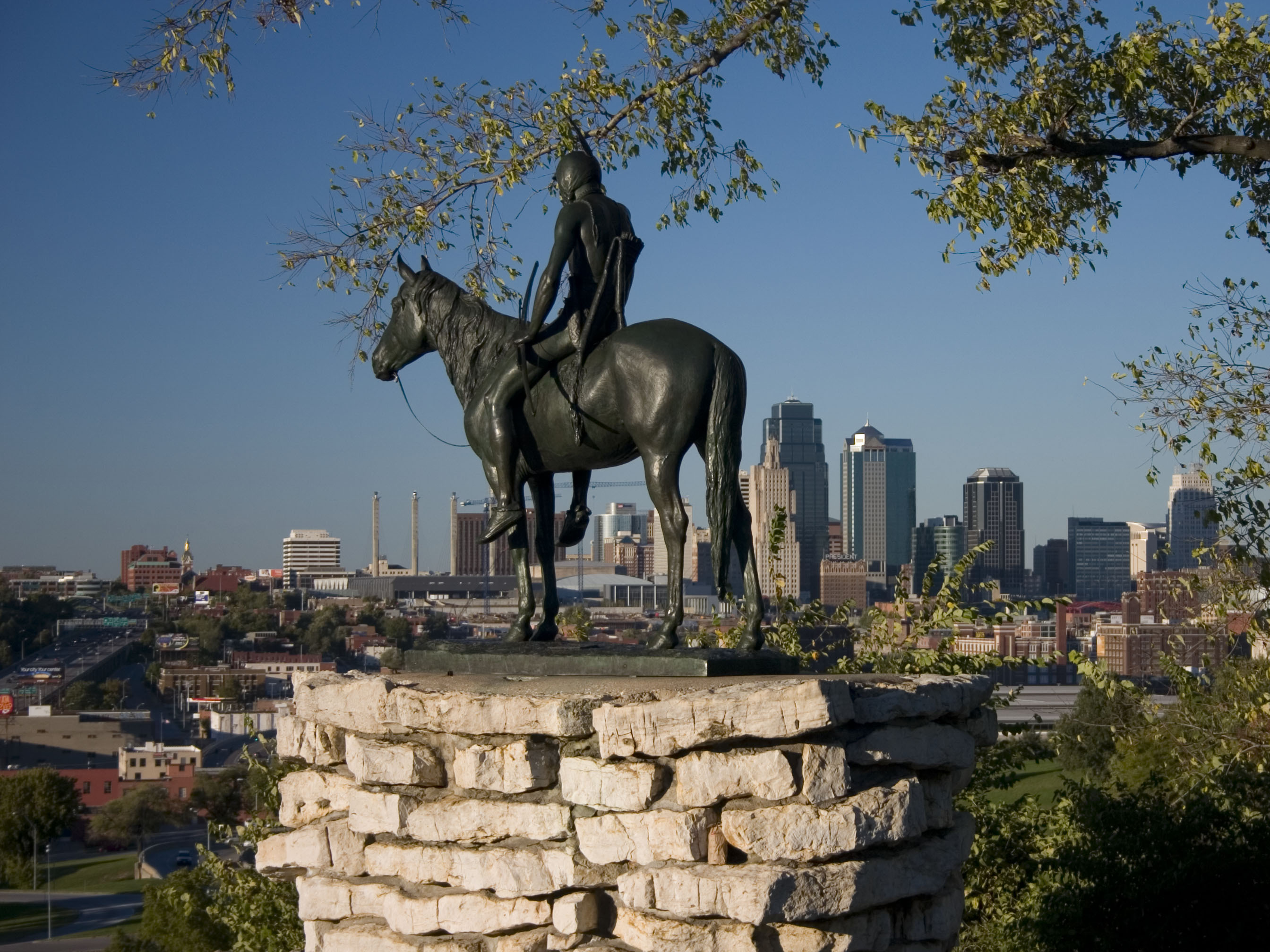
The Scout

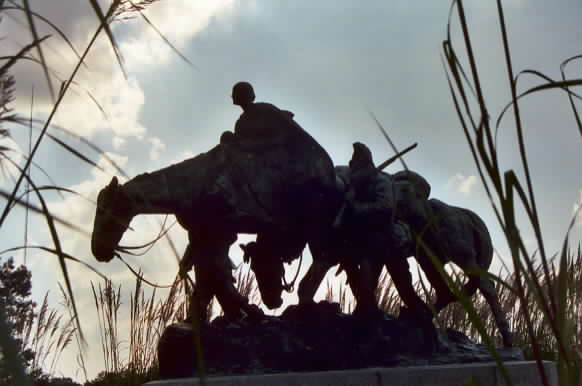
Pioneer Mother

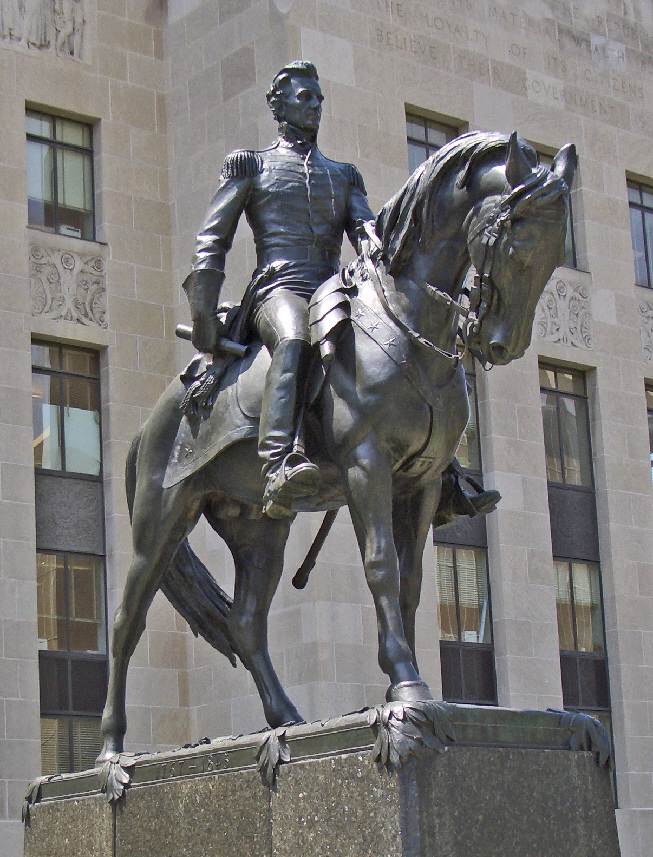
Jackson
- St. Joseph
  - Pony Express Memorial, by Hermon Atkins MacNeil, Civic Center Triangle, 1940.
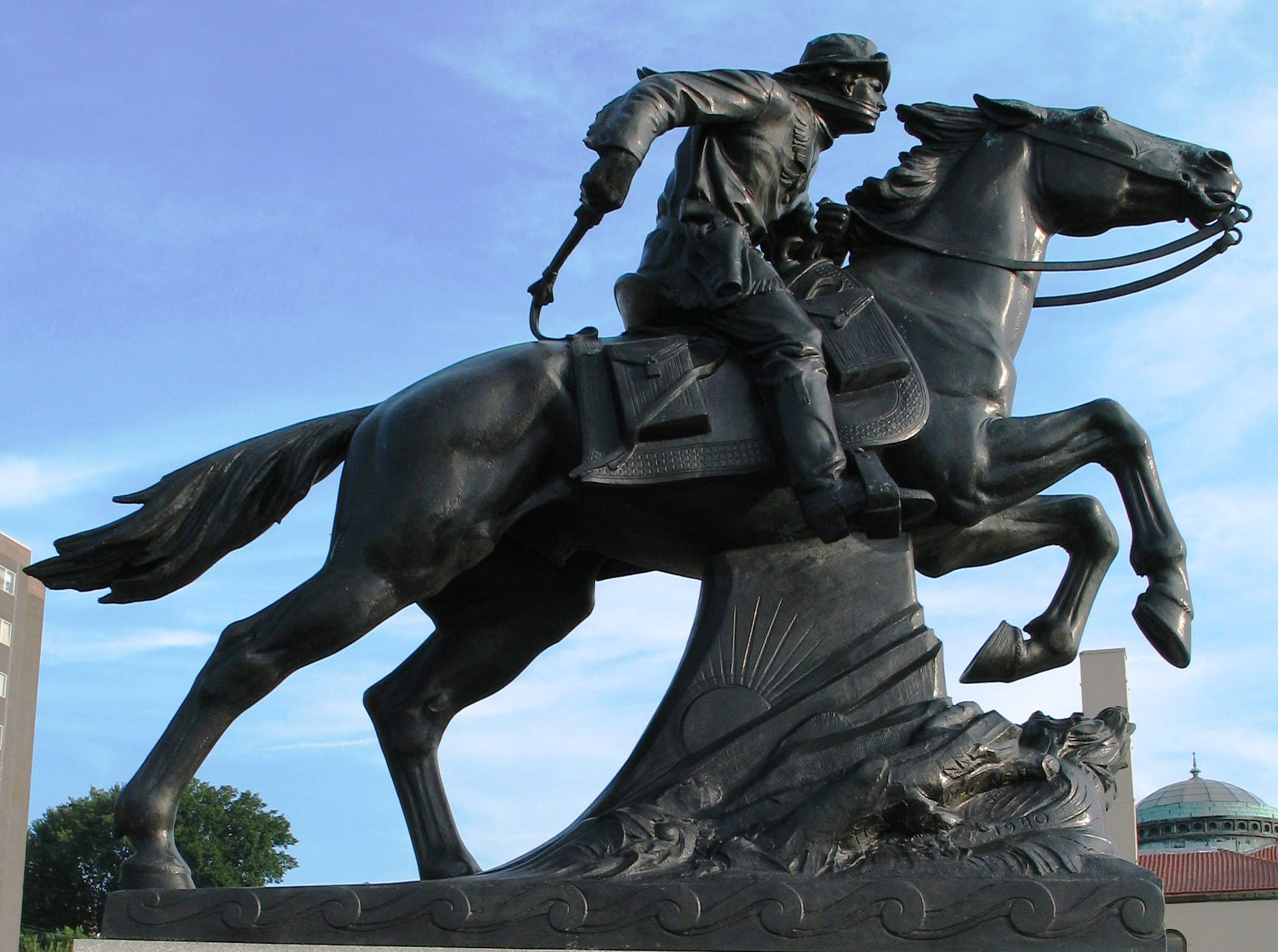
Pony Express
- St. Louis
  - Apotheosis of St. Louis, by Charles Henry Niehaus, Saint Louis Art Museum, 1903.
  - General Franz Sigel, by Robert Cauer, Forest Park, 1906.
  - Monument to Camp Jackson (General Nathaniel Lyon), by Erhardt Siebert, Lyon Park, 1929.
  - Courage, Sacrifice, Loyalty, Vision, by Walker Hancock, Soldiers' Memorial, 1938–39.
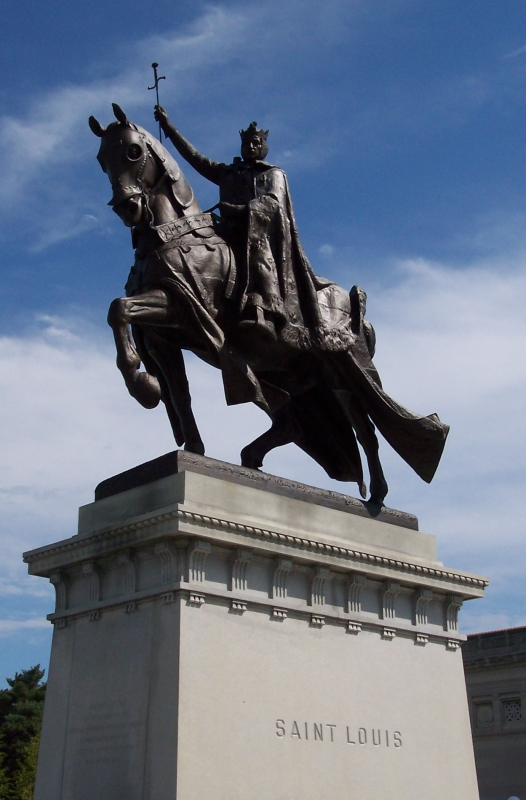
Apotheosis of St. Louis

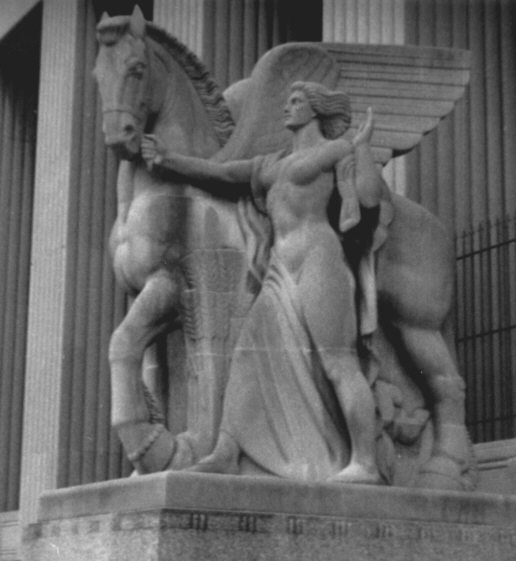
Vision

=== Montana ===
- Billings
  - 7th Cavalry Guidon Trooper, by Lyndon Fayne Pomeroy, KTVQ, 1978.
- Bozeman
  - Pioneer Nelson Story, by Jim Dolan, Lindley Park, 1984.
- Conrad
  - The Cowboy, by Jim Dolan, Conrad High School, ca. 1983.
- Helena
- Thomas Francis Meagher, by Charles J. Mulligan, in front of Montana State Capitol, 1904–05.
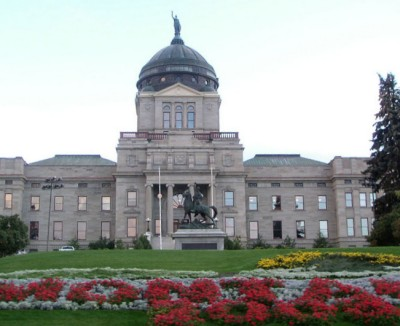
Meagher
- Miles City
  - Horse and Rider, by Leo L. Olson, Custer County High School, 1971.
- Wolf Point
  - Homage to the Pioneers, by Floyd Tennyson DeWitt, Main Street, 1976

=== Nevada ===
- Las Vegas
  - Equestrian statue of Rafael Rivera, by Jim Carey, Rafael Rivera Park, 1978
  - Tribute to a Cowboy, by Deborah Copenhaver, South Point Hotel & Casino, 1988.
- Stateline
  - Pony Express Rider, by Avard Fairbanks, Harrah's Hotel & Casino Lake Tahoe, 1962.

=== New Hampshire ===
- Manchester
  - General Casimir Pulaski, by Lucien H. Gosselin, Pulaski Park, 1937–38.
- Portsmouth
  - General Fitz John Porter, by James Edward Kelly, Haven Park, 1904–06.
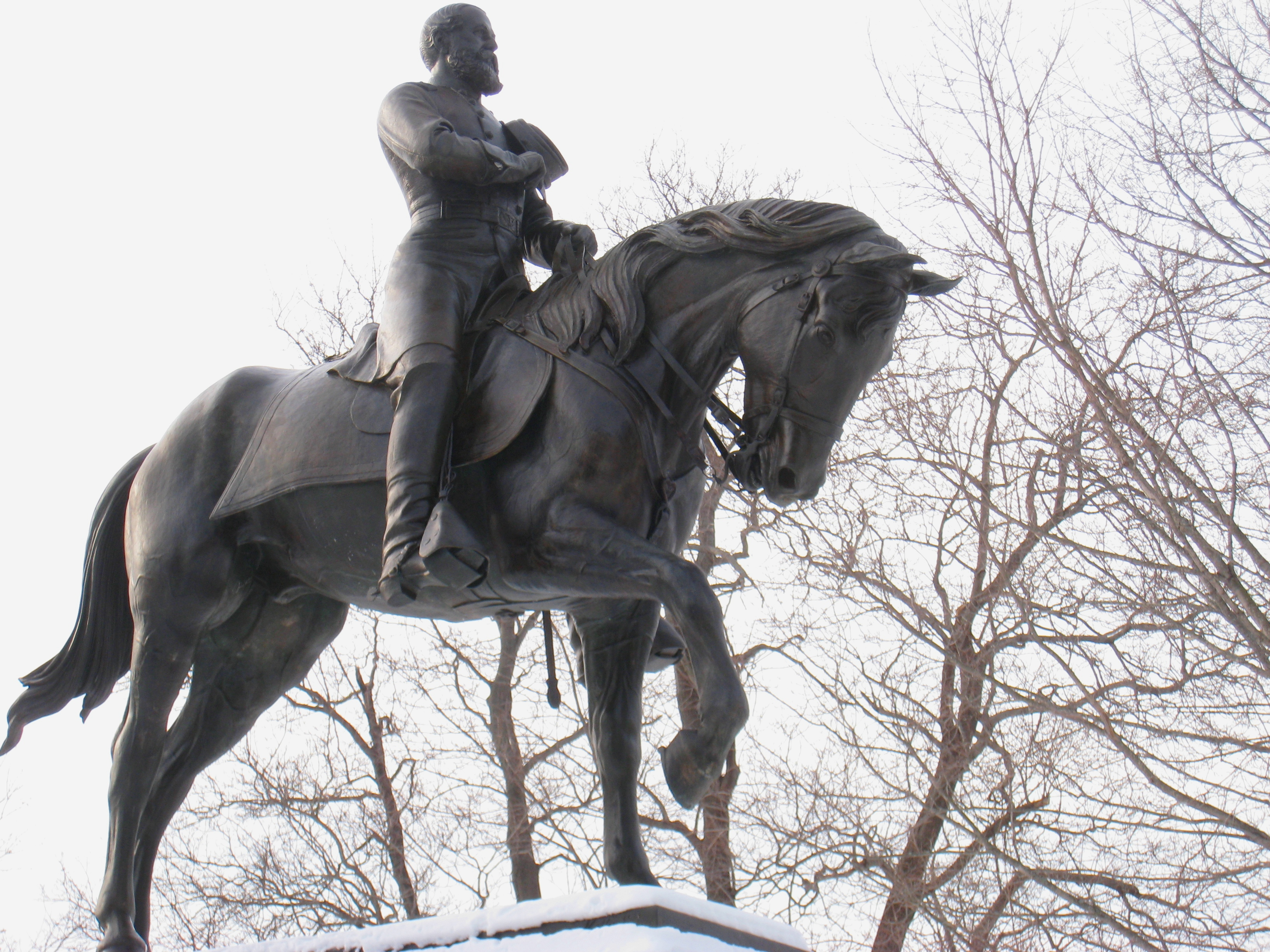
Porter

=== New Jersey ===
- Hoboken
  - The Torch Bearers, by Anna Hyatt Huntington, Stevens Institute of Technology, 1953–55.
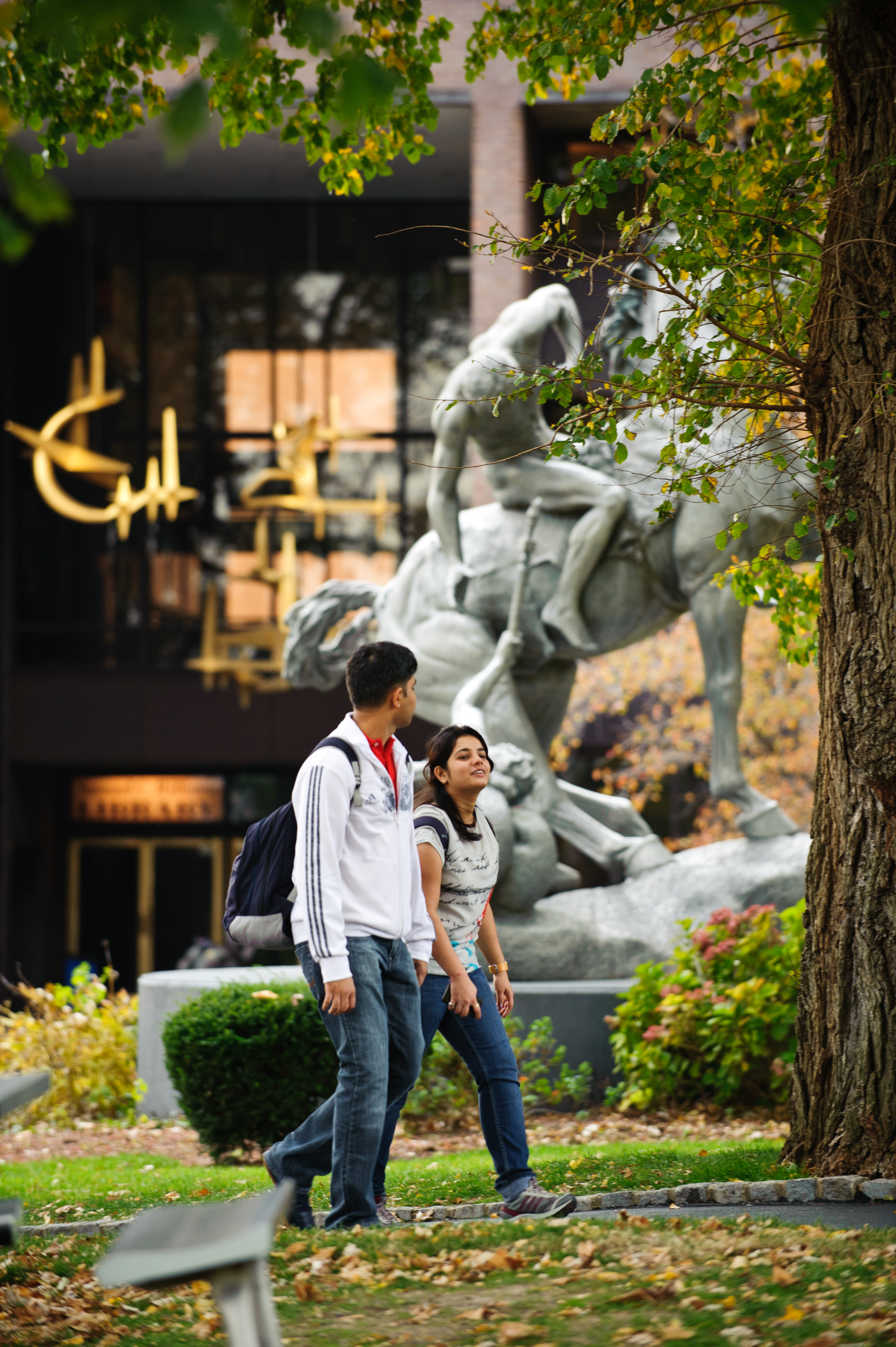
The Torchbearers
- Madison
  - Francis Asbury, by Augustus Lukeman, Drew University, 1926.
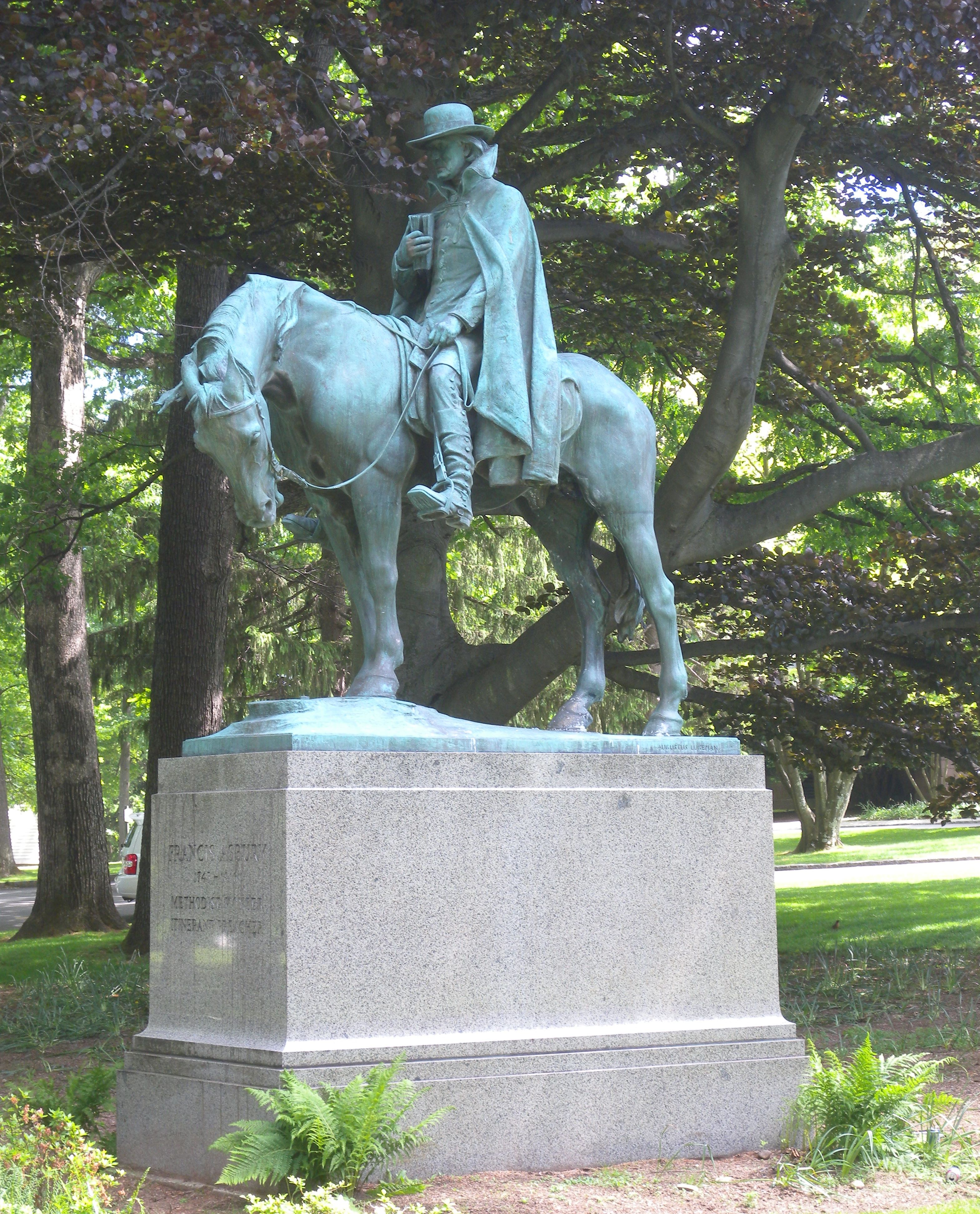
Asbury
- Morristown
  - George Washington, by Frederick Roth, Washington's Headquarters, 1927–1928.
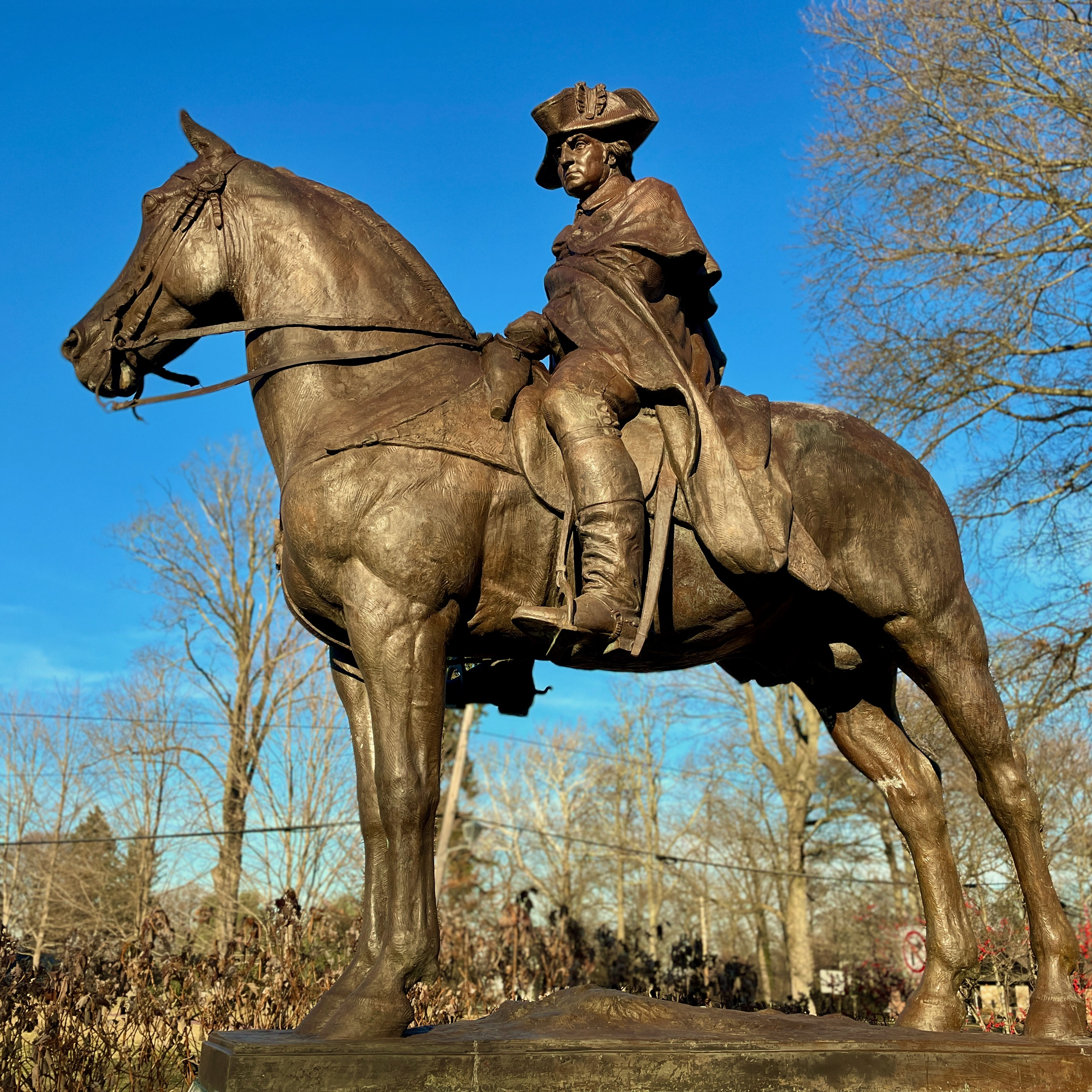
Washington
- Newark
  - George Washington, by J. Massey Rhind, Washington Park, 1912.
  - Bartolommeo Colleoni, by J. Massey Rhind, Clinton Park, 1912–16. A copy after Andrea del Verrocchio's ca. 1488 statue in Venice, Italy.
  - Wars of America, by Gutzon Borglum, Military Park (Newark), 1926.
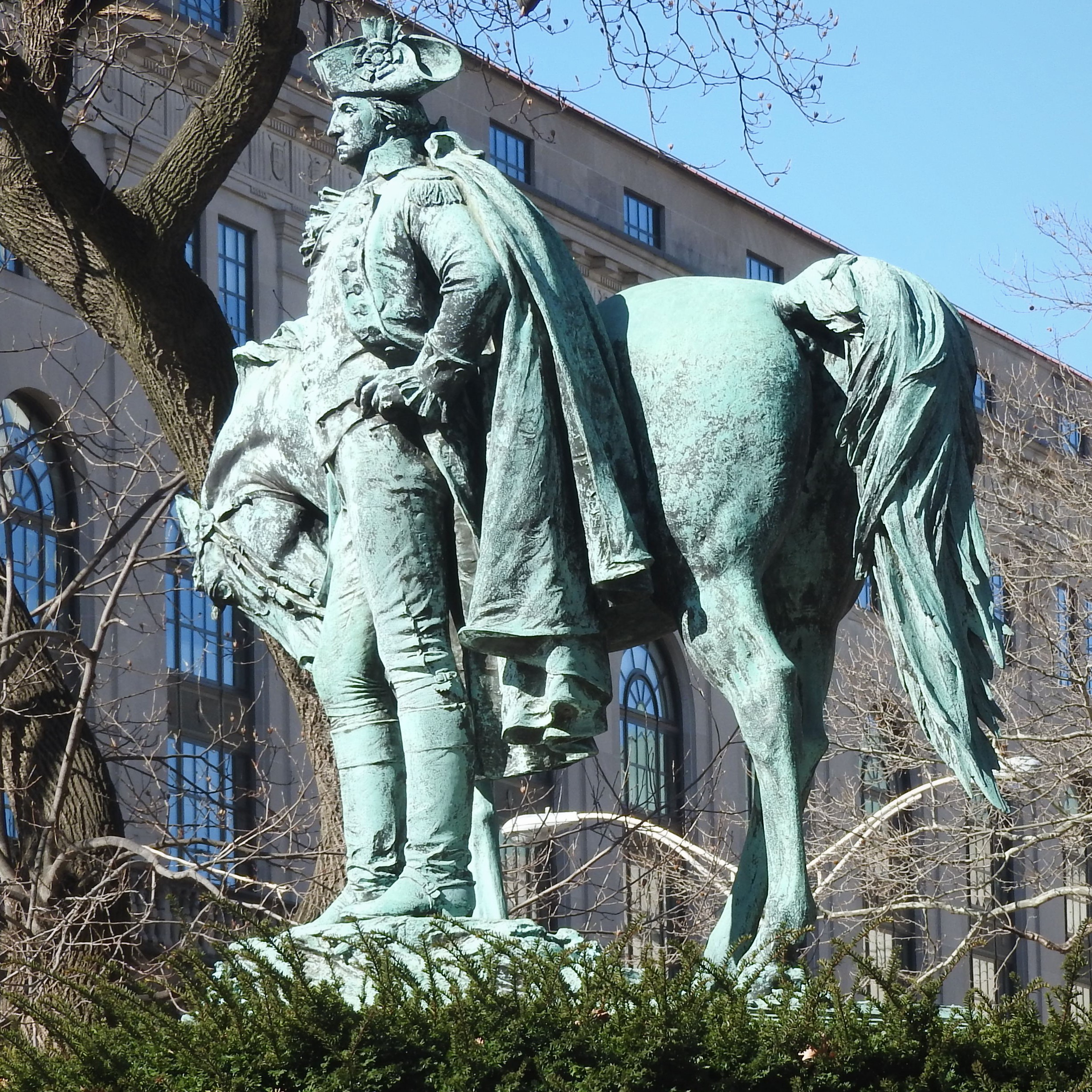
Washington

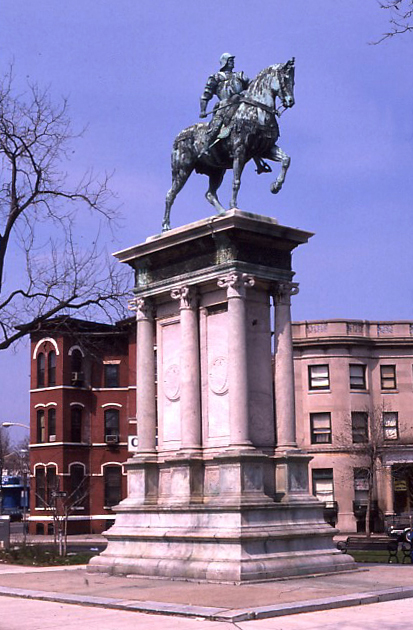
Colleoni

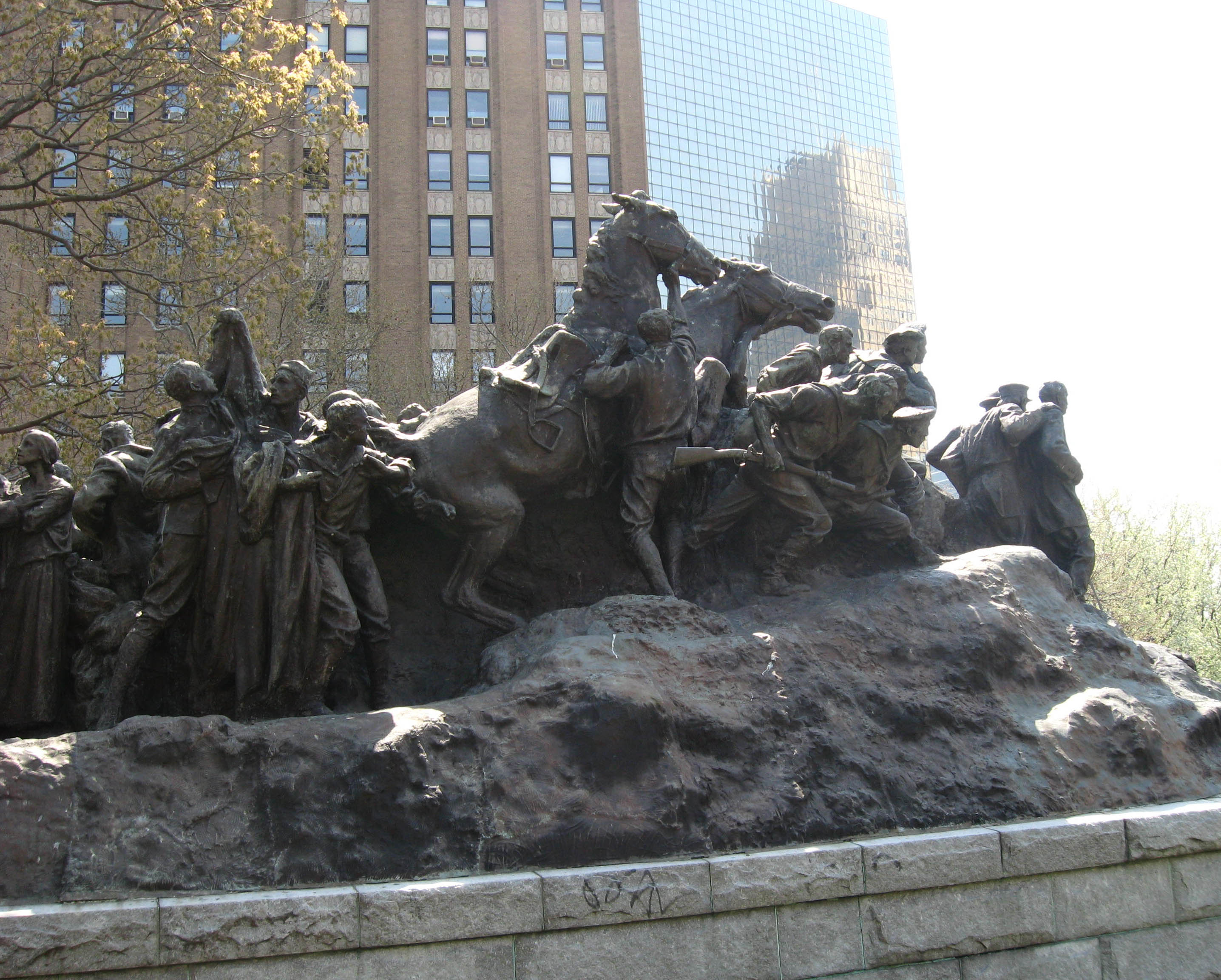
Wars of America
- Princeton
  - Princeton Battle Monument, by Frederick MacMonnies, Nassau Street, 1908–22.
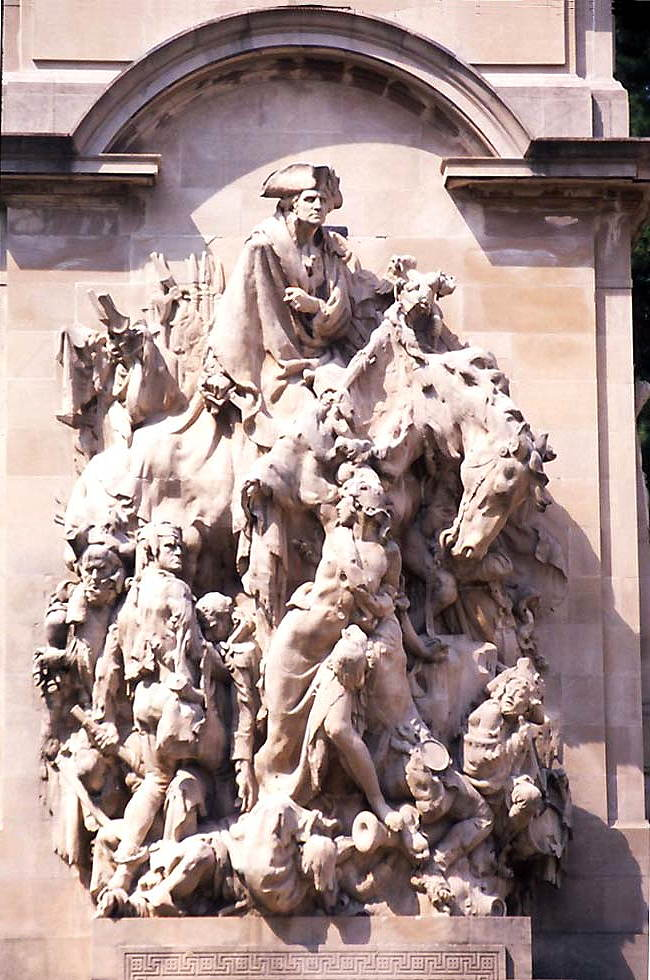
Battle Monument

=== New Mexico ===
- Alcalde
  - El Adelantado (Juan de Oñate Monument), by Reynaldo Rivera, Oñate Monument & Visitors Center, 1991–92. - Removed in 2020.
- Santa Fe
  - Journey's End (Don Diego de Peralta), by Reynaldo Rivera, Santa Fe Municipal Airport, 1989.
  - The Founding of Santa Fe (Pedro de Peralta), by Dave McGary, Grant Park, 1992.

=== New York ===
- Albany
  - General Philip Henry Sheridan Memorial, designed by John Quincy Adams Ward and completed by Daniel Chester French in 1916
- Buffalo
  - Francisco Pizarro Monument, by Charles Cary Rumsey, Albright-Knox Art Gallery, 1910, this cast 1920.
  - General Daniel Davidson Bidwell, by Sahl Swarz, Colonial Circle, 1952.
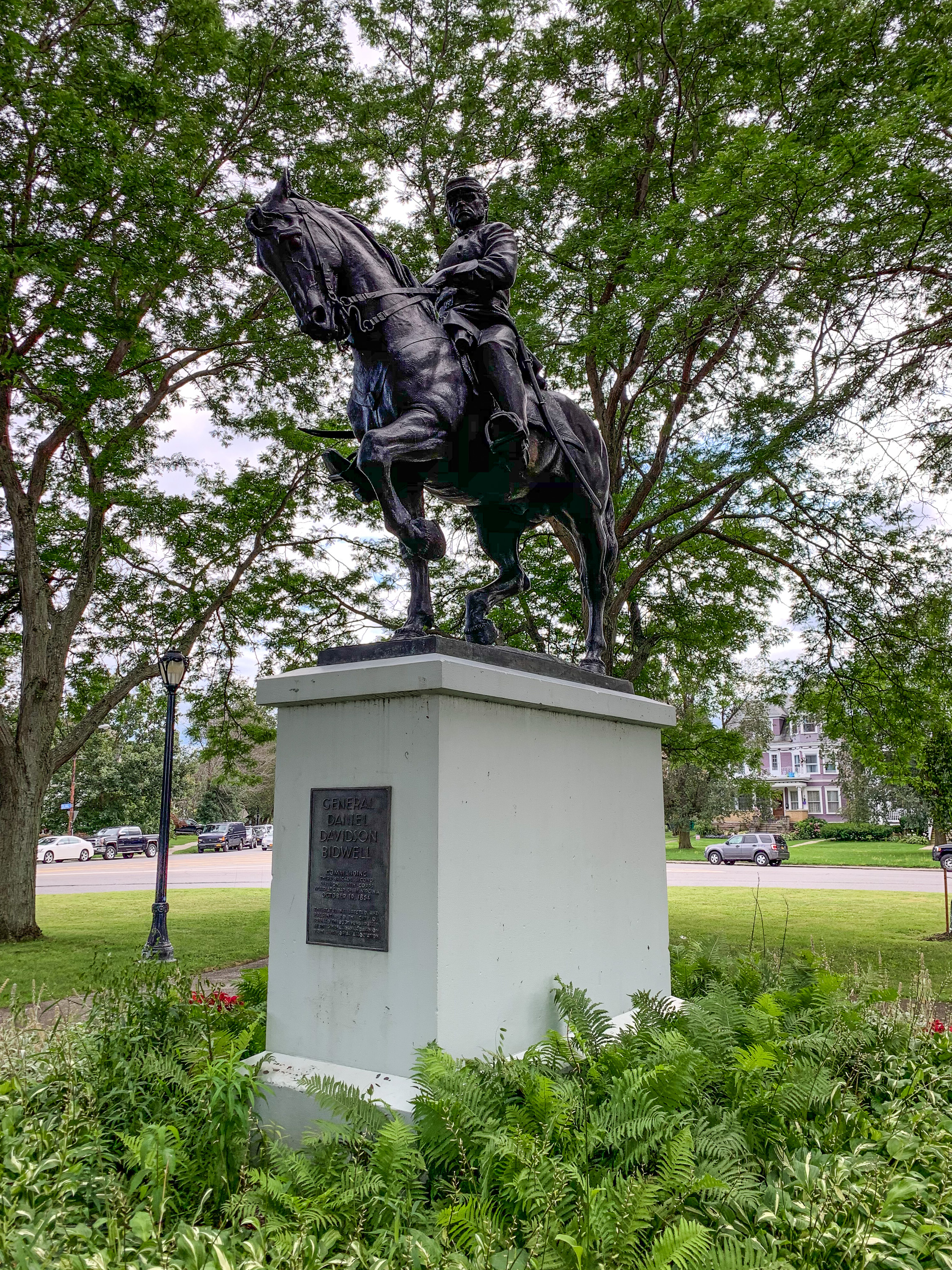
Bidwell
- Carmel
  - Sybil Ludington, by Anna Hyatt Huntington, Glenedia Lake, 1960–61.
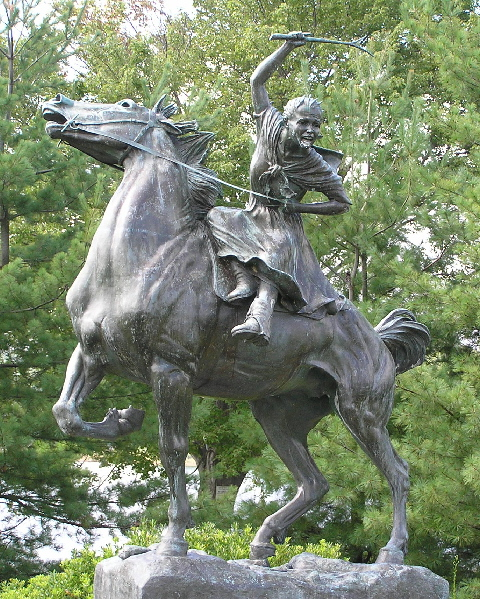
Sybil Ludington
- New York City
  - Manhattan
    - George III (destroyed), by Joseph Winton, raised in Bowling Green Park, 1770; melted down for musket balls, 1776. The statue's base and tail survive at the New York Historical Society.
    - George Washington, by Henry Kirke Brown and John Quincy Adams Ward, Union Square, 1856.
    - General William Tecumseh Sherman, by Augustus Saint-Gaudens, Central Park, Fifth Avenue at 59th Street, 1903.
    - Franz Sigel, by Karl Bitter, Riverside Park at 106th Street, 1907.
    - Joan of Arc, by Anna Hyatt Huntington, Riverside Park at 93rd Street, 1915.
    - Simón Bolívar, by Sally James Farnham, Central Park South at Avenue of the Americas, 1921.
    - El Cid, by Anna Hyatt Huntington, Hispanic Society of America, 1927.
    - King Jagiello Monument, by Stanislaw Kazimierz Ostowski, Central Park, pre-1939.
    - Theodore Roosevelt, by James Earle Fraser, American Museum of Natural History, Central Park West, 1940.
    - Don Quichote, by Anna Hyatt Huntington, Hispanic Society of America, 1942.
    - Peace, by Antun Augustinčić, United Nations Gardens, 1954.
    - José Martí, by Anna Hyatt Huntington, Central Park, 1965.
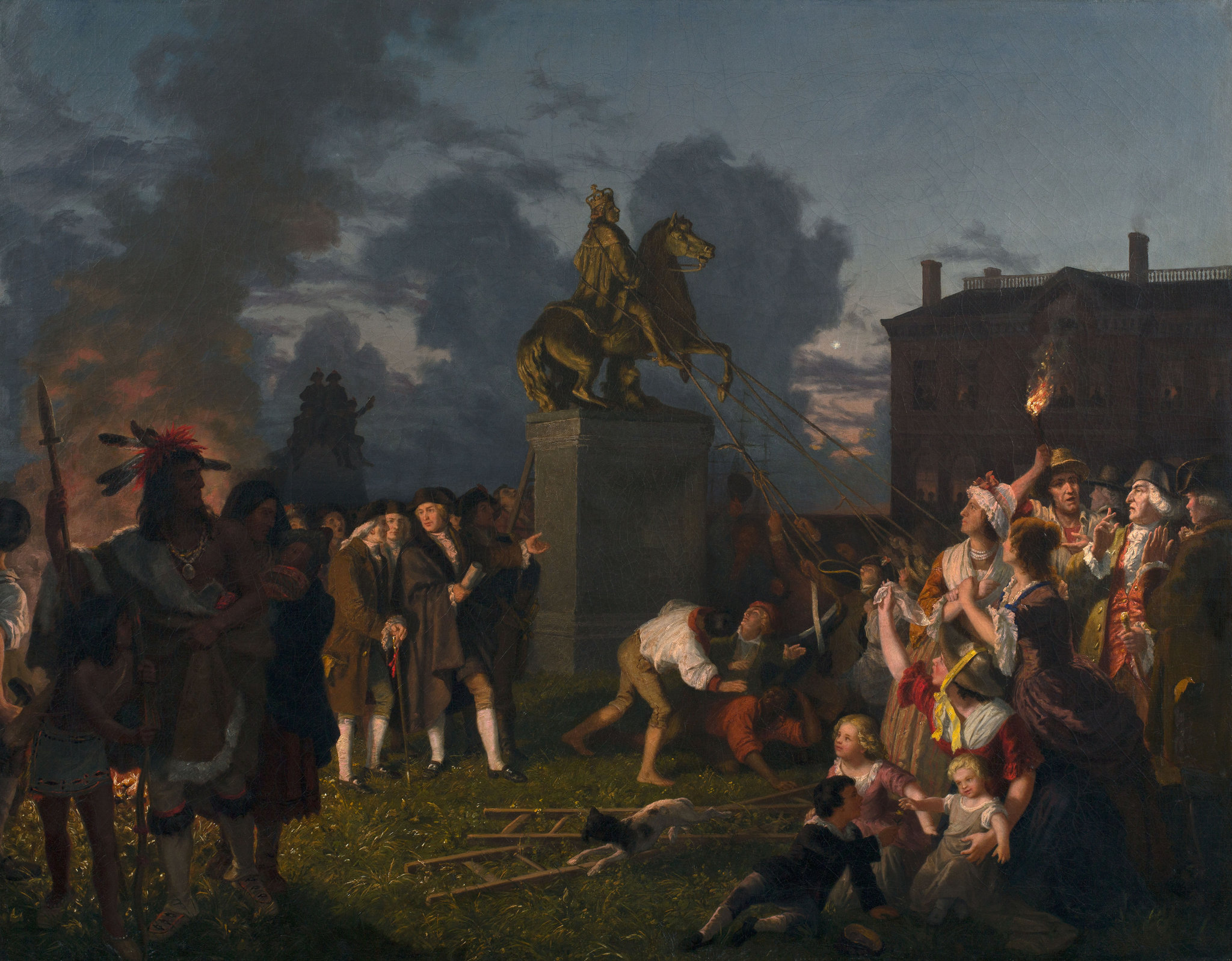
Pulling Down the Statue of King George III, 1859 painting by J. Oertel.

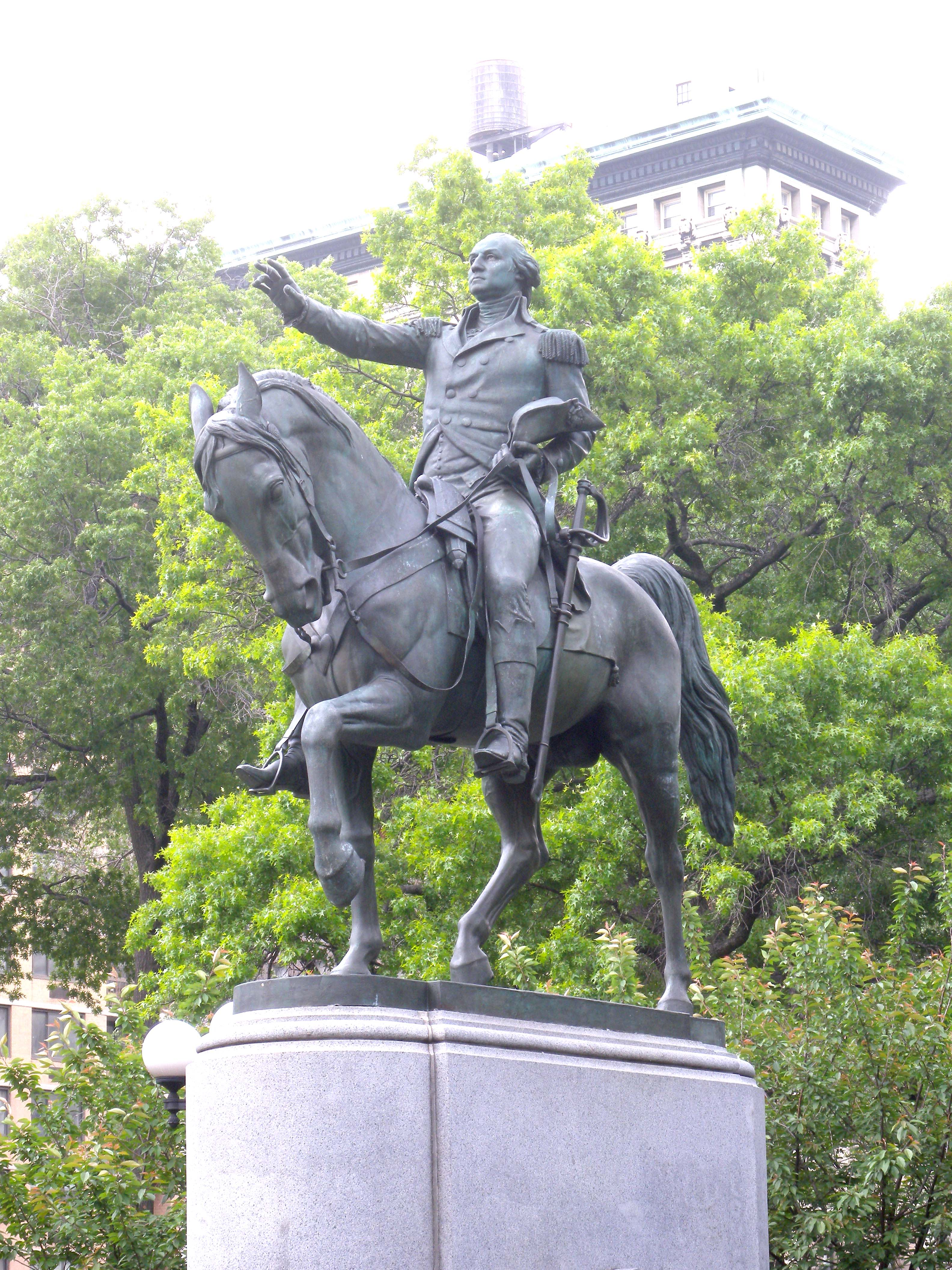
Washington

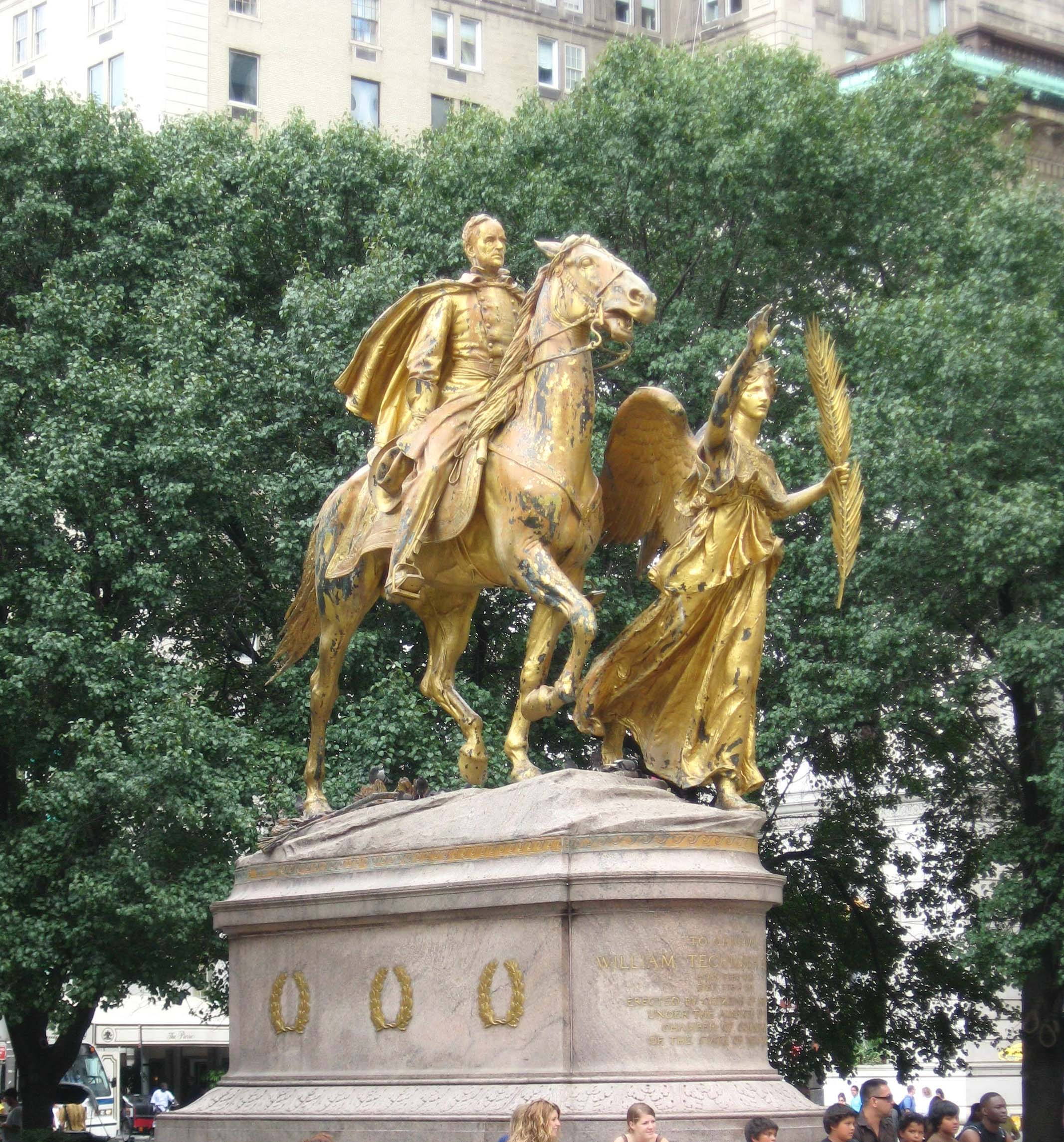
Sherman

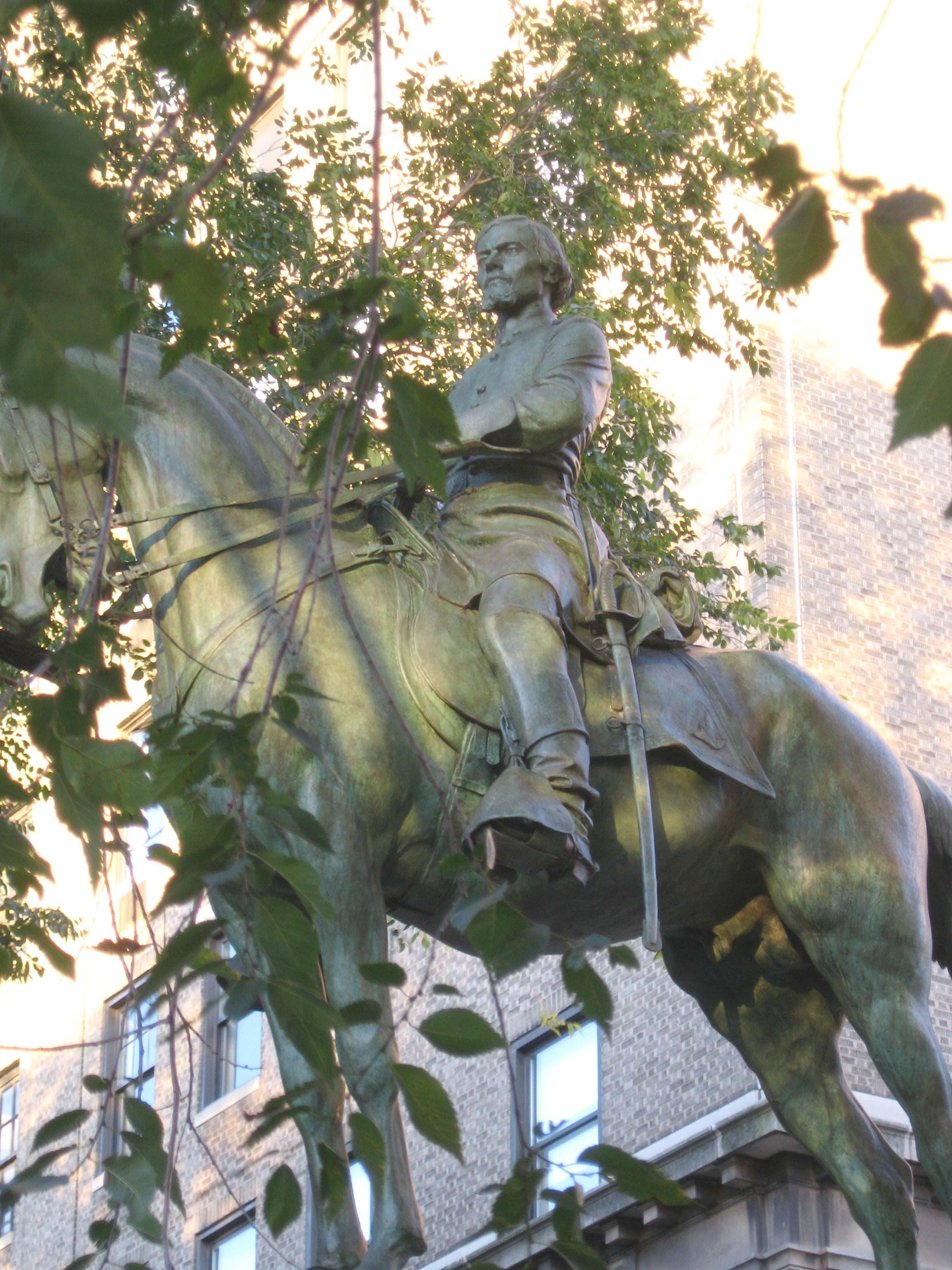
Sigel

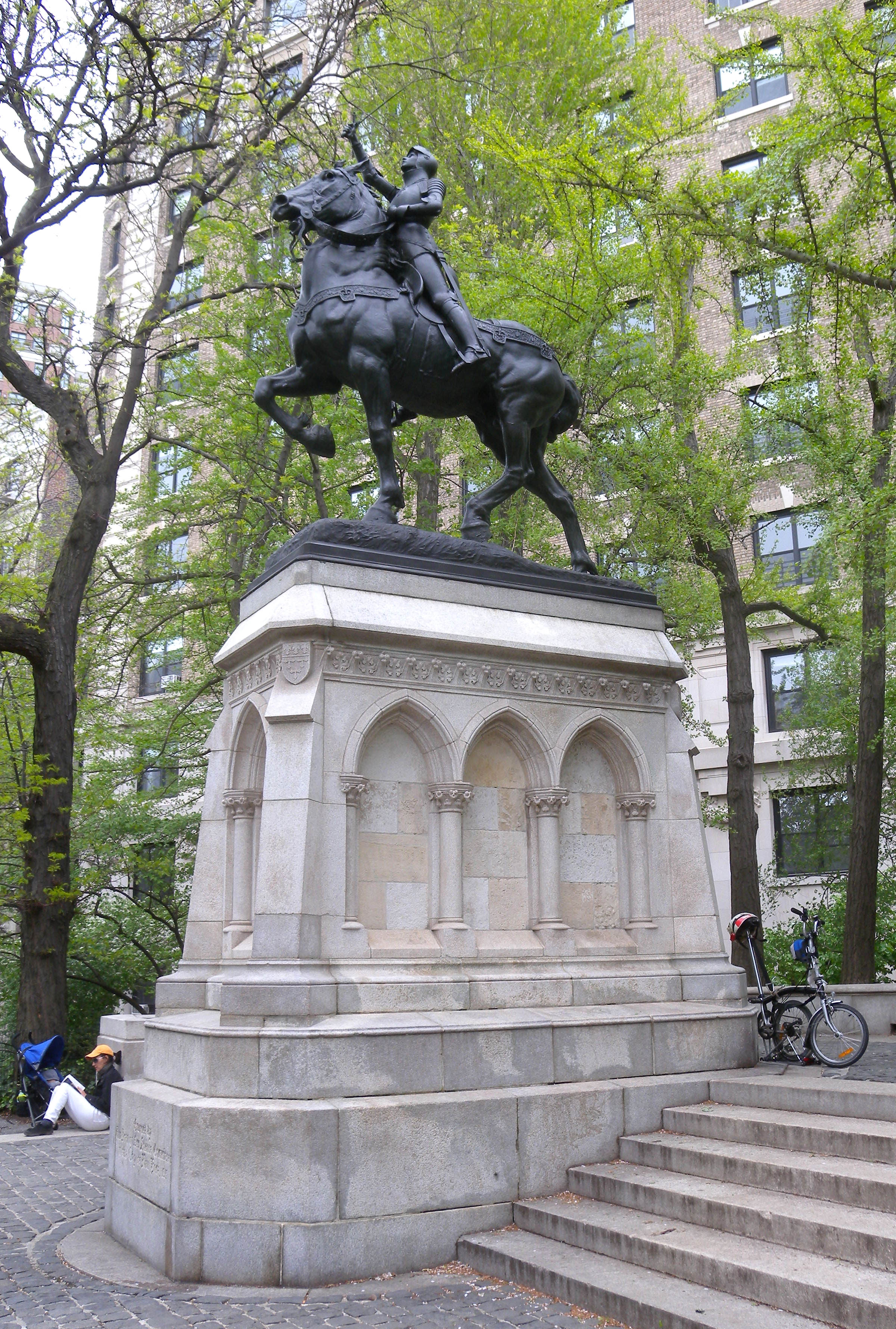
Joan of Arc

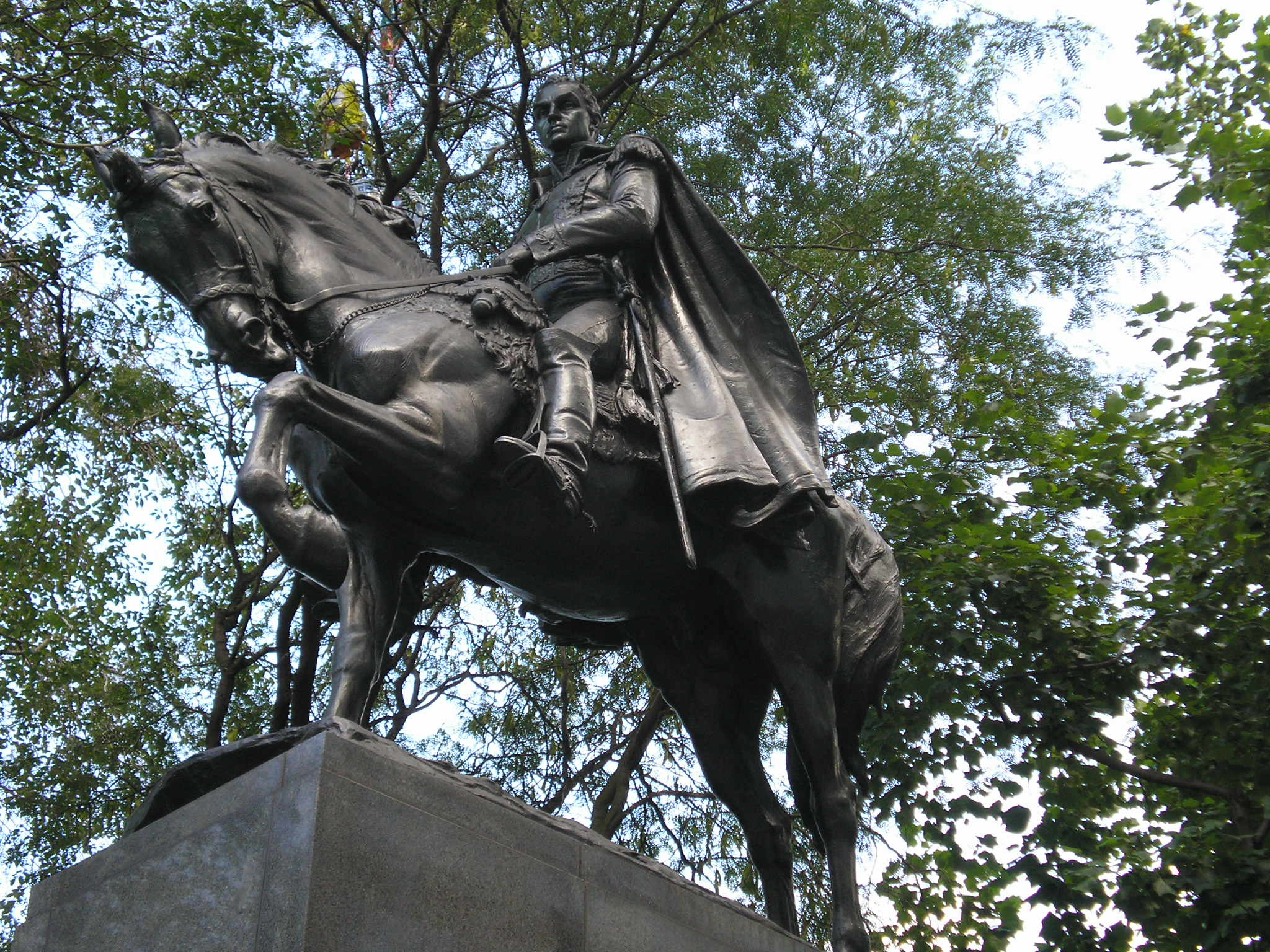
Bolivar

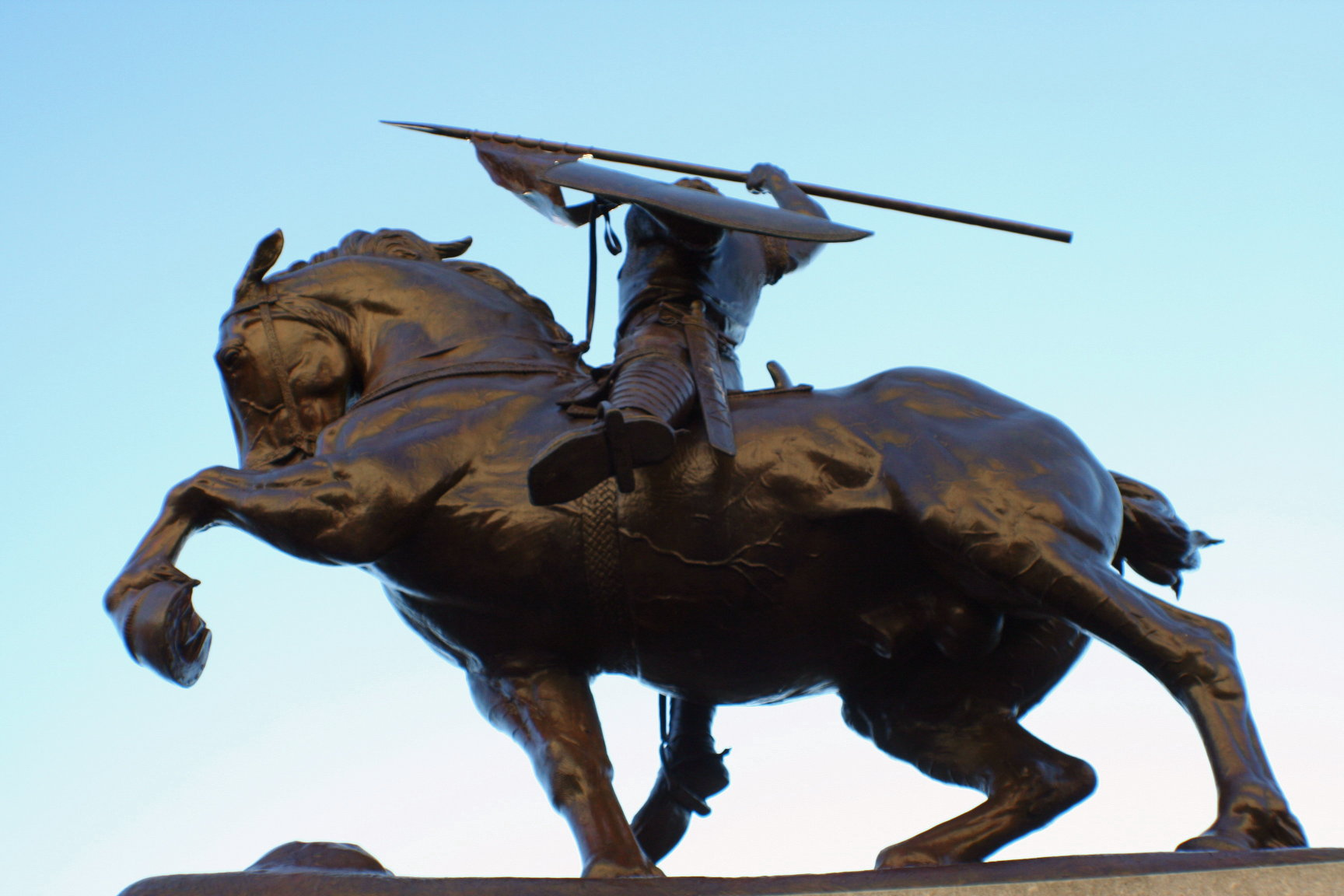
El Cid

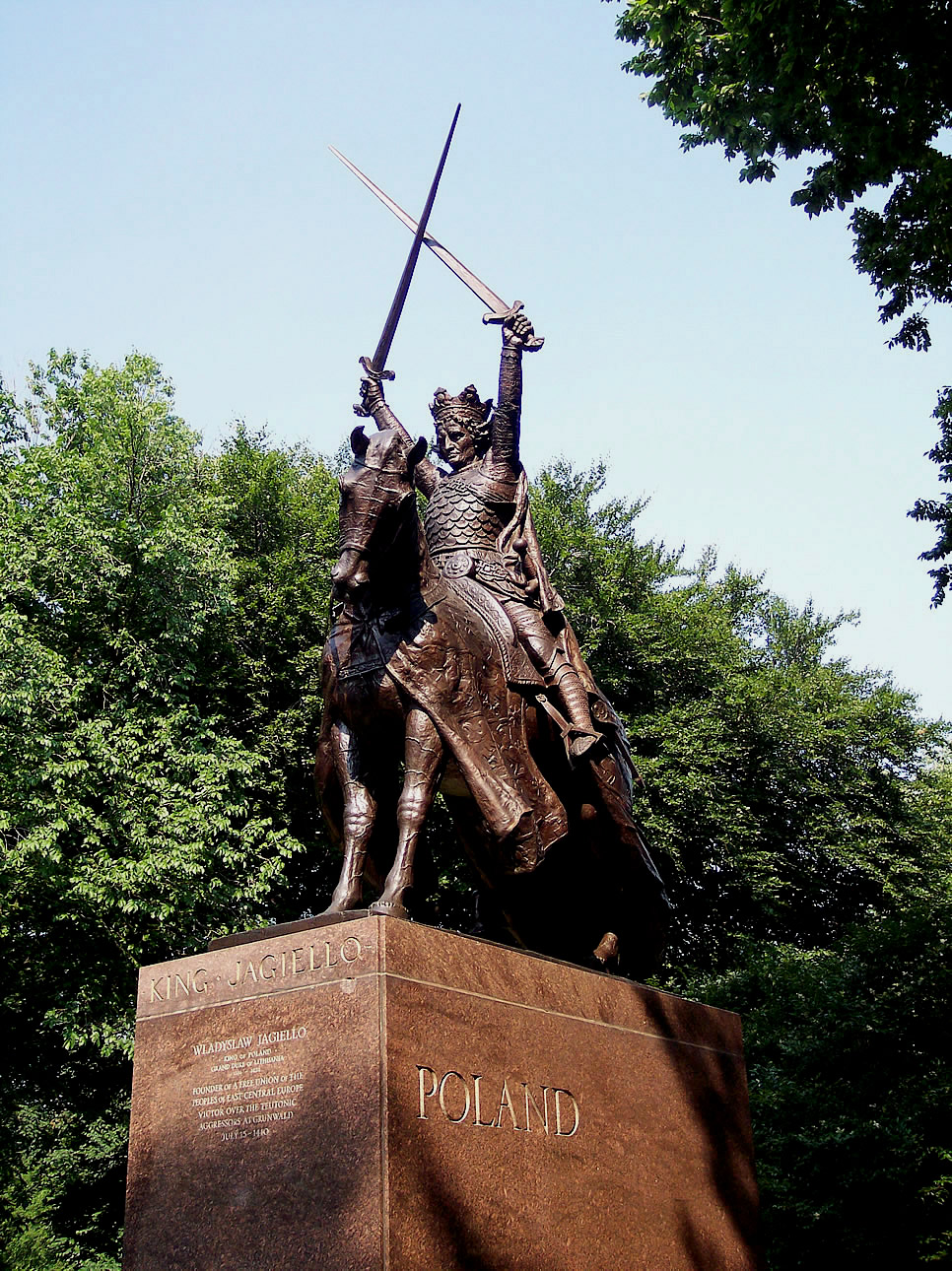
King Jagiello

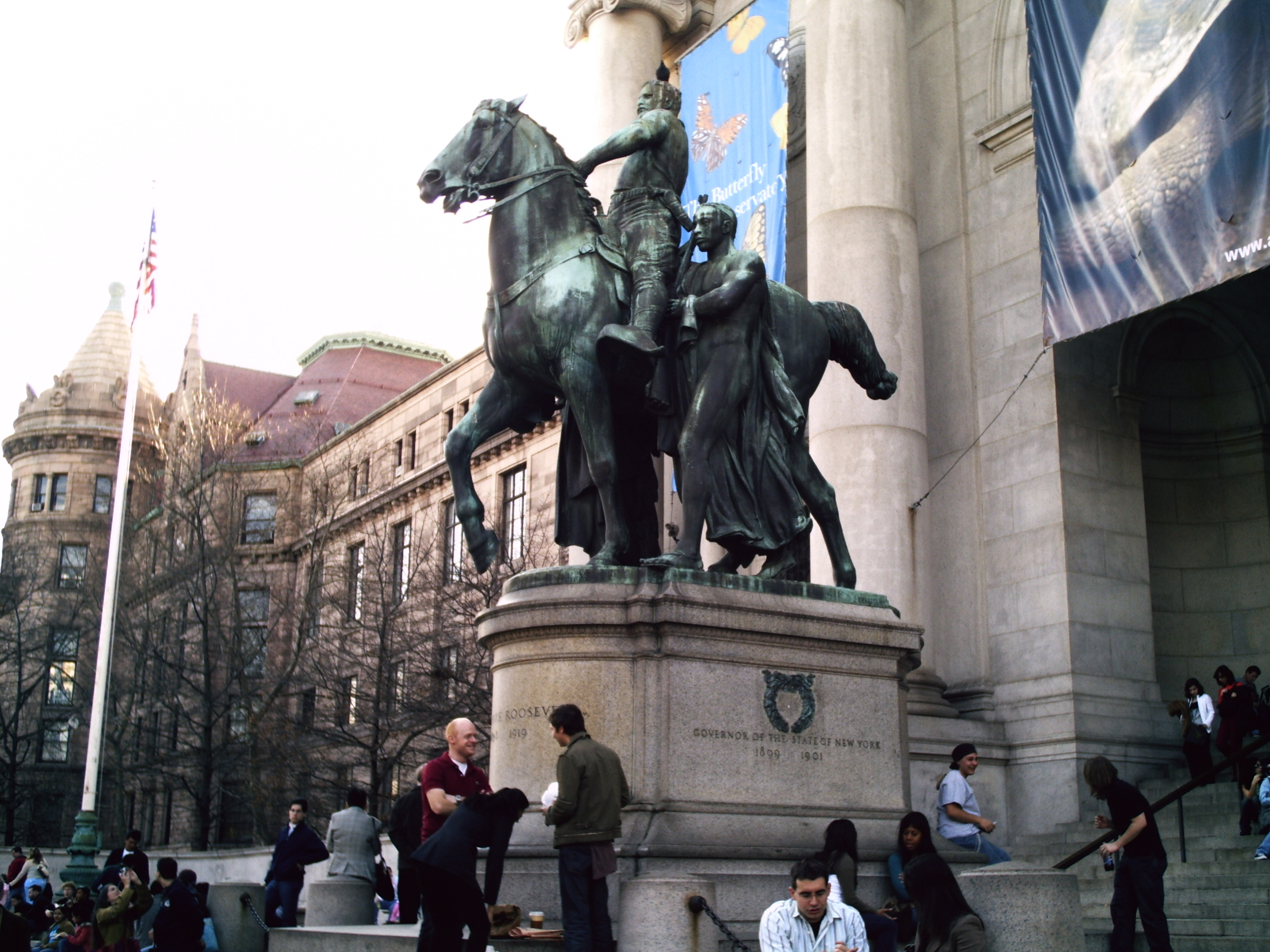
Roosevelt

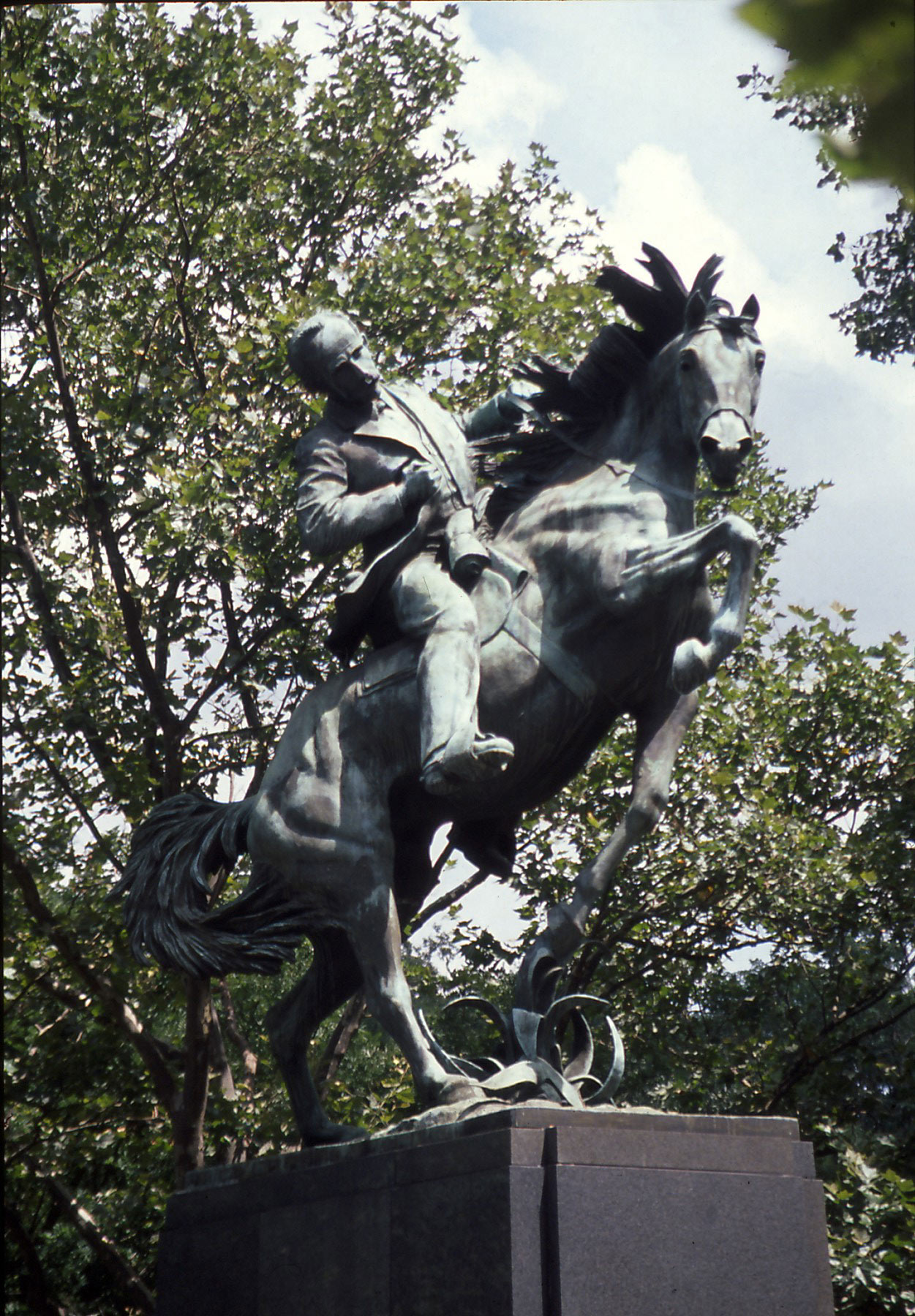
Marti
  - Brooklyn
    - Bas-relief of Abraham Lincoln, by William R. O'Donovan (Lincoln) and Thomas Eakins (horse), Soldiers' and Sailors' Arch, Grand Army Plaza, 1892.
    - Bas-relief of Ulysses S. Grant, by William R. O'Donovan (Grant) and Thomas Eakins (horse), Soldiers' and Sailors' Arch, Grand Army Plaza, 1892.
    - Columbia (Quadriga), by Frederick MacMonnies, Soldiers' and Sailors' Arch, Grand Army Plaza, 1894–98.
    - General Grant, by William Ordway Partridge, Grant Square, 1896.
    - The Horse Tamers, by Frederick MacMonnies, Prospect Park, 1899.
    - General Henry Warner Slocum, by Frederick MacMonnies, Grand Army Plaza, 1905.
    - Washington at Valley Forge, by Henry Shrady, Continental Army Plaza, 1906.
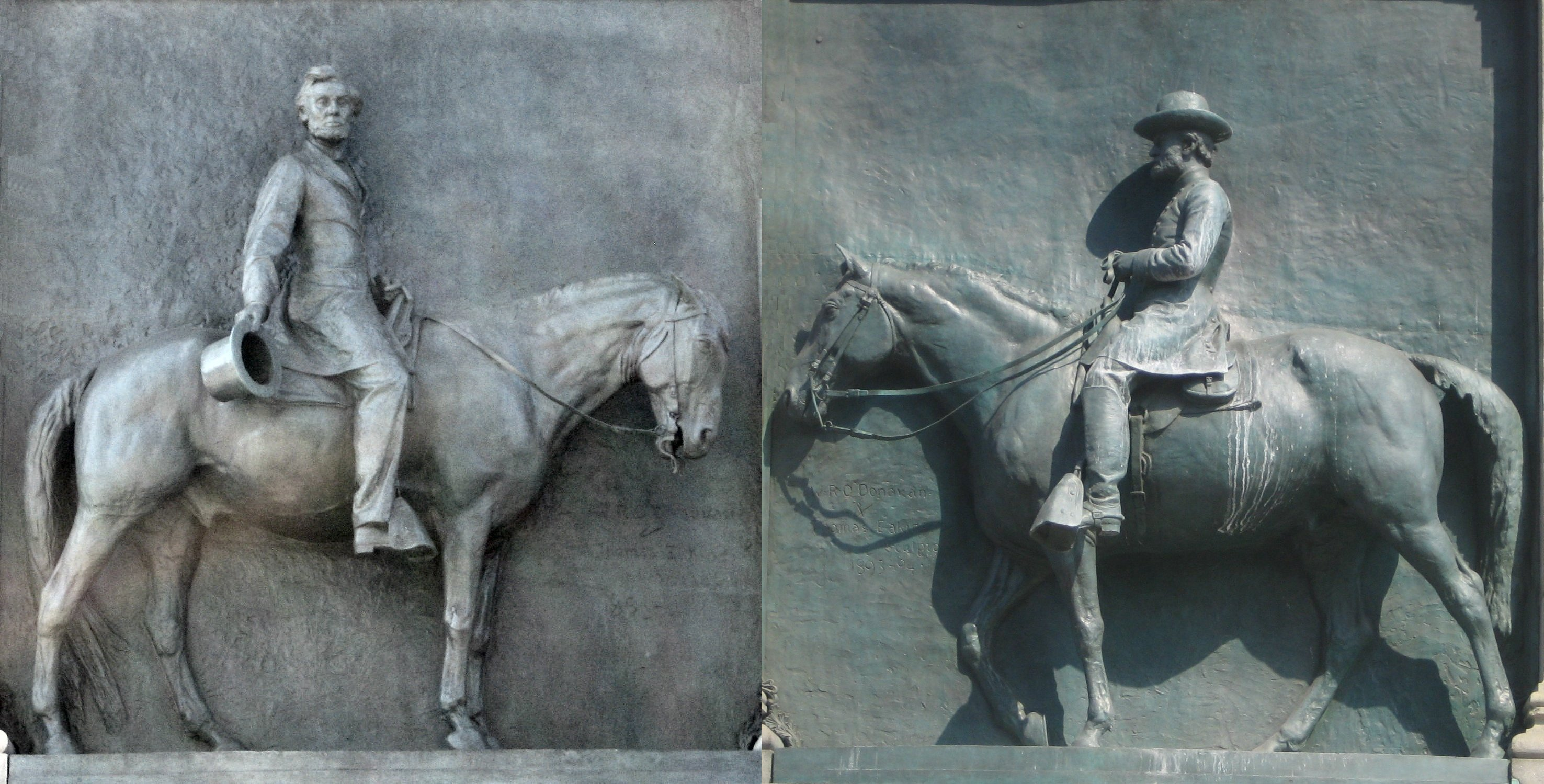
Lincoln & Grant

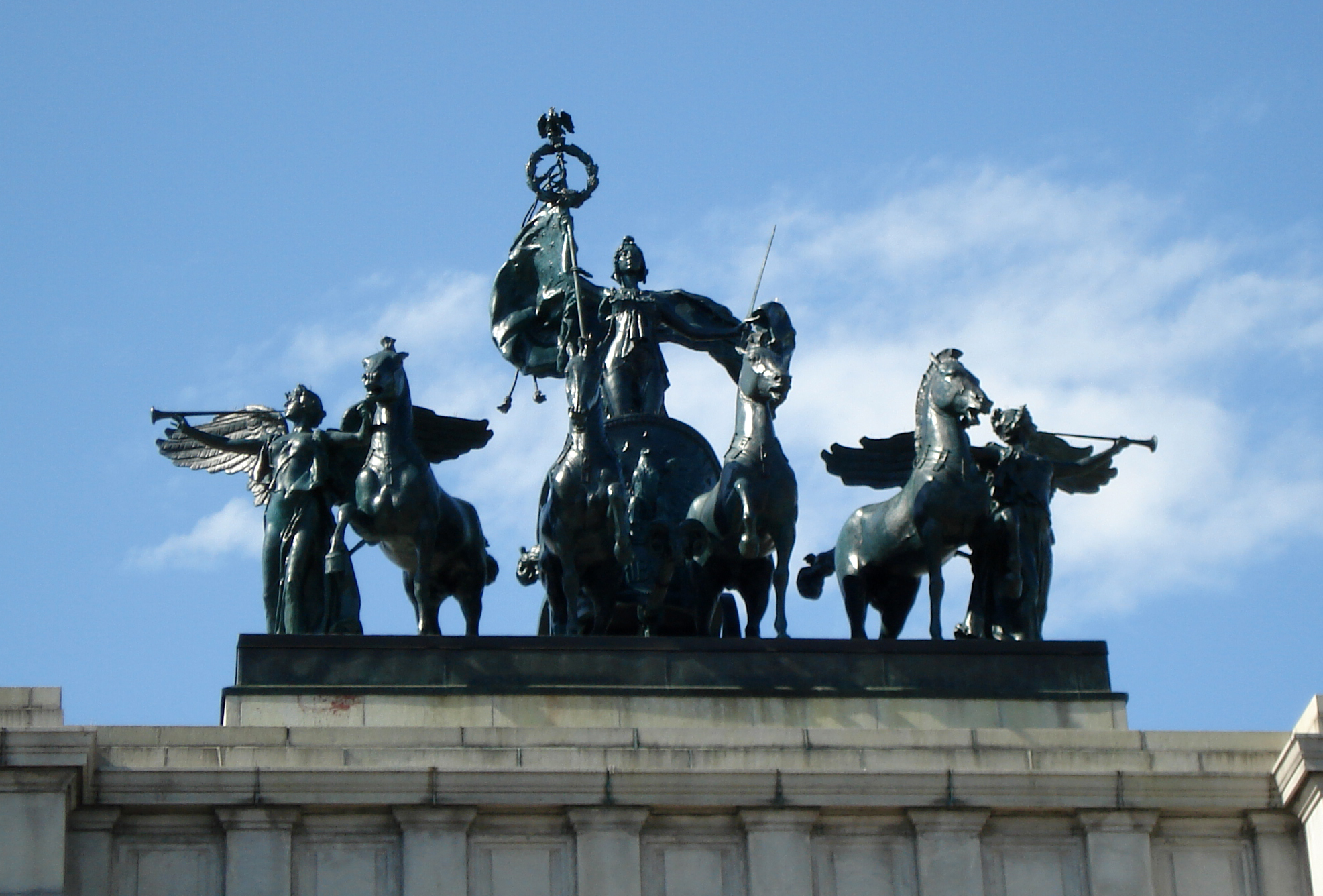
Columbia Quadriga

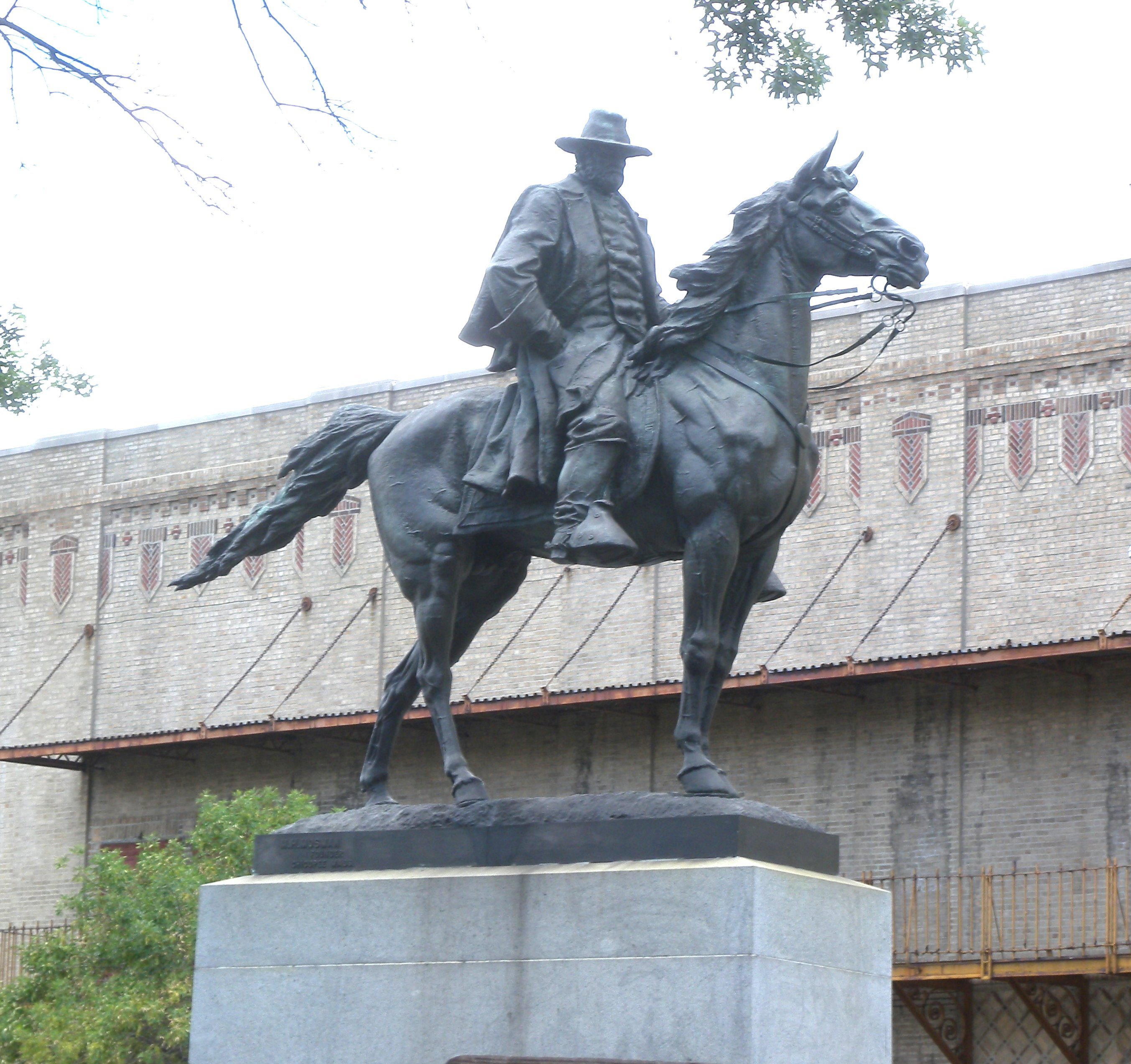
Grant by Partridge

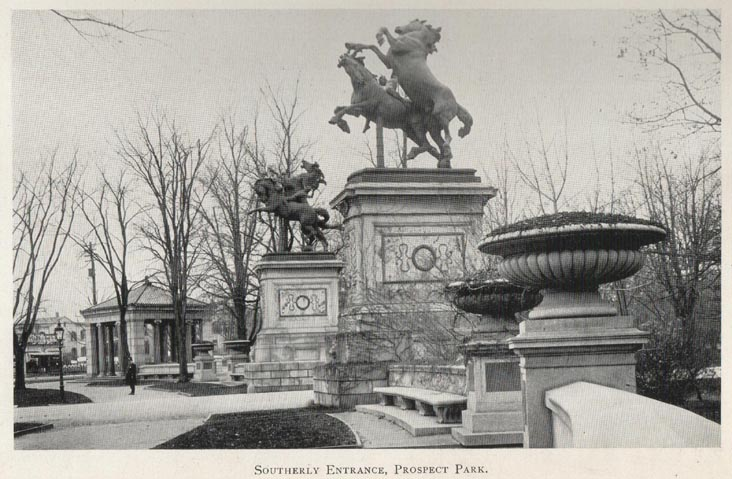
The Horse Tamers

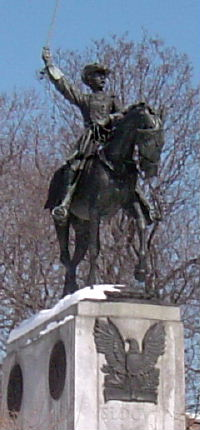
Slocum

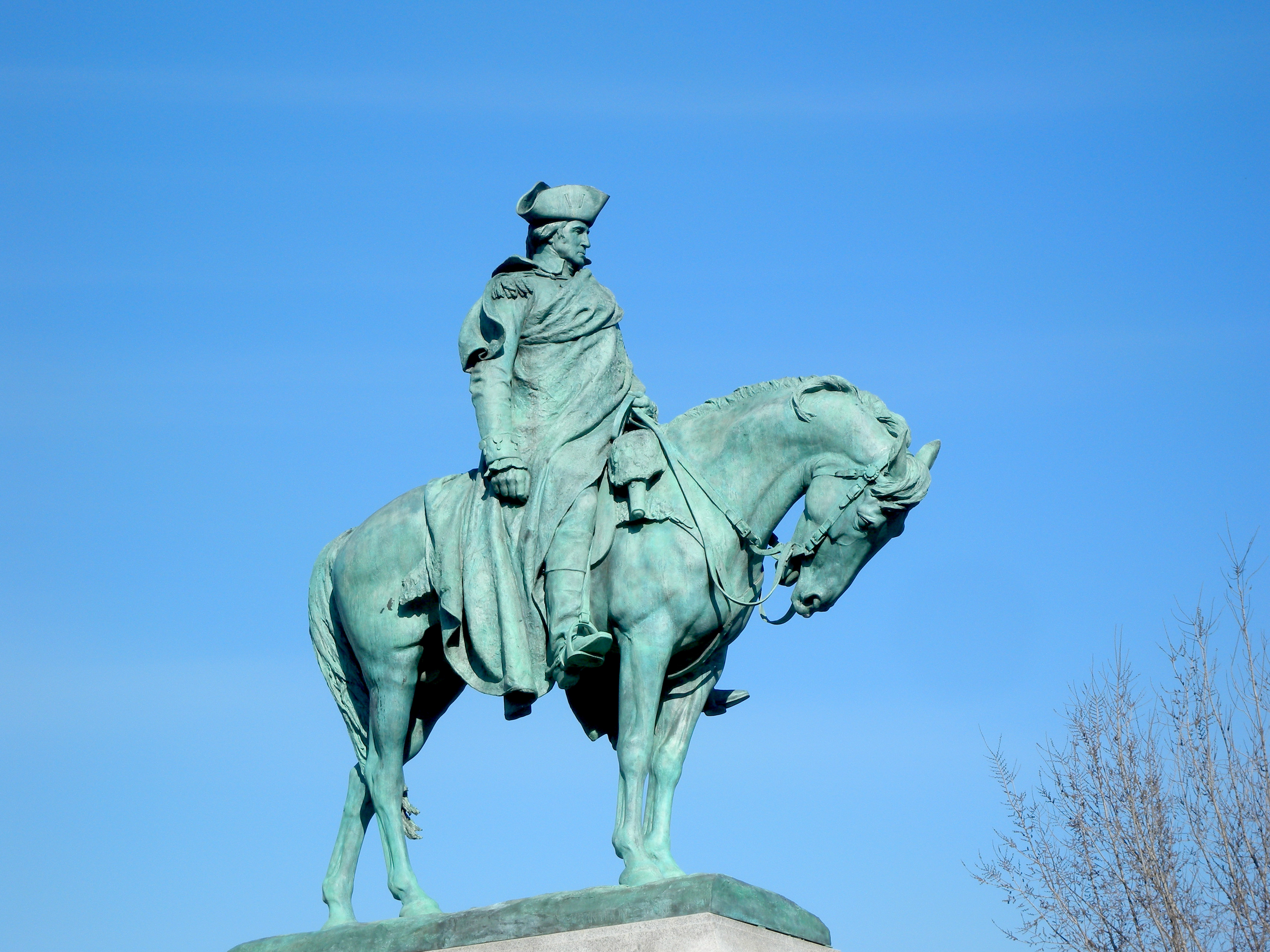
Washington
- Oyster Bay
  - Theodore Roosevelt, by Alexander Phimister Proctor, Berry Hill Road & South Street, 1921, this cast 2005. A replica of Proctor's statue in Portland, Oregon.
- Syracuse
  - General Gustavus Sniper, by Frederick Moynihan, Schlosser Park, 1904–05.
  - Bas-relief panels of The Call to Arms and Mending the Flag, by Cyrus Edwin Dallin, Soldiers' and Sailors' Monument, Clinton Square, 1909–10.
  - Young Abe Lincoln, by Anna Hyatt Huntington, Syracuse University, 1961, this cast 1963.
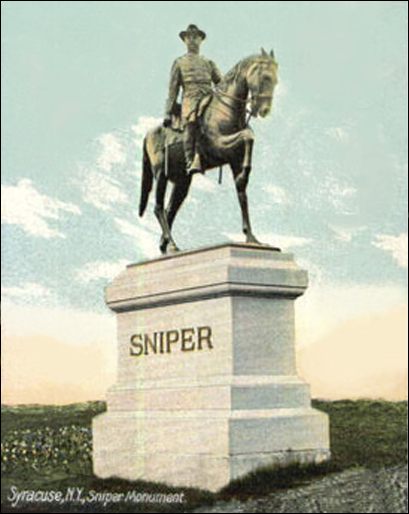
Sniper

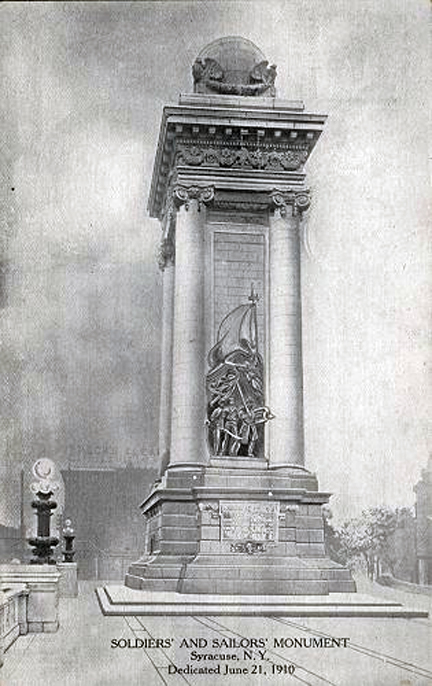
Soldiers' and Sailors' Monument
- West Point
  - Washington Monument (West Point), by Henry Kirke Brown, United States Military Academy, 1856, this cast 1916. A replica of Brown's statue in Union Square, New York City.
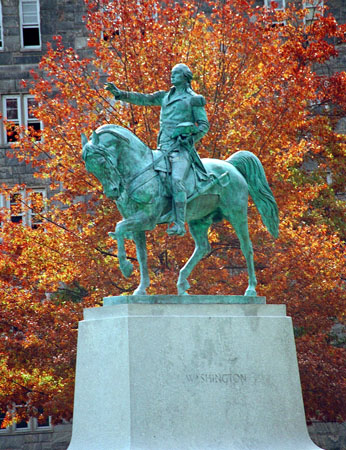
Washington Monument

=== North Carolina ===
- Greensboro
  - Nathanael Greene Monument, by Francis Herman Packer, Guilford Courthouse National Military Park, 1913–15.
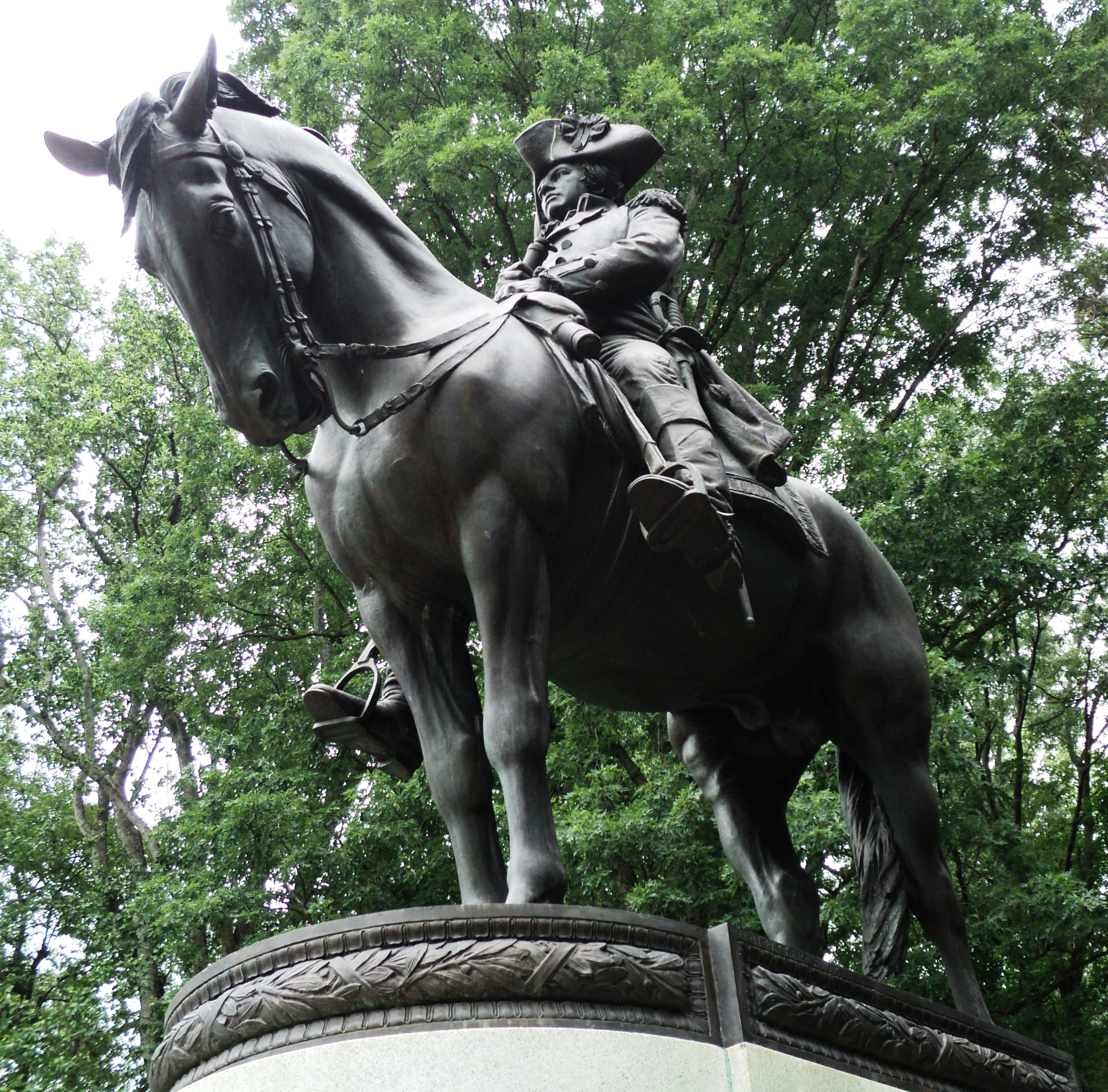
Greene
- Raleigh
  - Presidents North Carolina Gave the Nation (James Polk, Andrew Jackson, Andrew Johnson), by Charles Keck, North Carolina State Capitol, Raleigh, North Carolina, 1948.
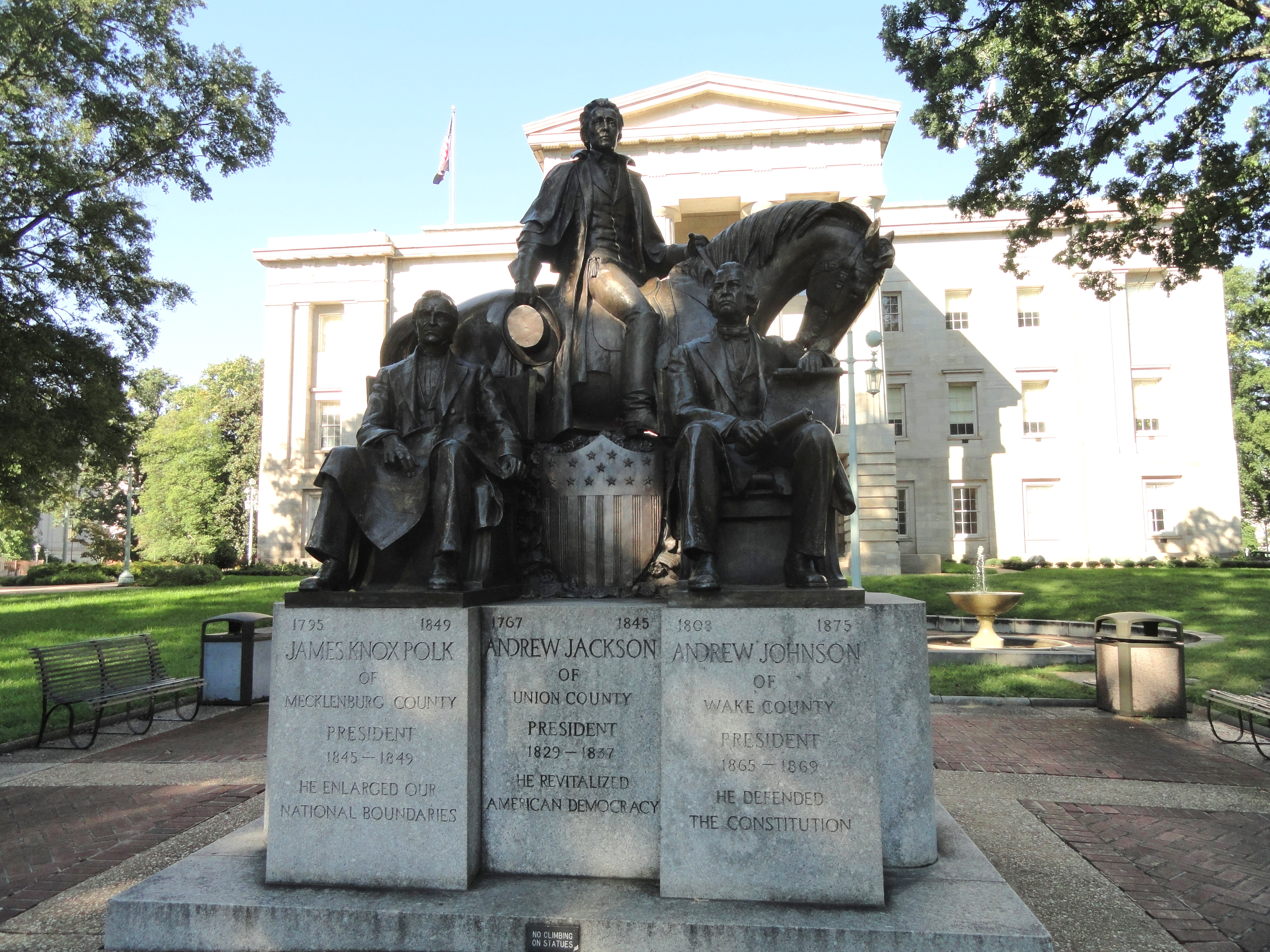

=== North Dakota ===
- Bismarck
  - Theodore Roosevelt, by Alexander Phimister Proctor, State Historical Society of North Dakota, 1922. The full-size plaster model for Proctor's statues in Portland, Oregon and Minot, North Dakota.
- Mandan
  - Theodore Roosevelt, by Alexander Phimister Proctor, 3rd Avenue & Main Street, 1924. A smaller version of Proctor's statue in Portland, Oregon.
- Minot
  - Theodore Roosevelt, by Alexander Phimister Proctor, Roosevelt Park, 1922, this cast 1924. A replica of Proctor's statue in Portland, Oregon.
- Regent
  - Theodore Roosevelt Rides Again, by Gary Greff, Enchanted Highway, Regency-Gladstone Road, 1993. A 51-foot-tall cartoon outlined in metal pipe depicting Roosevelt astride a rearing horse.

=== Ohio ===
- Cincinnati
  - President William Henry Harrison, by Louis Rebisso, Piatt Park, 1895–96.
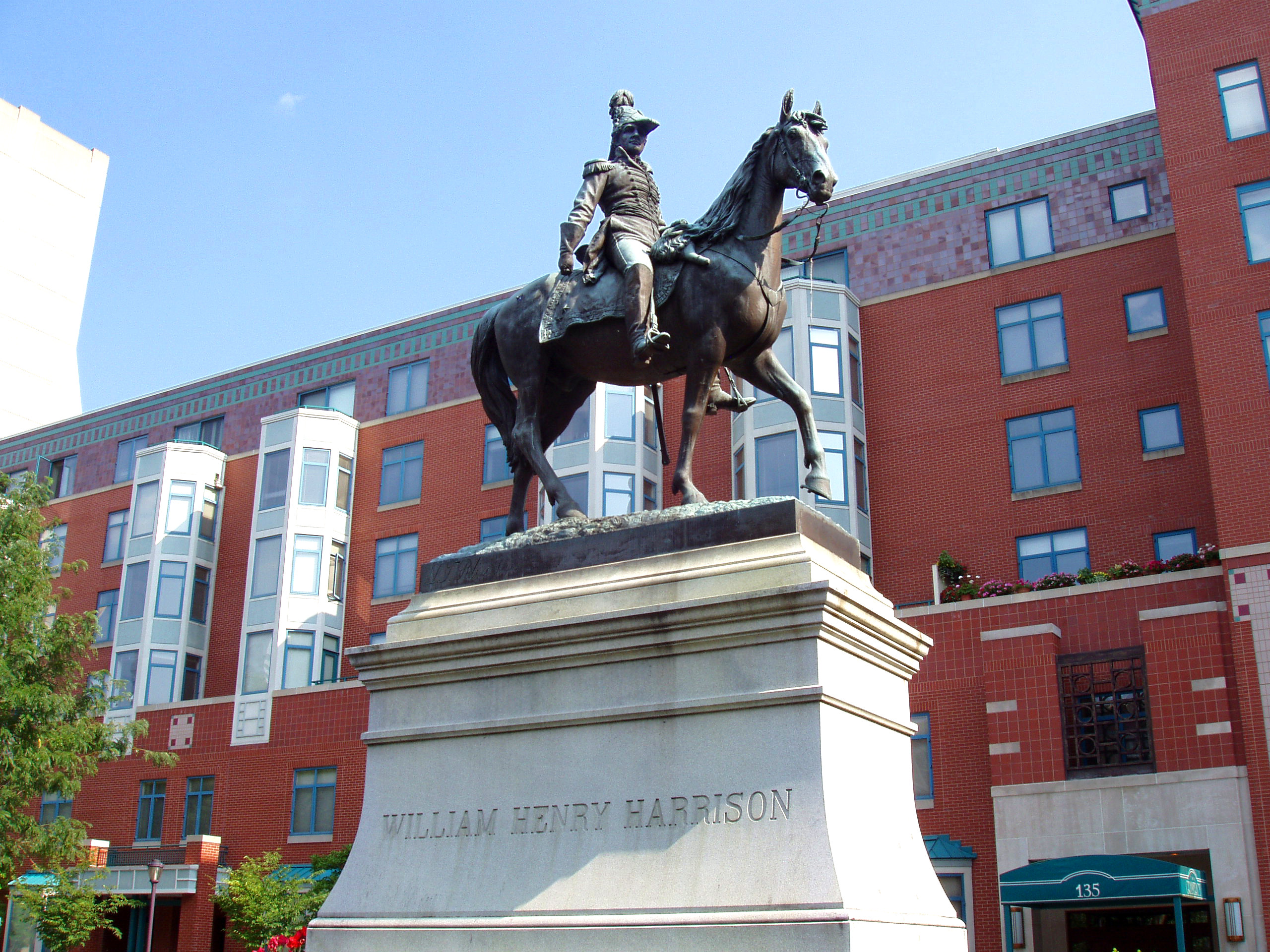
Harrison
- Dayton
  - John Henry Patterson Monument by Giuseppe Moretti, Hills and Dales Park, 1925–28.
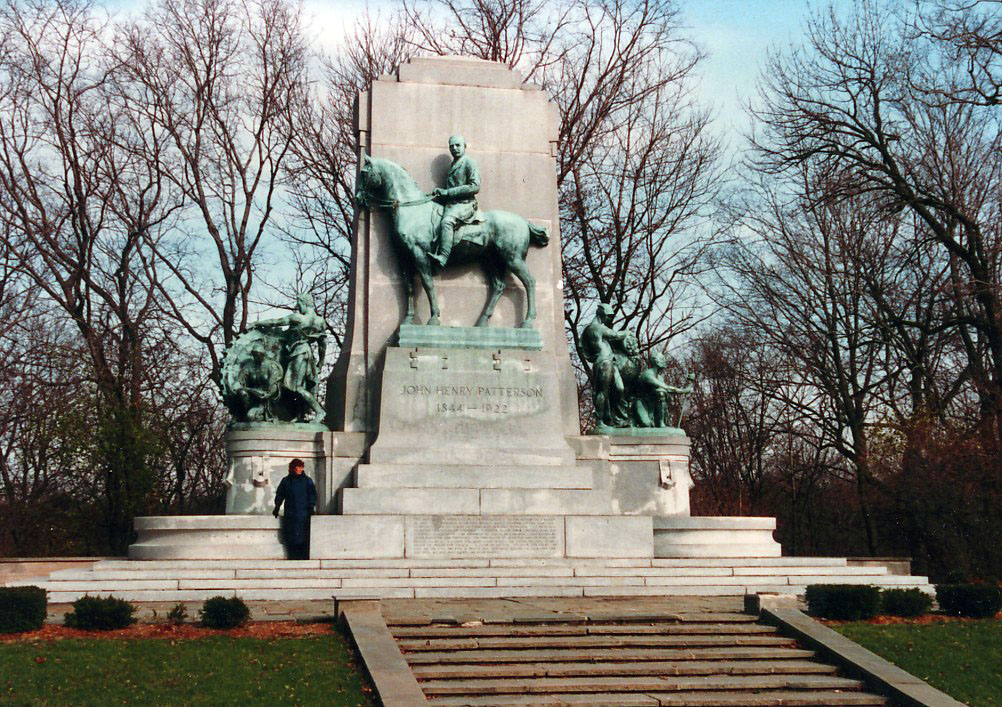
Patterson

=== Oklahoma ===
- Claremore
  - Riding Into the Sunset (Will Rogers), by Electra Waggoner Biggs, Will Rogers Memorial, 1941–50.
  - George Washington, by Yon Sim Pak, Rogers State University, 1987.
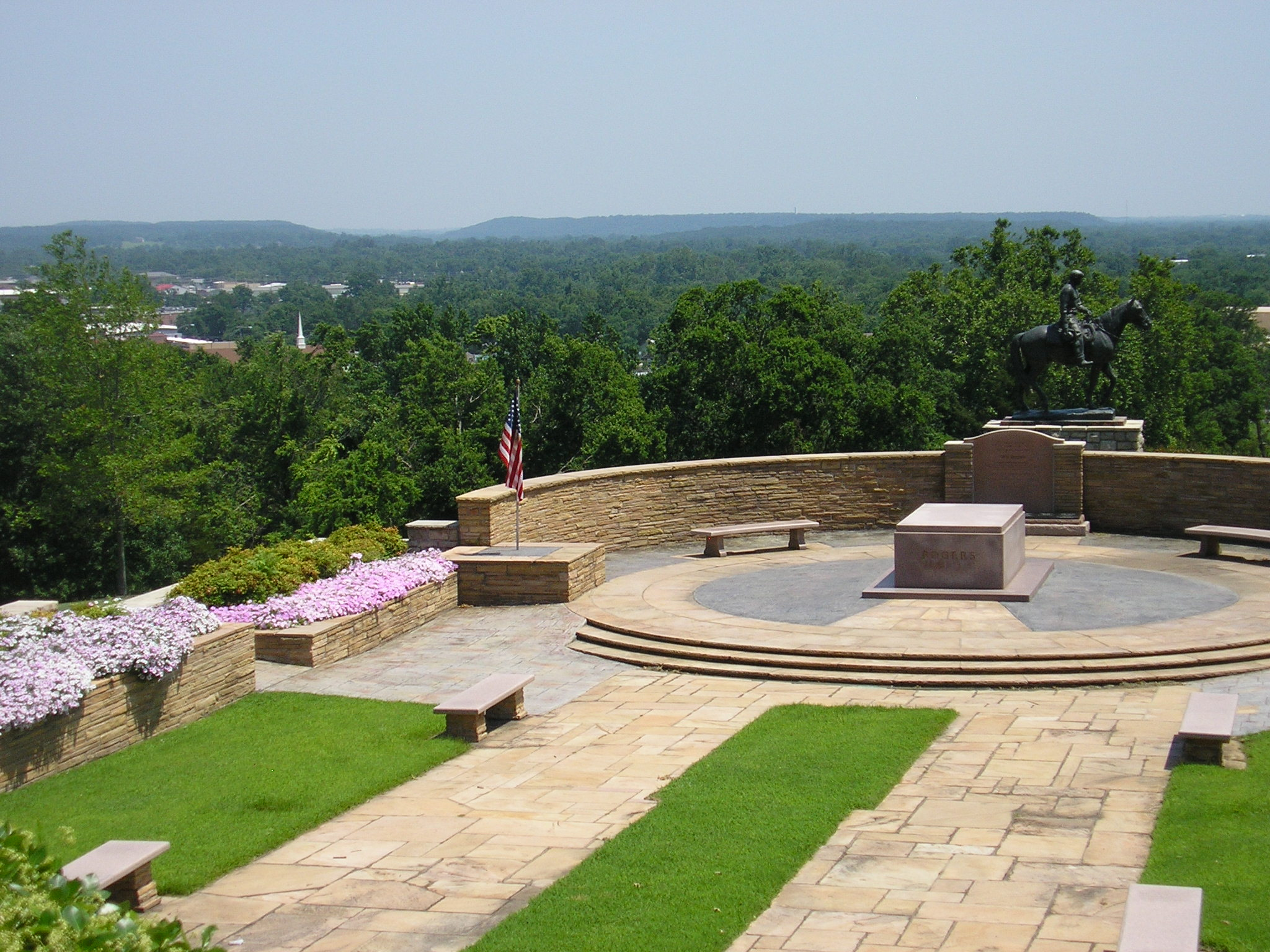
Will Rogers Tomb.
- Oklahoma City
  - Tribute to Range Riders, by Constance Whitney Warren, Oklahoma State Capitol, 1926–29.
- Stillwater
  - The OSU Spirit Rider, by Jim L. Hamilton, Oklahoma State University, 1994.
- Tulsa
  - Appeal to the Great Spirit (smaller version in plaster), by Cyrus Edwin Dallin, Central High School, ca. 1922. This plaster example was used to cast a bronze version in 1985.
  - Appeal to the Great Spirit (smaller version in bronze), by Cyrus Edwin Dallin, Woodward Park, ca. 1922, this cast 1985.
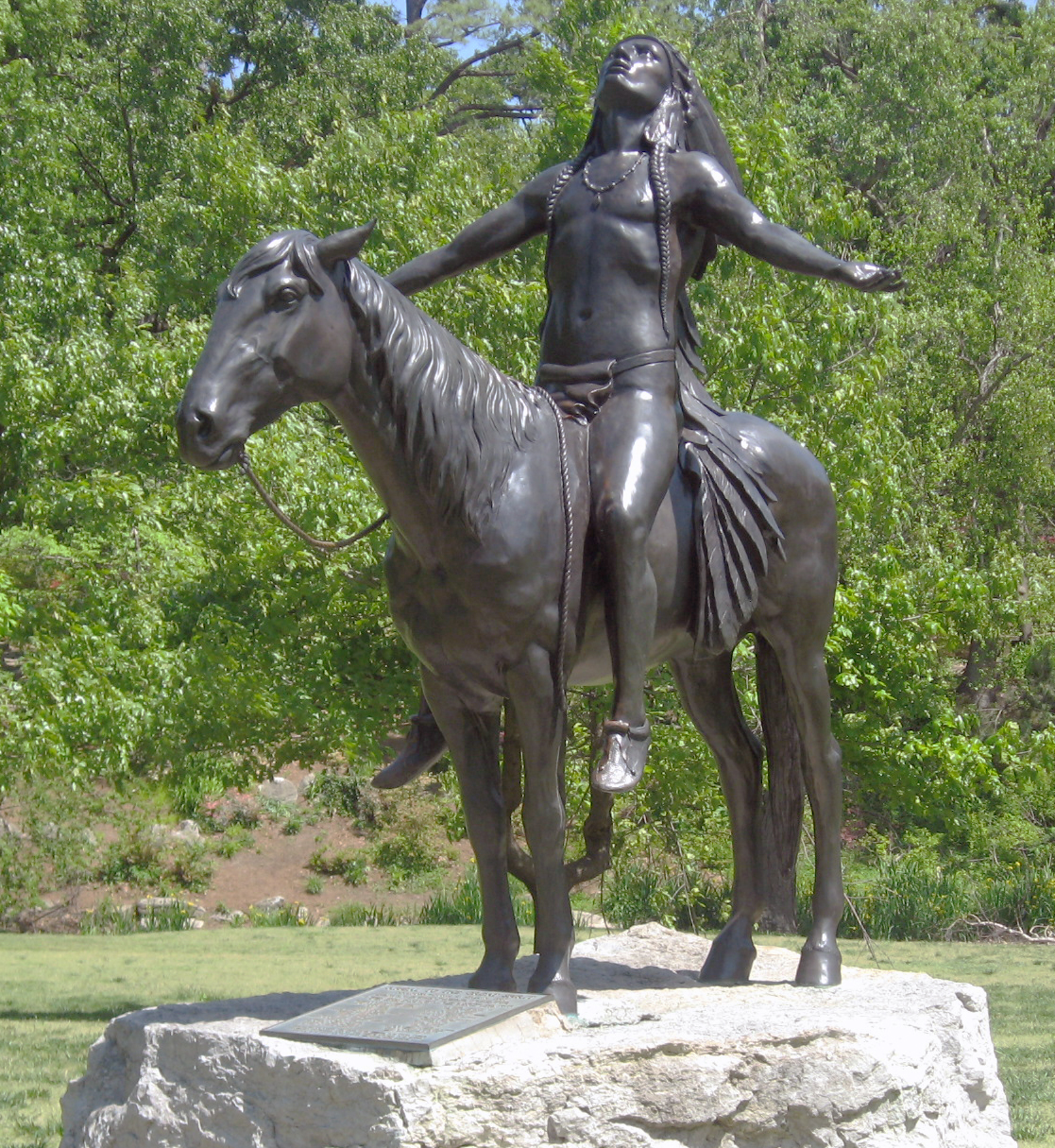
Appeal to the Great Spirit

=== Oregon ===
- Lincoln City
  - Abraham Lincoln on Horseback (Young Abe Lincoln), by Anna Hyatt Huntington, 22nd Street & Quay Avenue, 1961, this cast 1965.
- Portland
  - Joan of Arc, by Emmanuel Frémiet, Coe Circle, Laurelhurst, 1890, this cast 1924.
  - Theodore Roosevelt, Rough Rider, by Alexander Phimister Proctor, South Park Blocks, 1922.
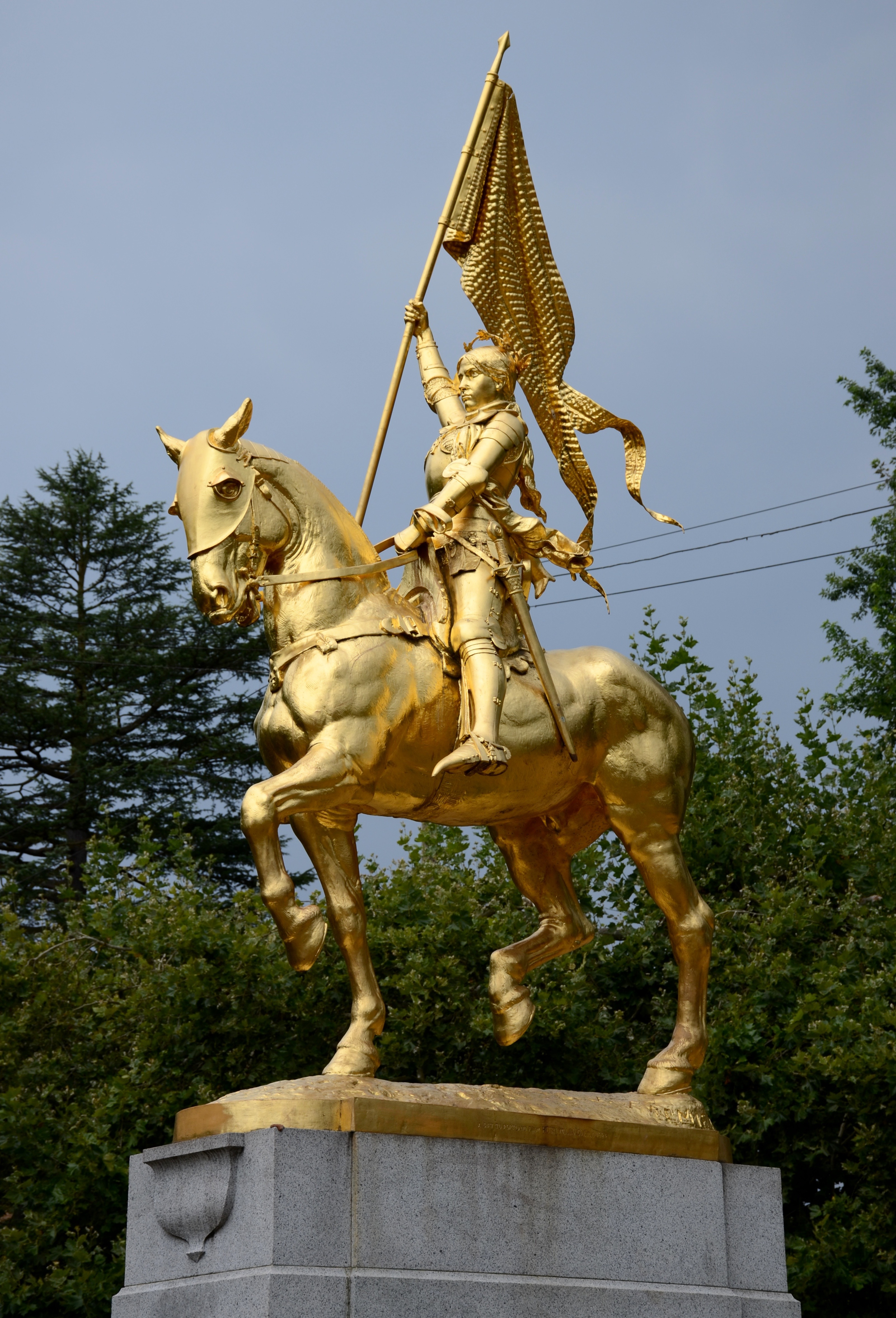
Joan of Arc

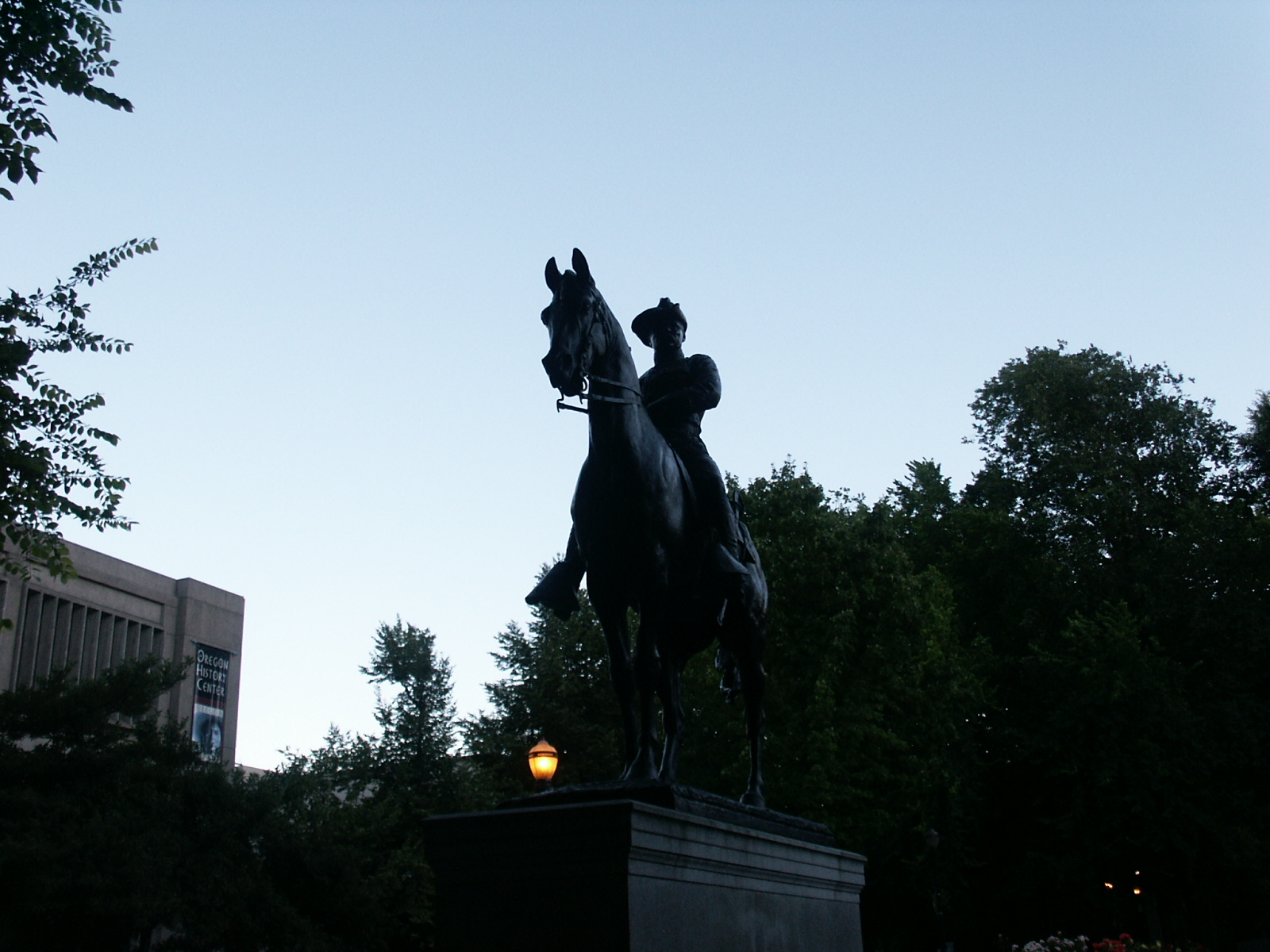
Roosevelt
- Salem
  - The Circuit Rider, by Alexander Phimister Proctor, Oregon State Capitol, 1922–23.
  - Lewis and Clark Memorial, by Leo Friedlander, Oregon State Capitol, 1934.
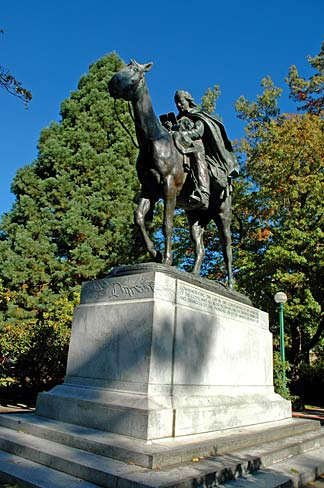
Circuit Rider

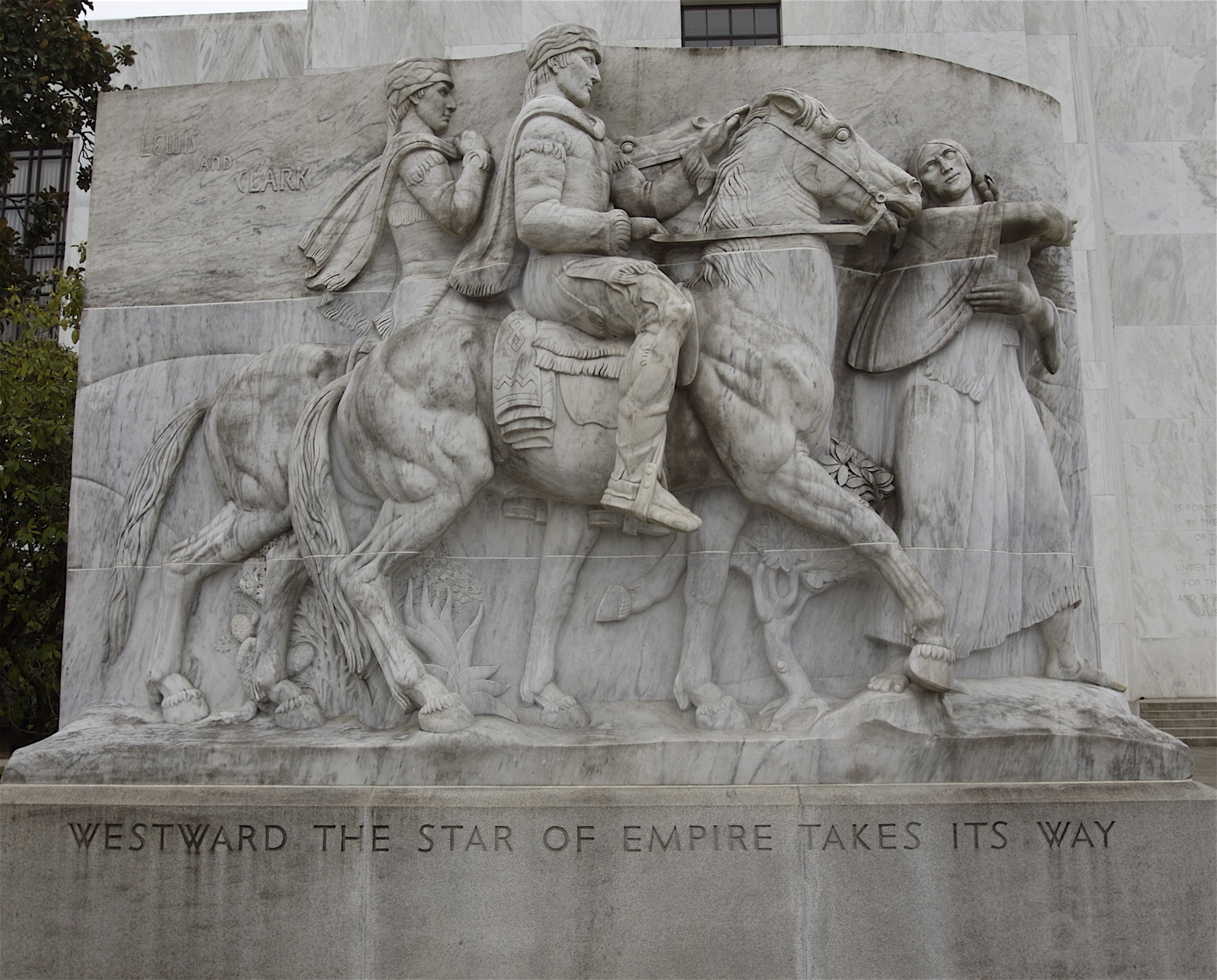
Lewis & Clark

=== Pennsylvania ===
- Gettysburg
  - Discovering the Enemy, 9th New York Cavalry Monument, by Caspar Buberl, 1888.
  - 17th Pennsylvania Cavalry Monument, by Smith Granite Company, 1889.
  - 8th Pennsylvania Cavalry Monument, by J.M. Gessler, ca. 1890.
  - Major-General Meade, by Henry Kirke Bush-Brown, Cemetery Ridge, 1896.
  - General Winfield Scott Hancock, by Frank Edwin Ellwell, Cemetery Hill, 1896.
  - Major-General Slocum, by Edward Clark Potter, Steven's Knoll, Gettysburg Battlefield 1898.
  - General John F. Reynolds, by Henry Kirke Bush-Brown, Gettysburg Battlefield, 1898–99.
  - General John Sedgwick, by Henry Kirke Bush-Brown, Gettysburg Battlefield, 1910–13.
  - Major-General Robert E. Lee atop Virginia State Monument, by Frederick William Sievers, 1917.
  - General Oliver O. Howard, by Robert Aitken, Gettysburg Battlefield, 1932.
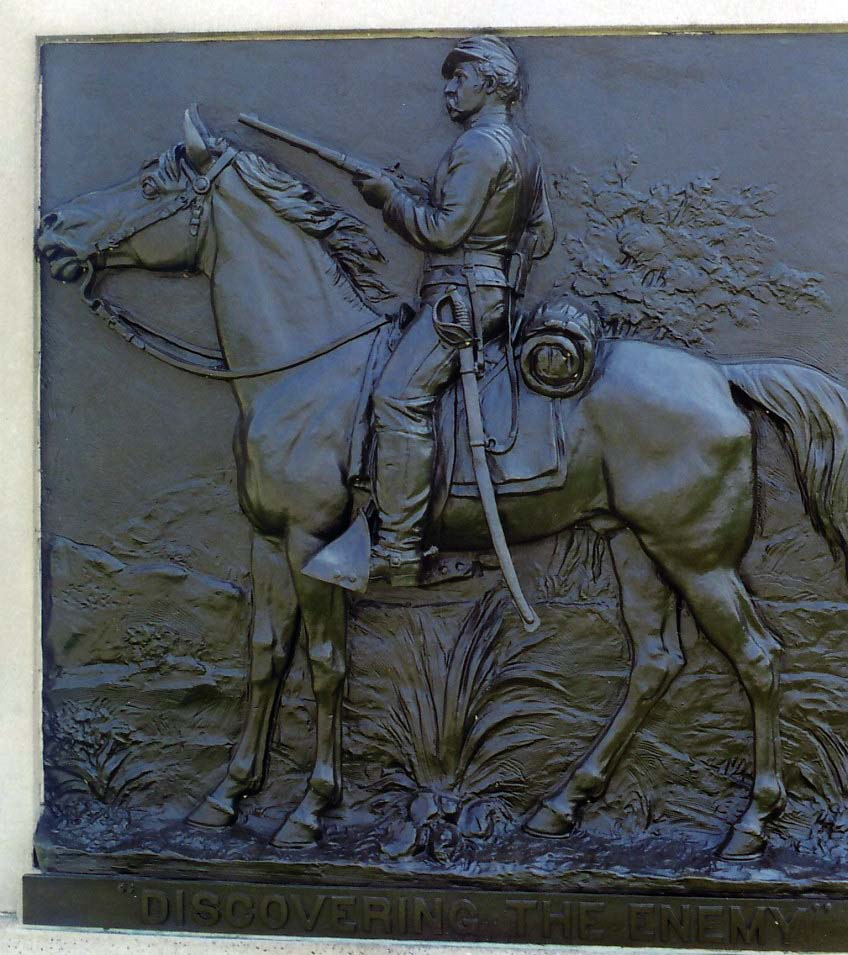
9th NY Cavalry Monument

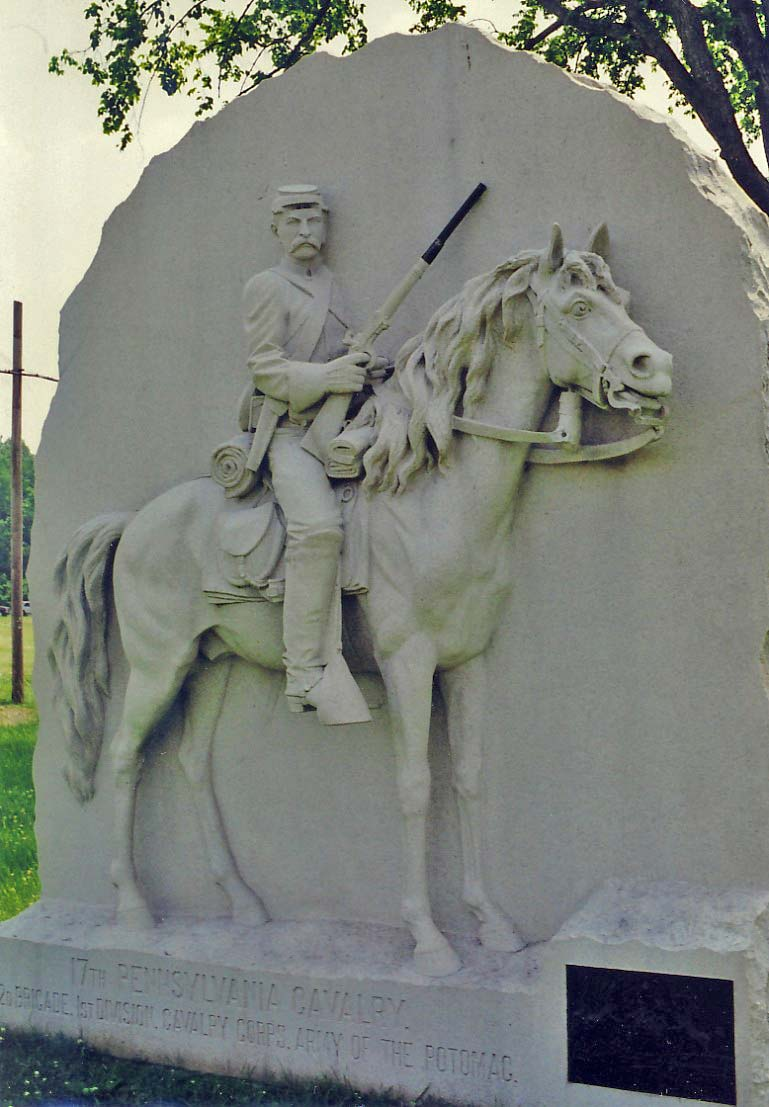
17th PA Cavalry Monument

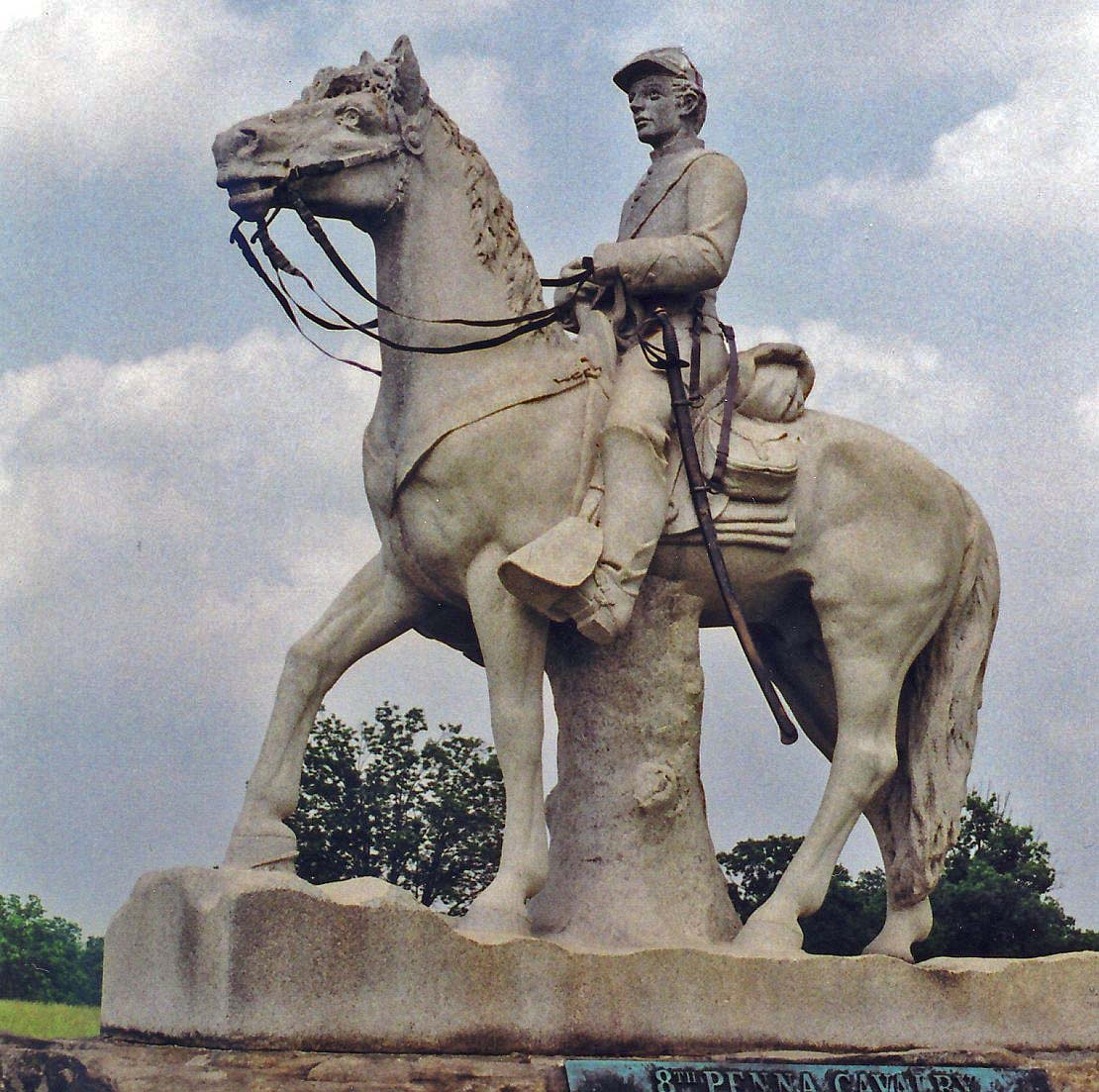
8th PA Cavalry Monument

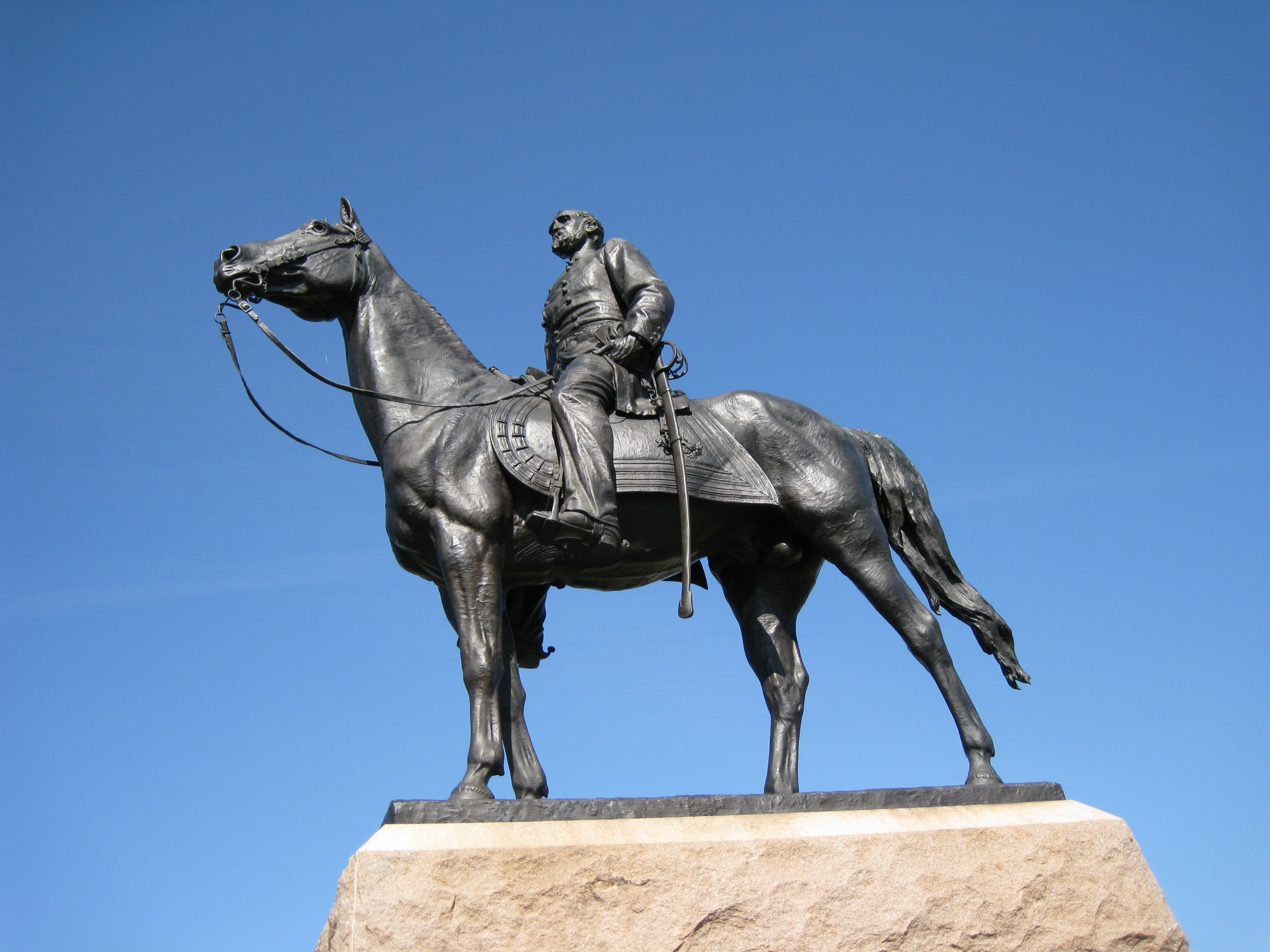
Meade

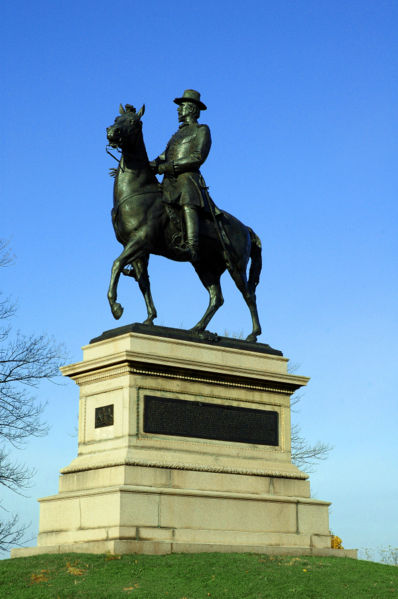
Hancock

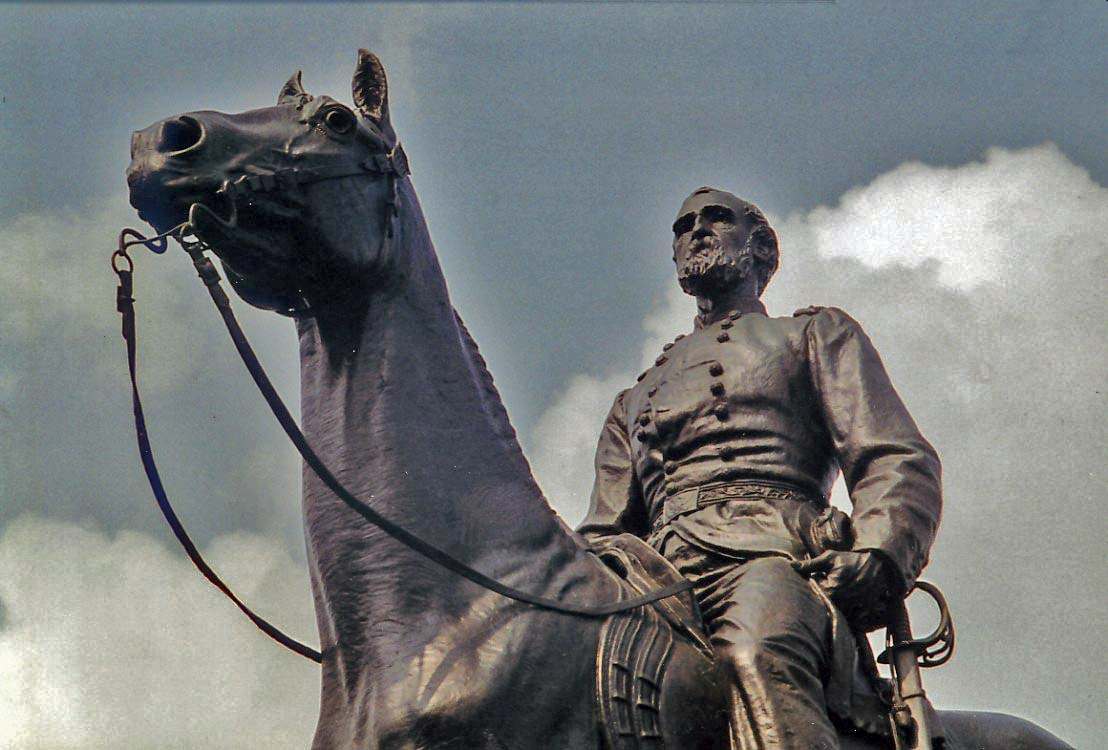
Slocum

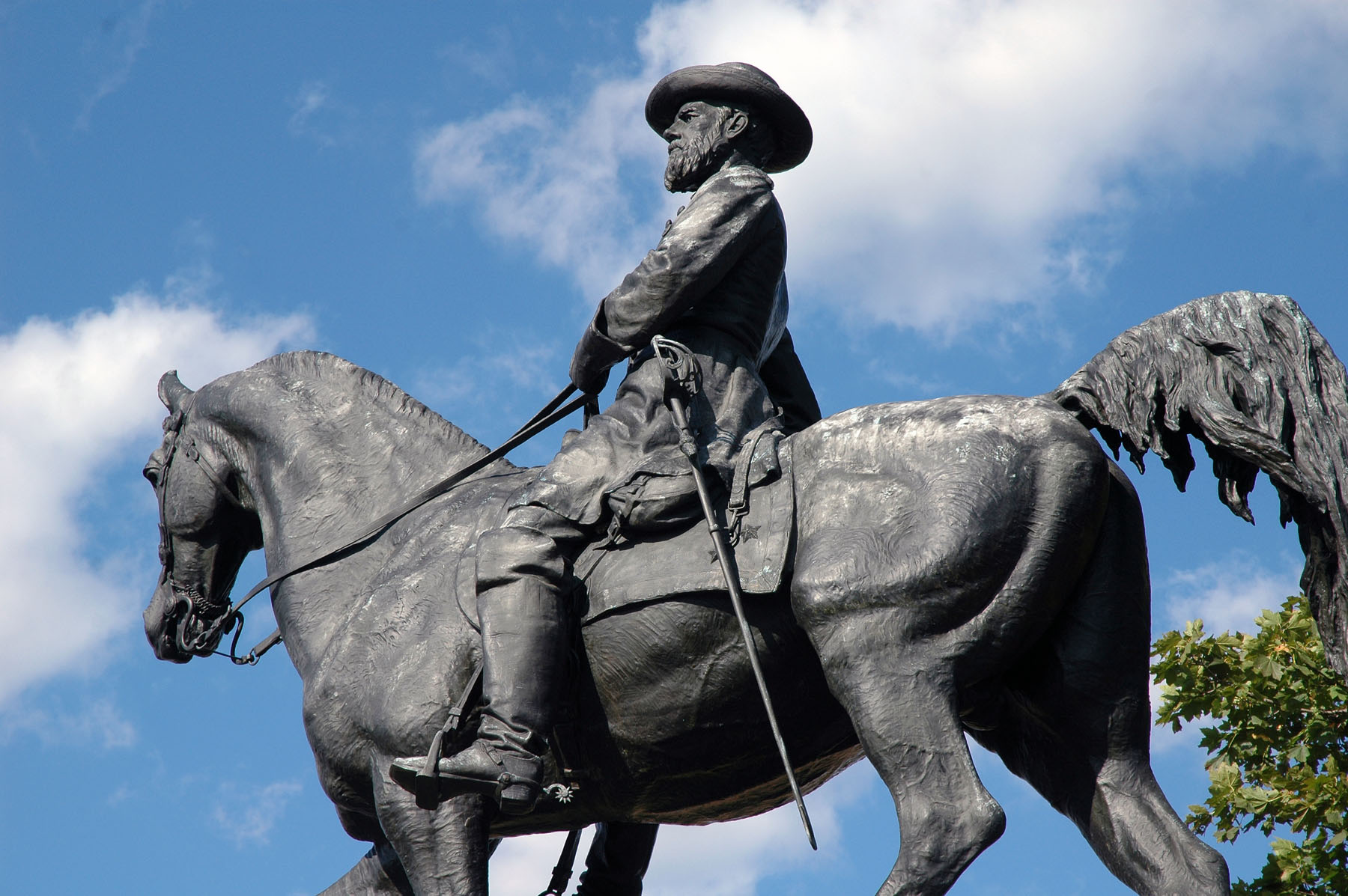
Reynolds

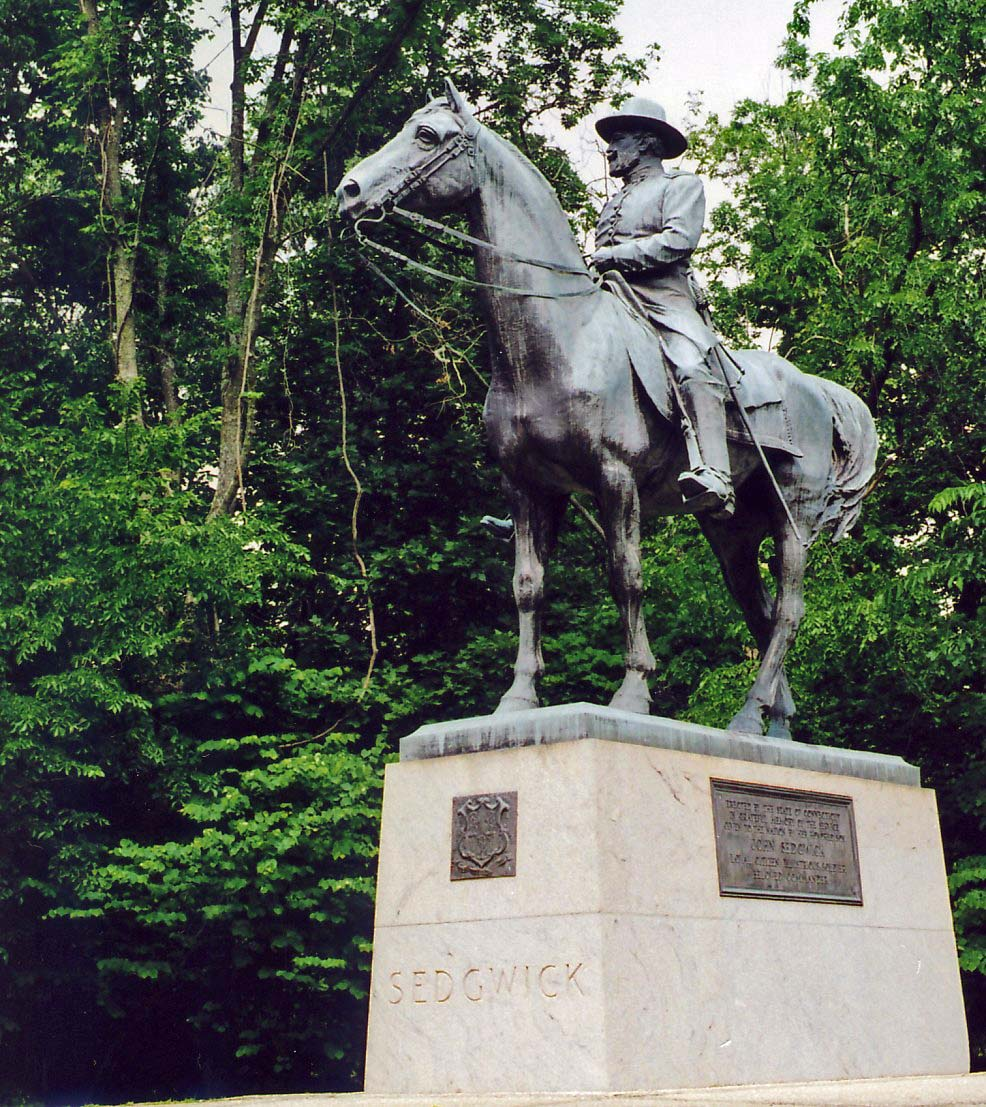
Sedgwick

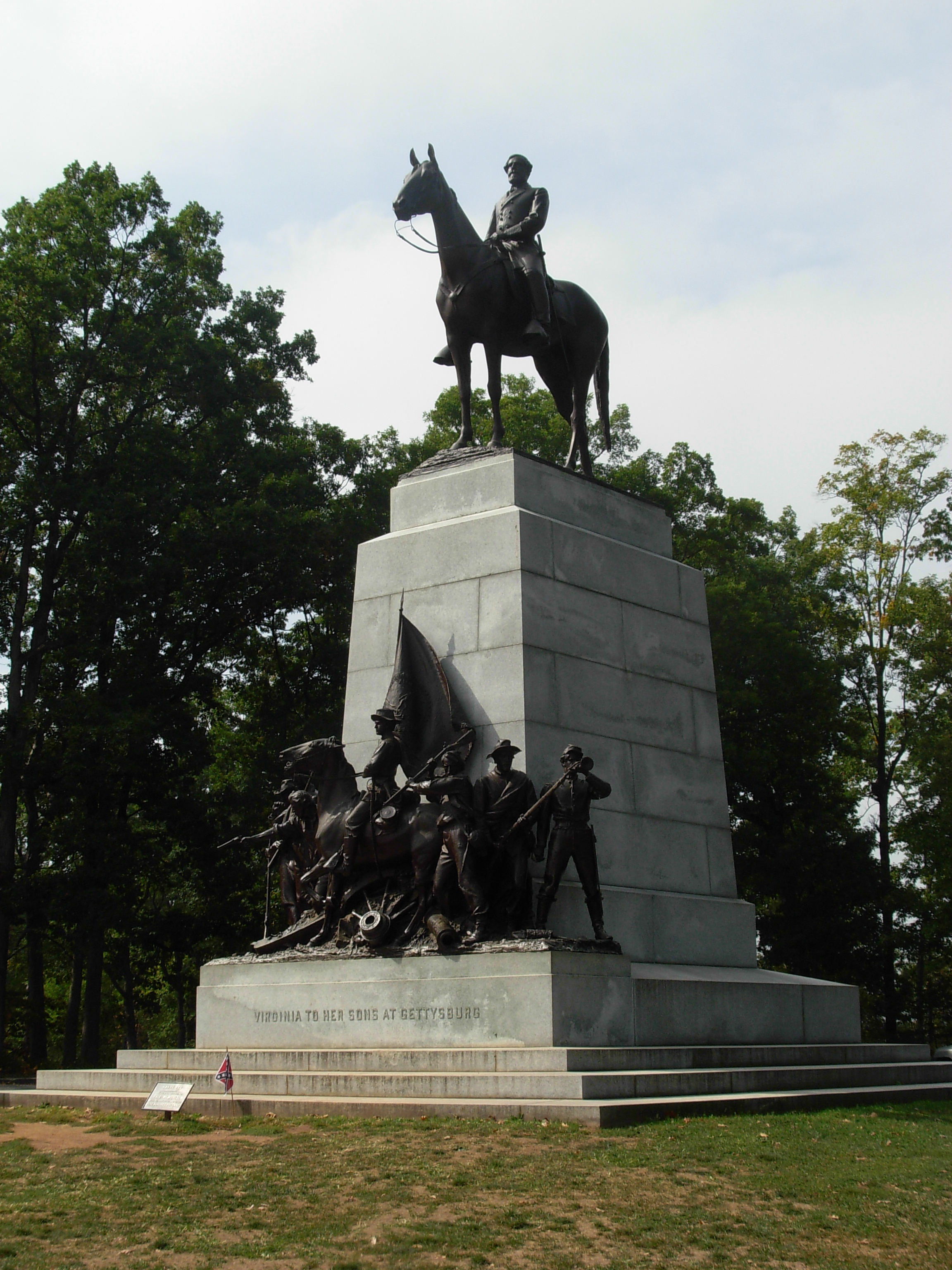
Virginia State Monument

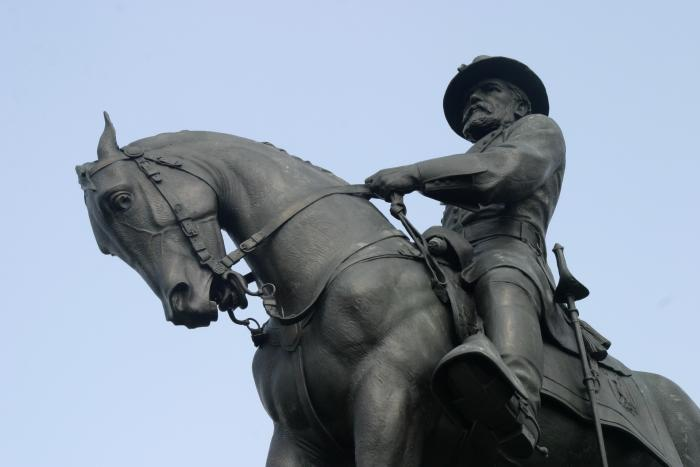
Howard
- Hanover
  - The Sentry (also called The Pickett or The Cavalryman), by Cyrus Edwin Dallin, Center Square, 1904.
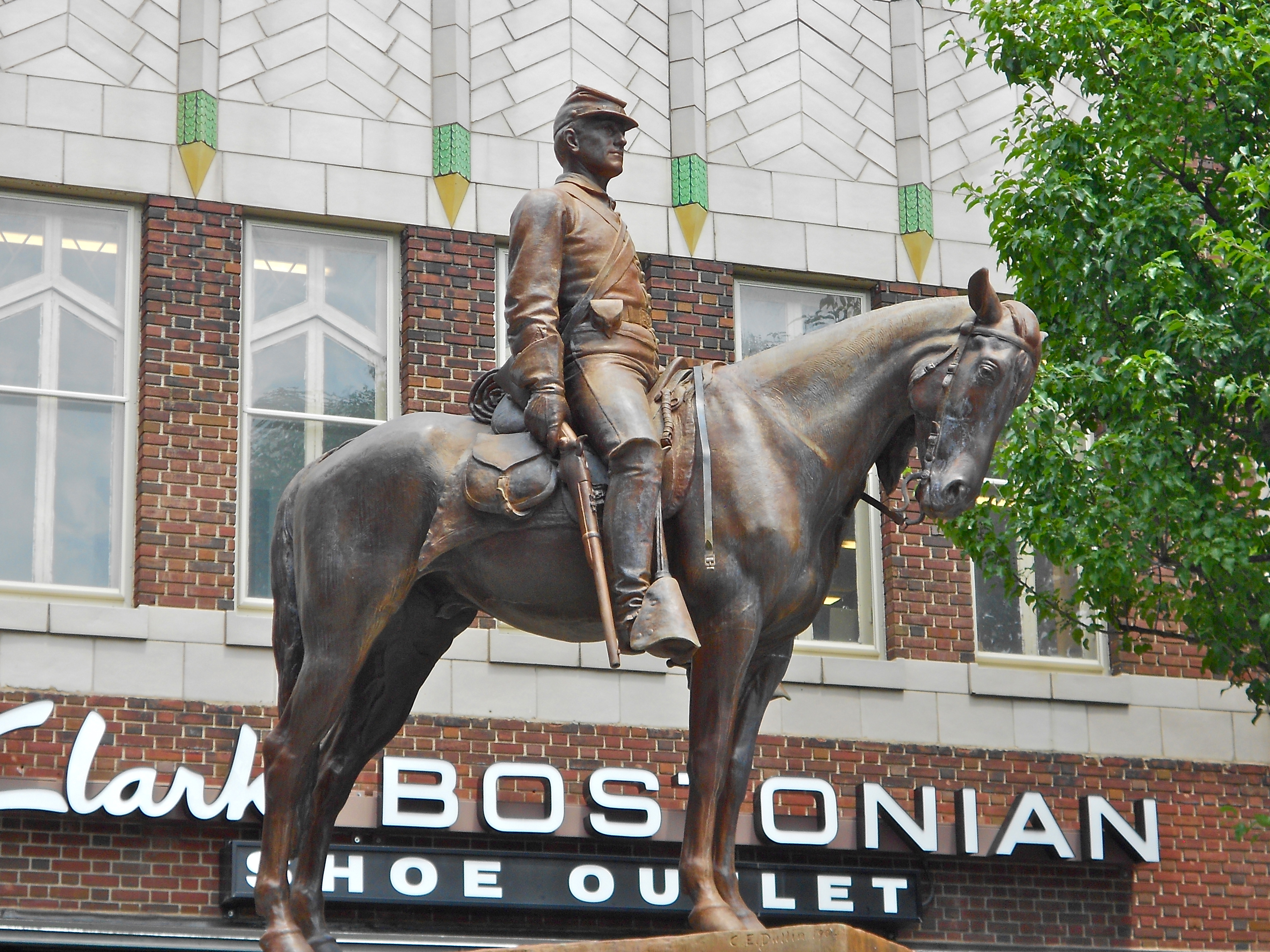
The Sentry
- Harrisburg
  - General John Fredderic Hartranft, by Frederick W. Ruckstull, Pennsylvania State Capitol, 1897–99.
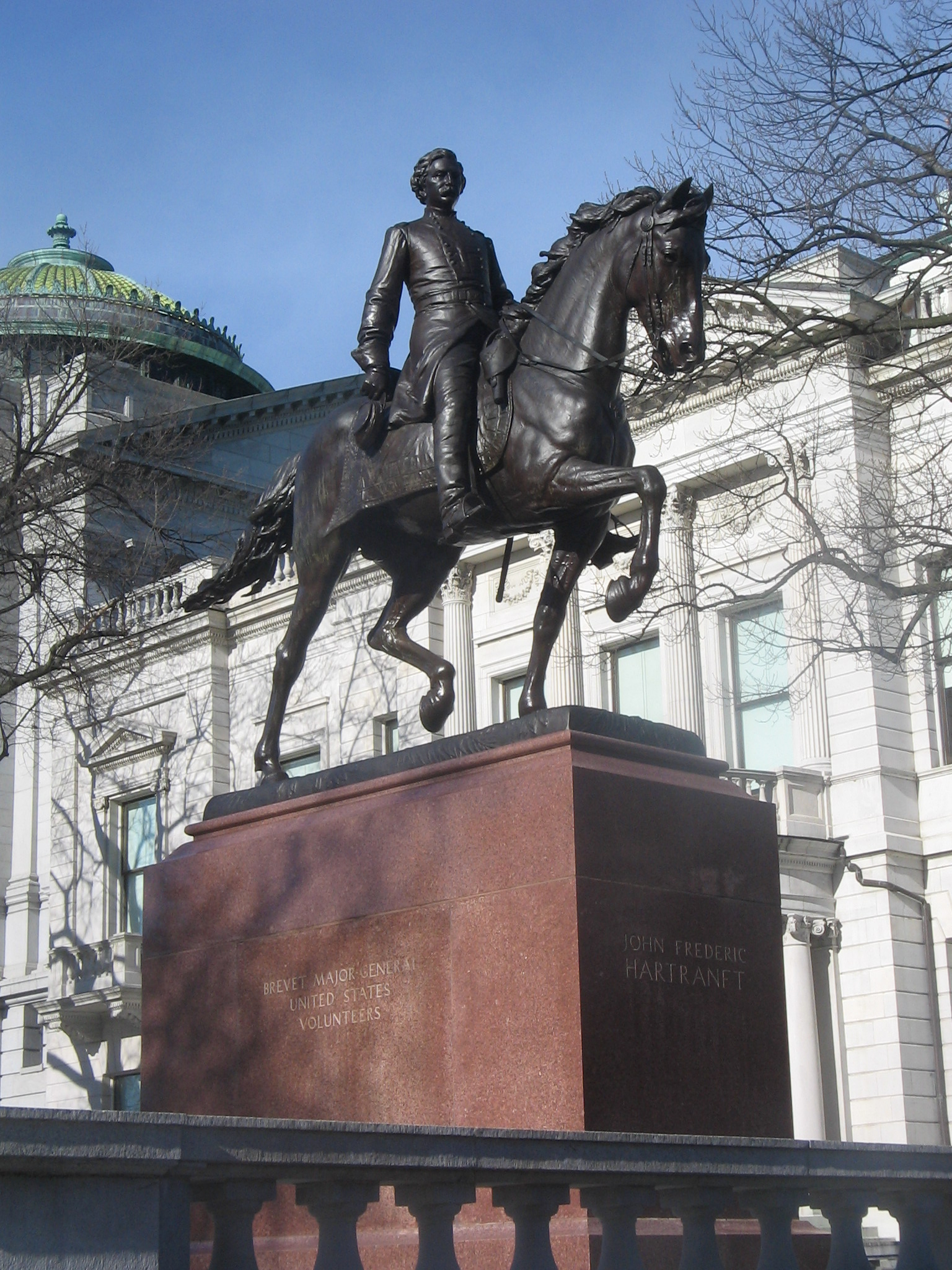
Hartranft
- Philadelphia
  - The Amazon, by August Kiss, Philadelphia Museum of Art, 1837, this cast 1929.
  - The Lion Fighter, by Albert Wolff, Philadelphia Museum of Art, 1858.
  - Pegasus (pair of statues), by Vincent Pilz, Memorial Hall, ca. 1863. Rejected for the Vienna State Operahouse, they were installed in Philadelphia in 1876.
  - General John Fulton Reynolds, by John Rogers, Philadelphia City Hall, 1884.
  - General George Gordon Meade, by Alexander Milne Calder, Philadelphia City Hall, 1887.
  - Joan of Arc, by Emmanuel Frémiet, Fairmount Park, 1890.
  - General George B. McClellan, by Henry Jackson Ellicott, Philadelphia City Hall, 1894.
  - General George Washington, by Rudolf Siemering, Washington Monument, Eakins Oval, 1897.
  - General Ulysses S. Grant, by Daniel Chester French (Grant) and Edward Clark Potter (horse), Fairmount Park, 1897.
  - The Medicine Man, by Cyrus Dallin, Fairmount Park, 1899.
  - Cowboy, by Frederic Remington, Fairmount Park, 1908.
  - General Winfield Scott Hancock, by John Quincy Adams Ward, Smith Memorial Arch, 1910.
  - General George B. McClellan, by Edward Clark Potter, Smith Memorial Arch, 1912.
  - General Anthony Wayne, by John Gregory, Philadelphia Museum of Art, 1937.
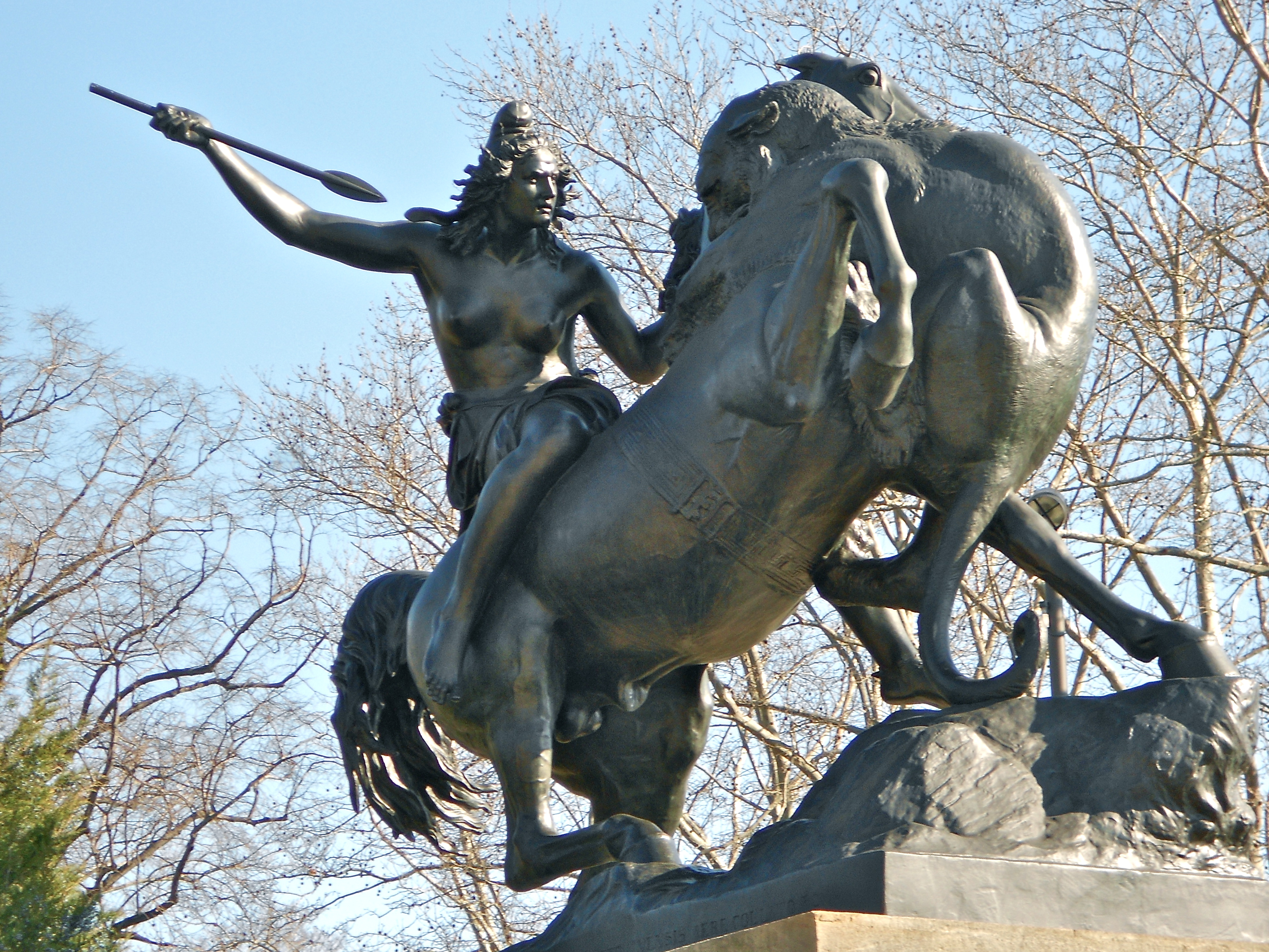
Amazon

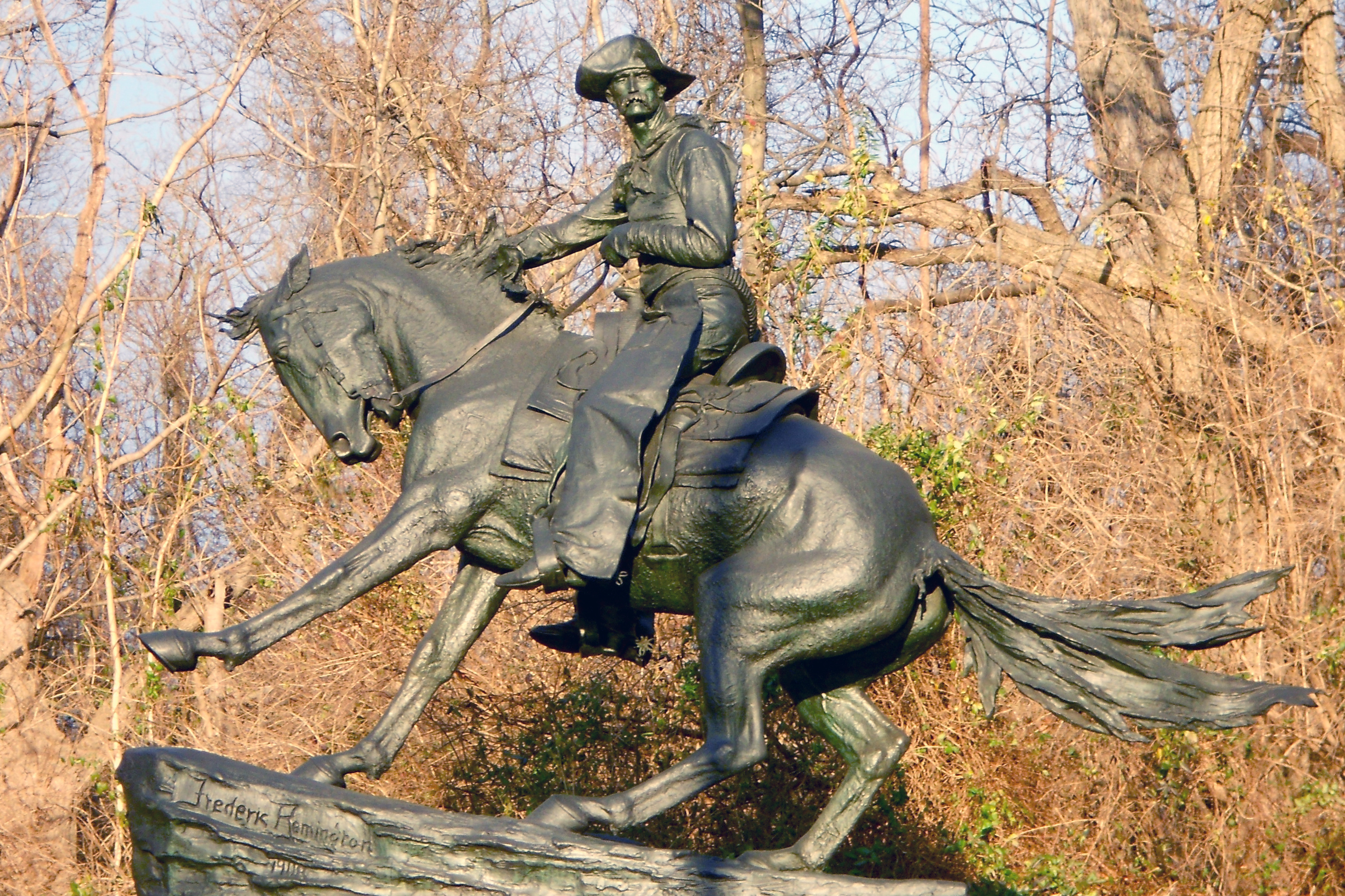
Cowboy

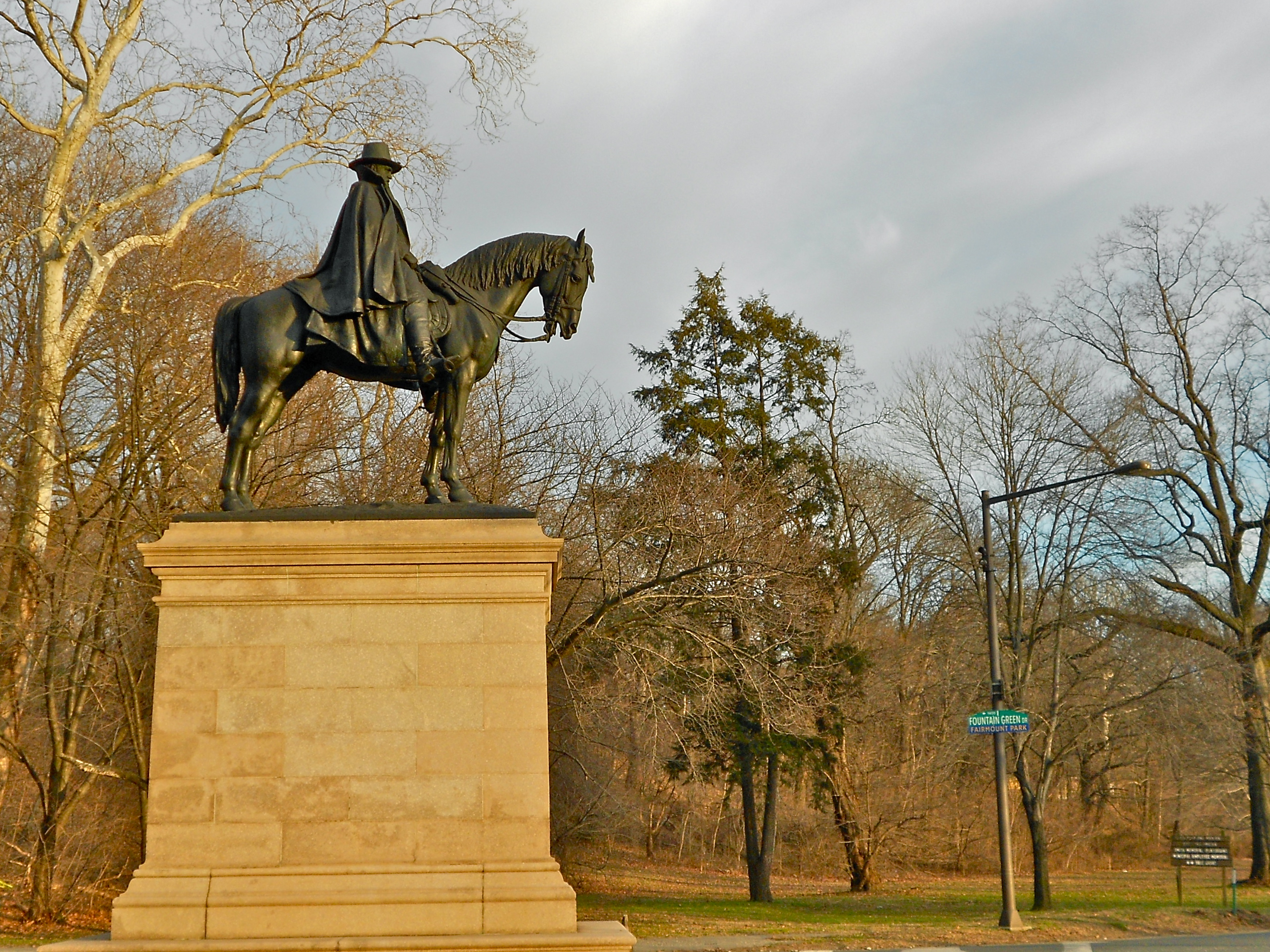
Grant

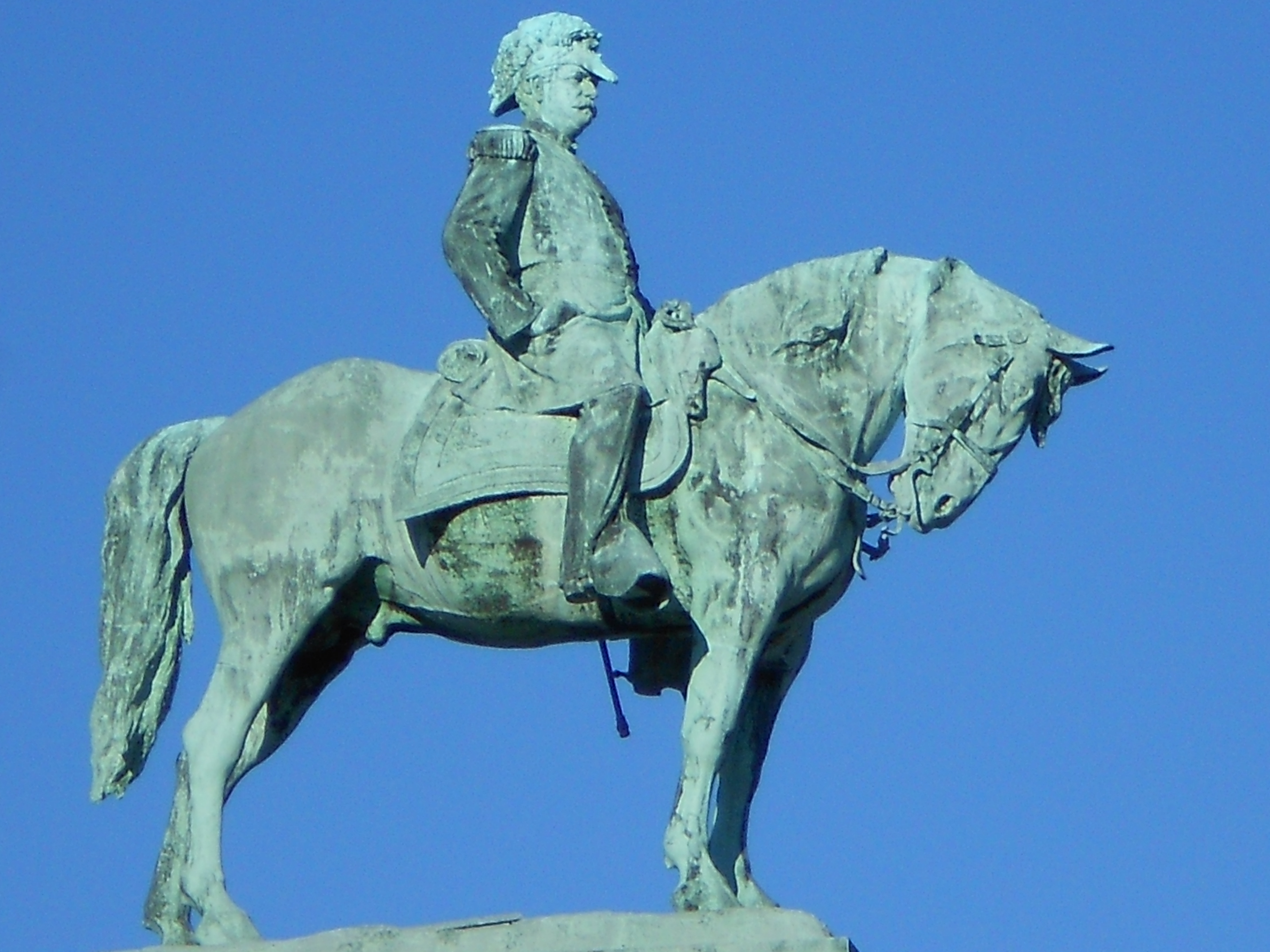
Hancock

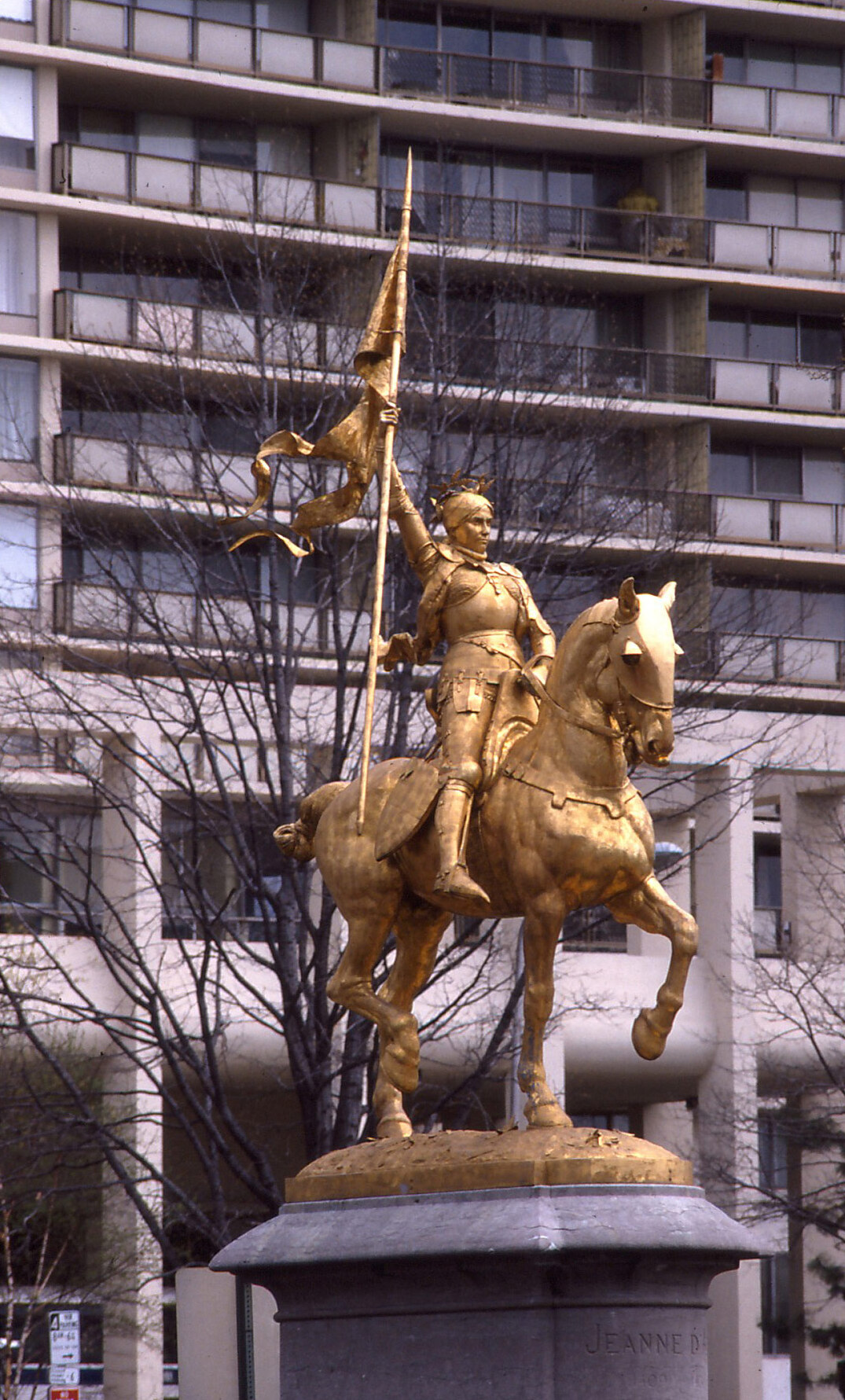
Joan of Arc

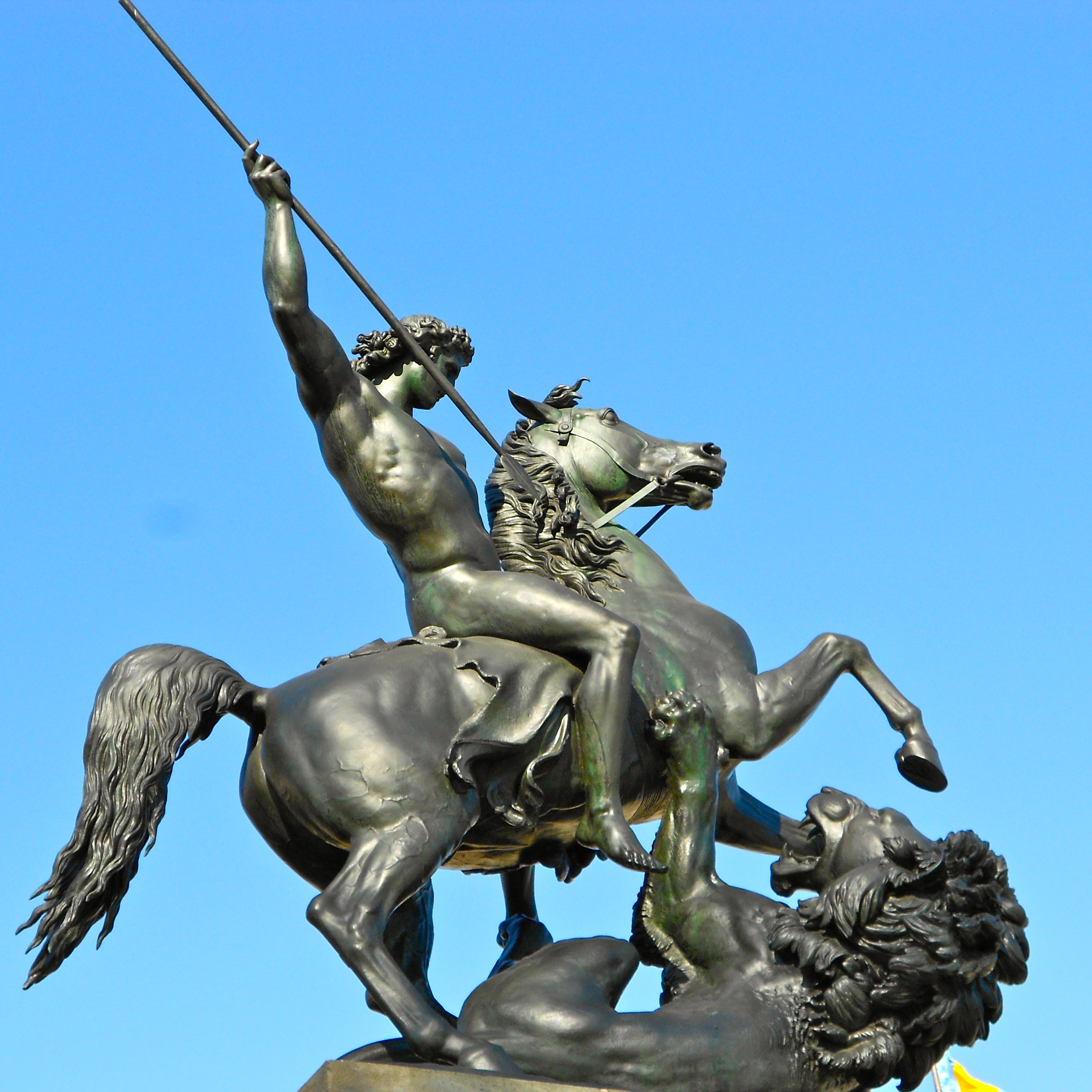
Lion Fighter

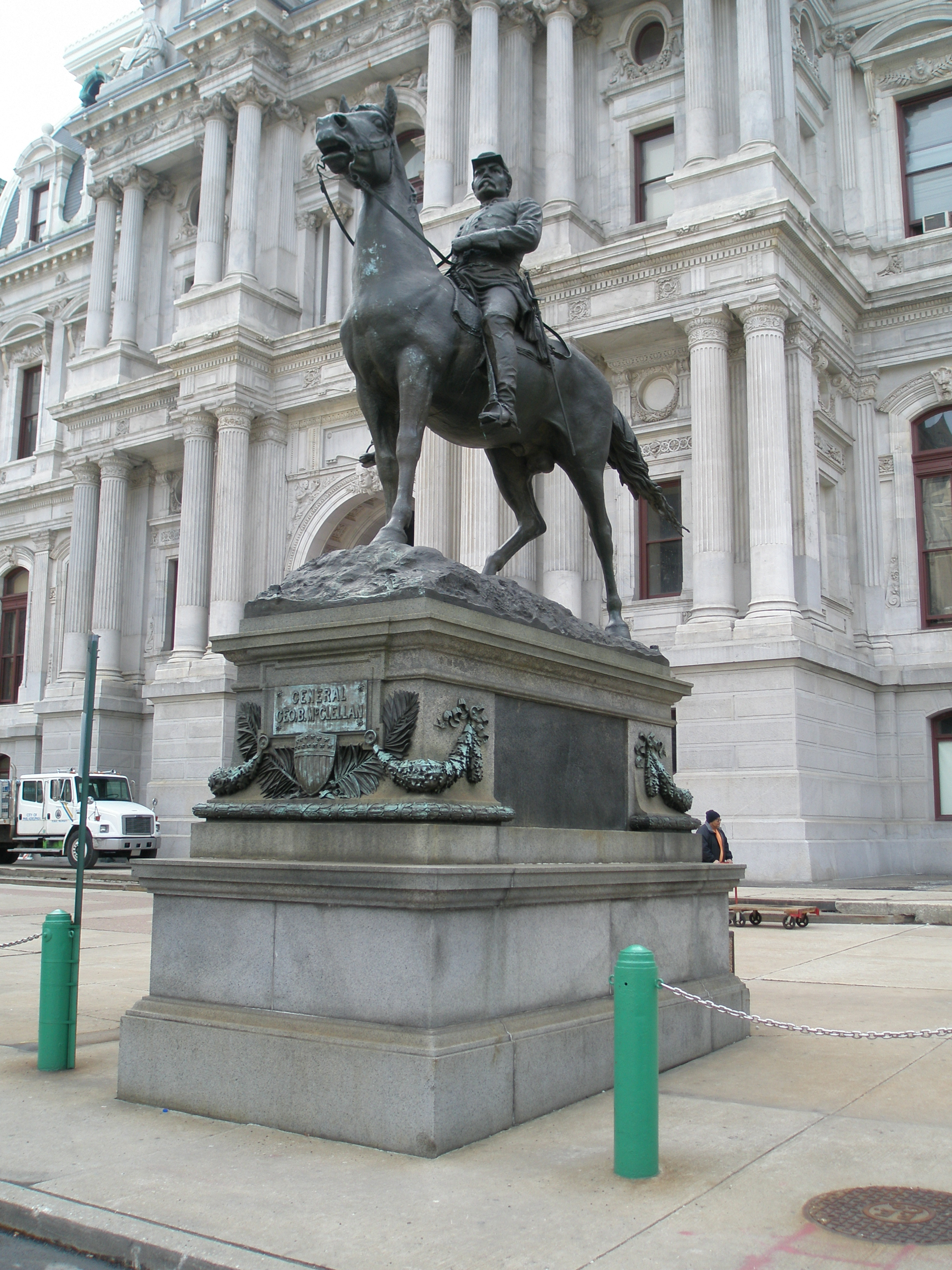
McClellan by Ellicott

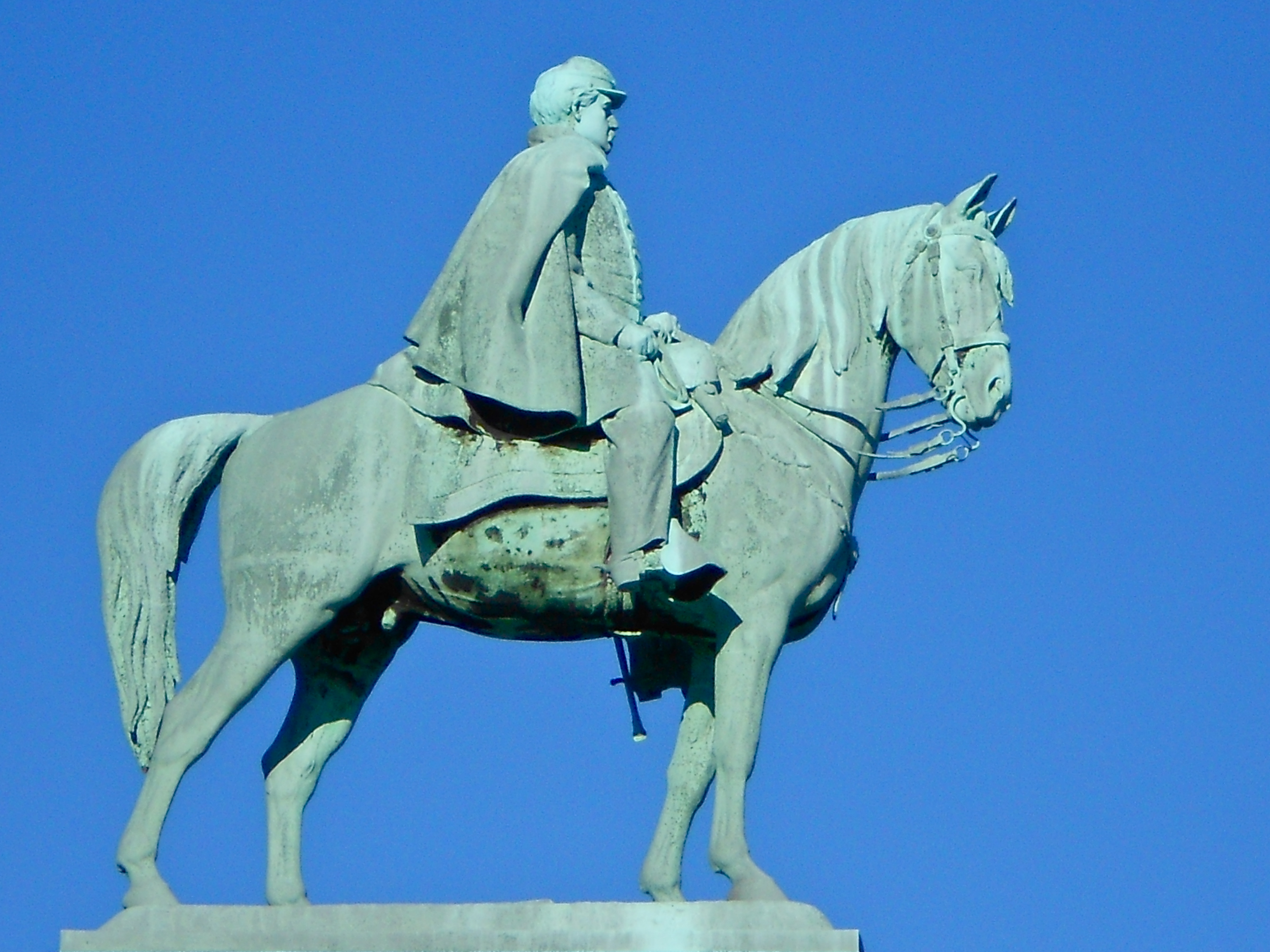
McClellan by Potter

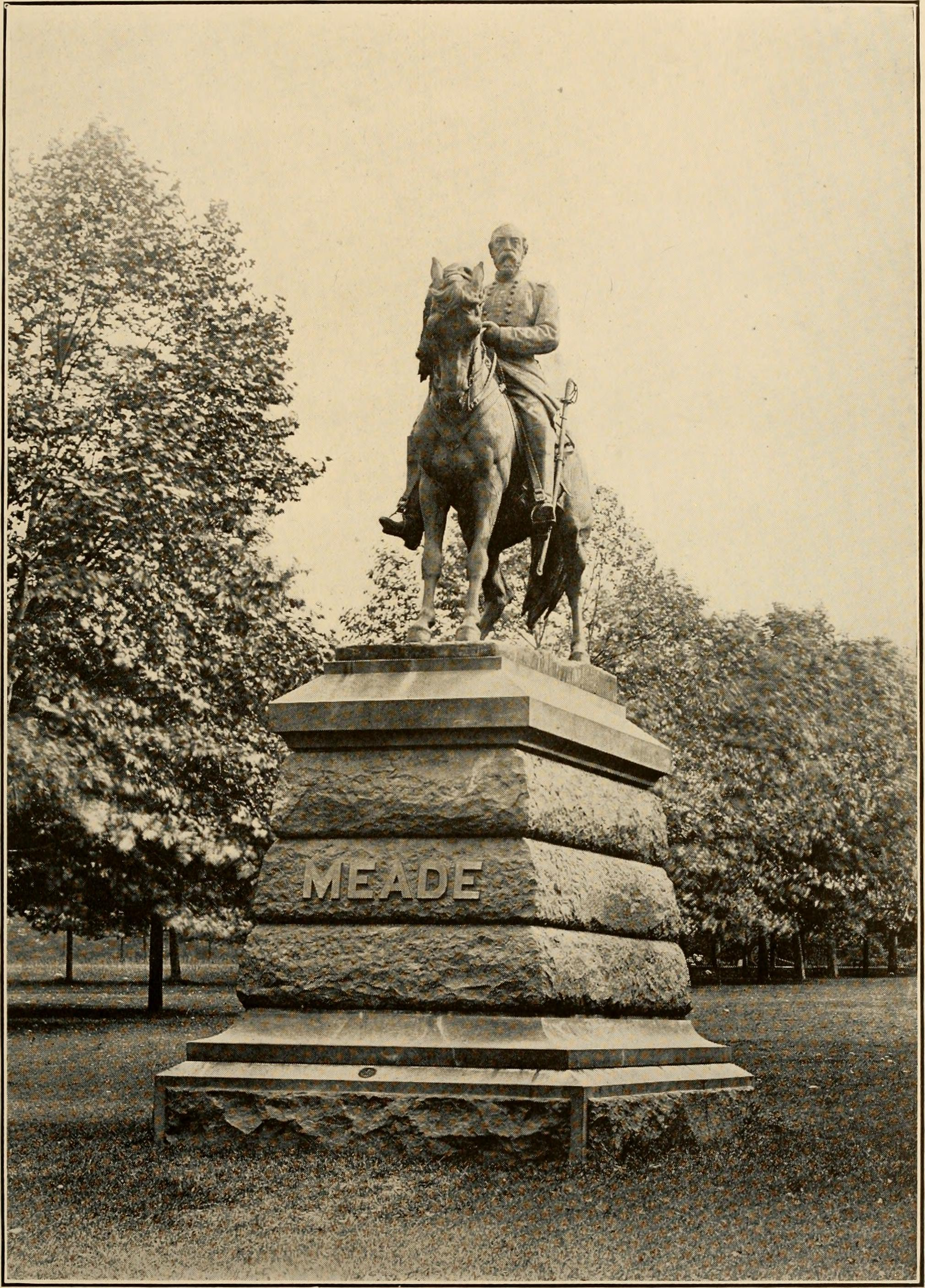
Meade

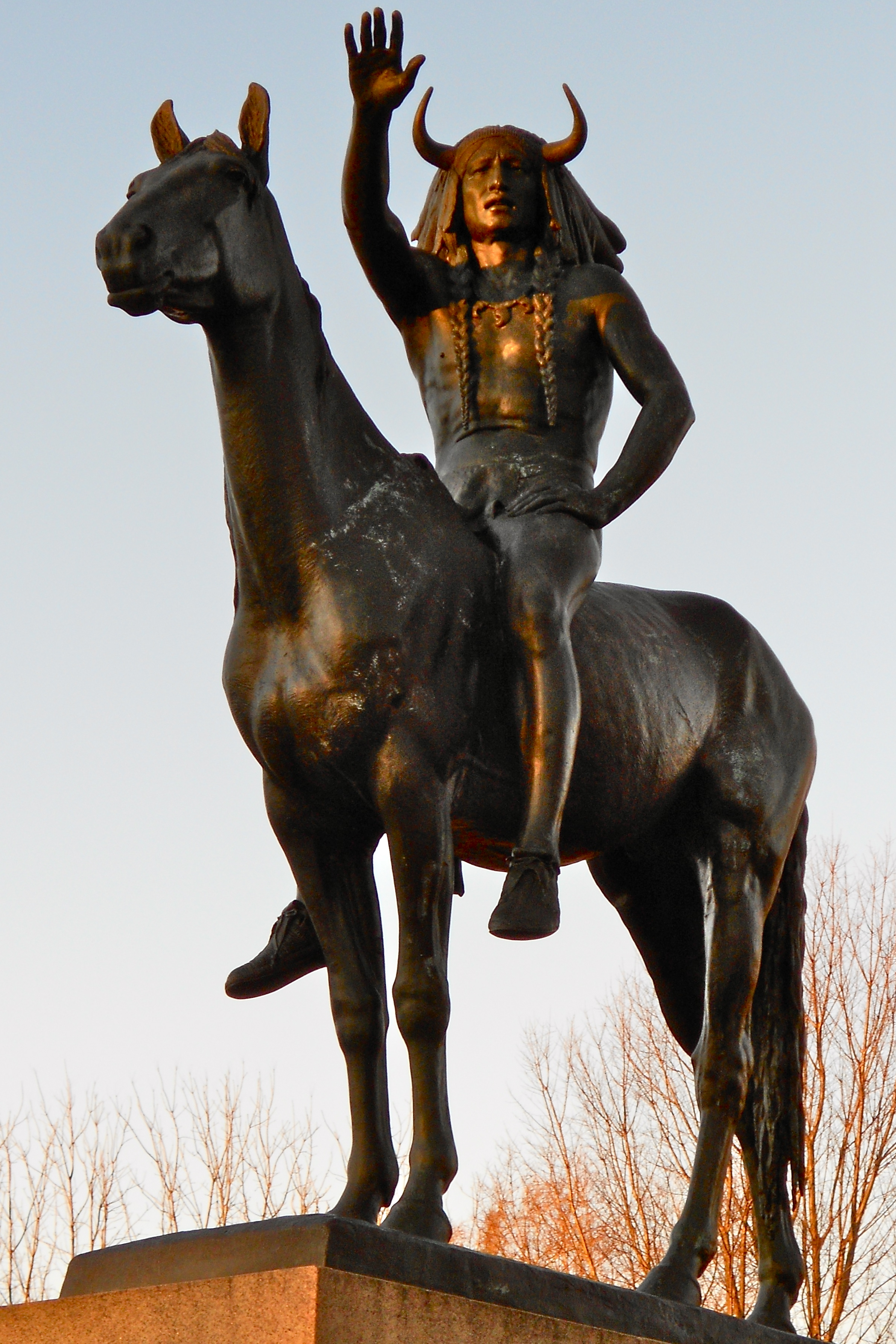
Medicine Man

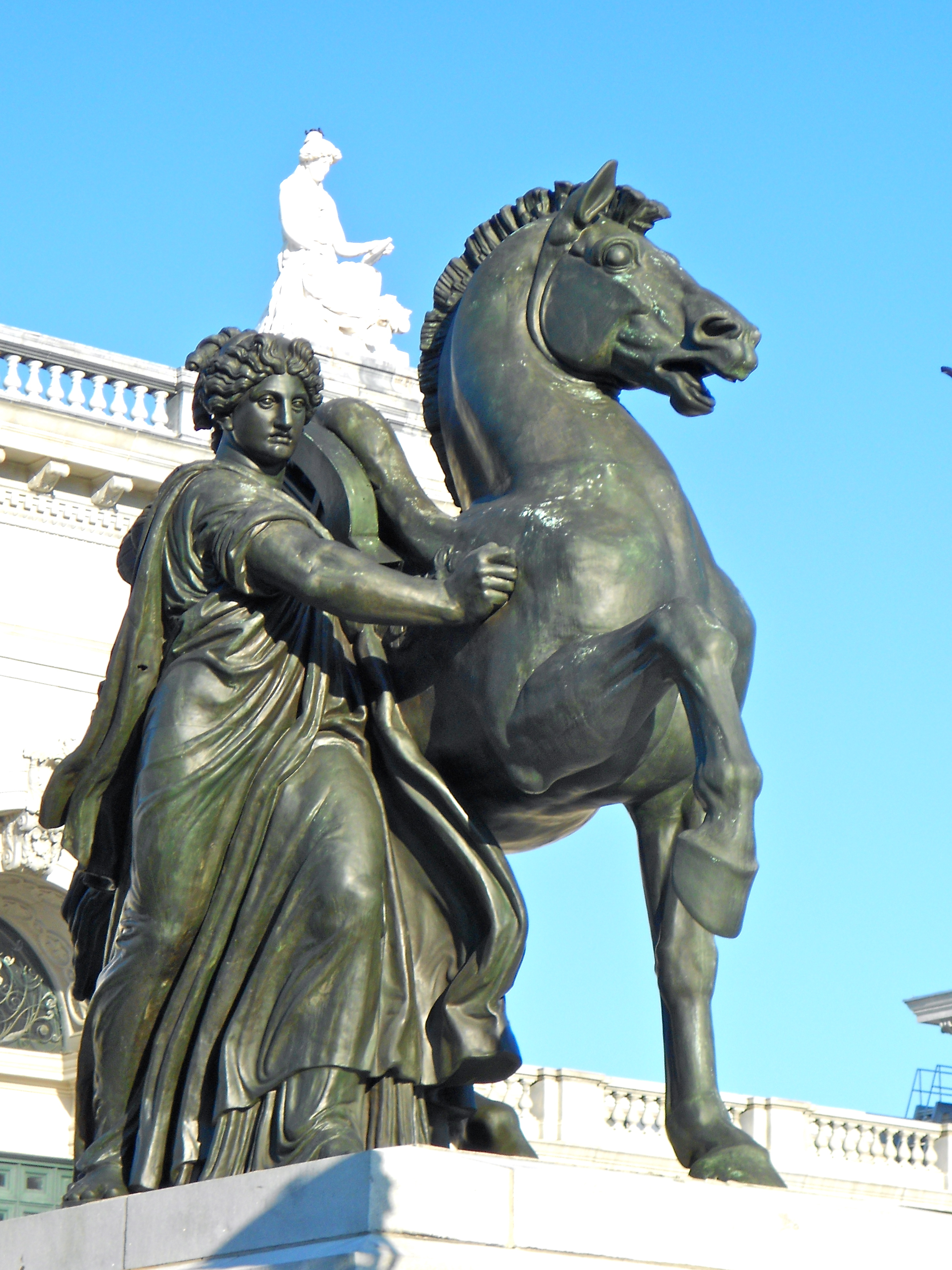
Pegasus

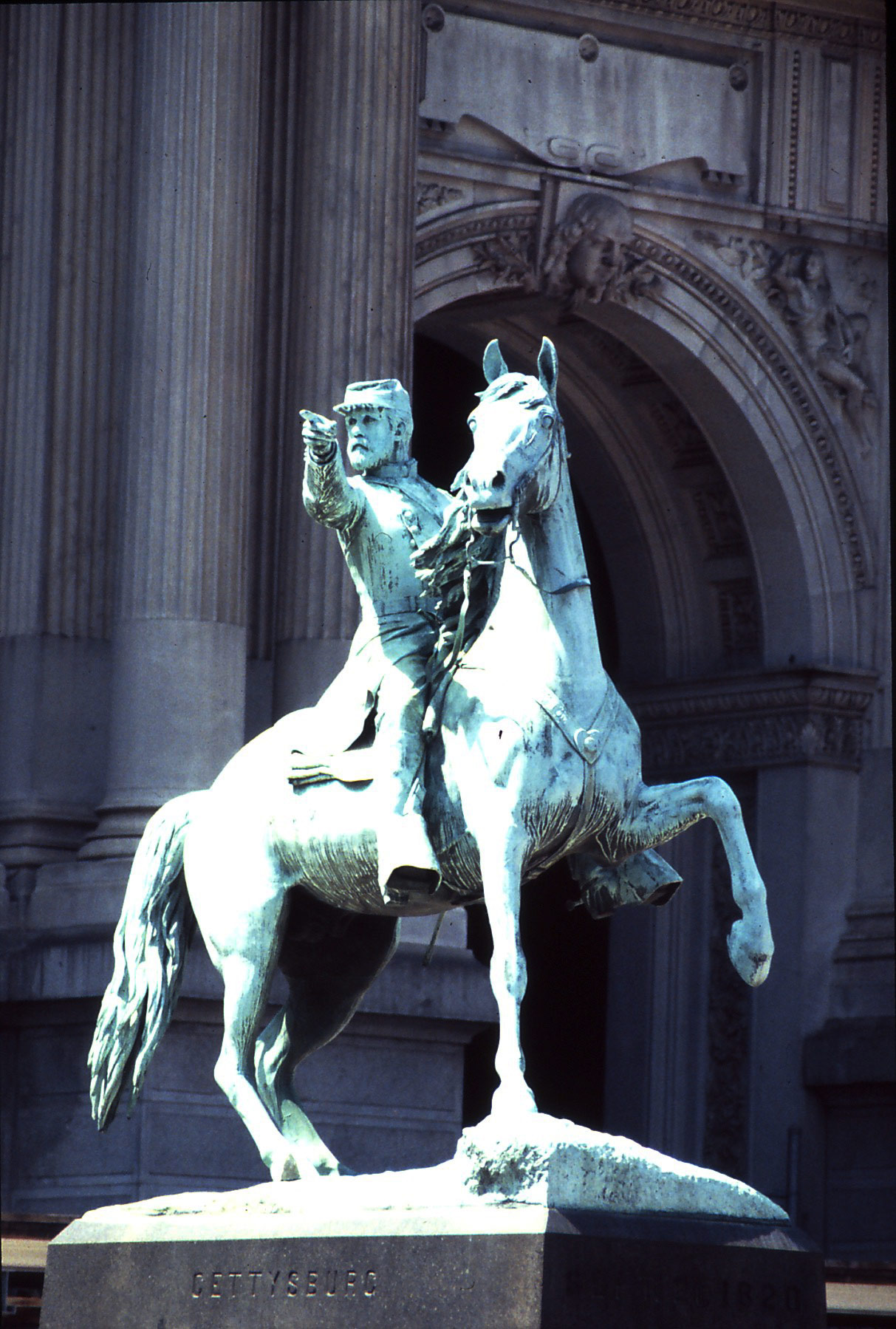
Reynolds

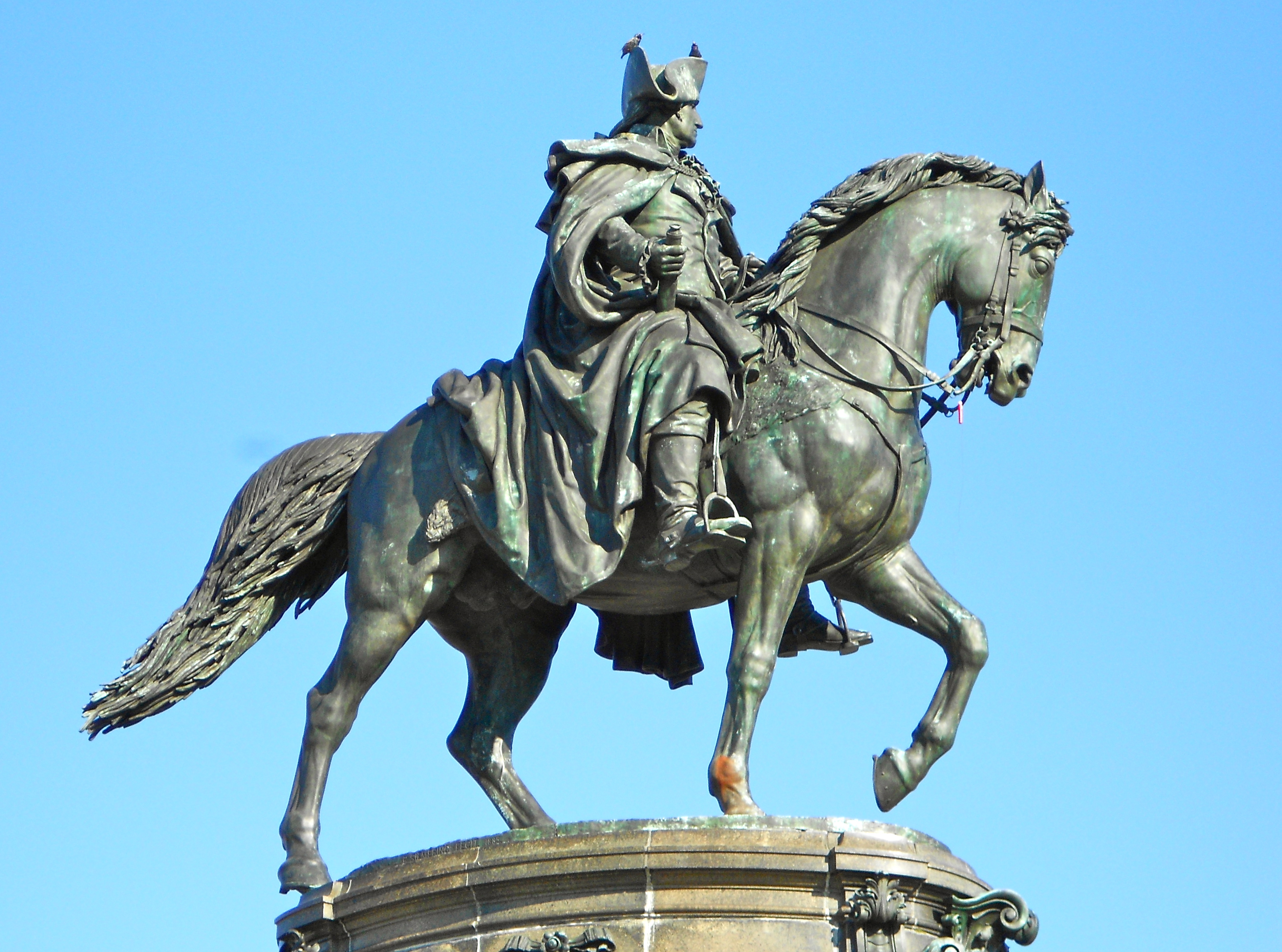
Washington

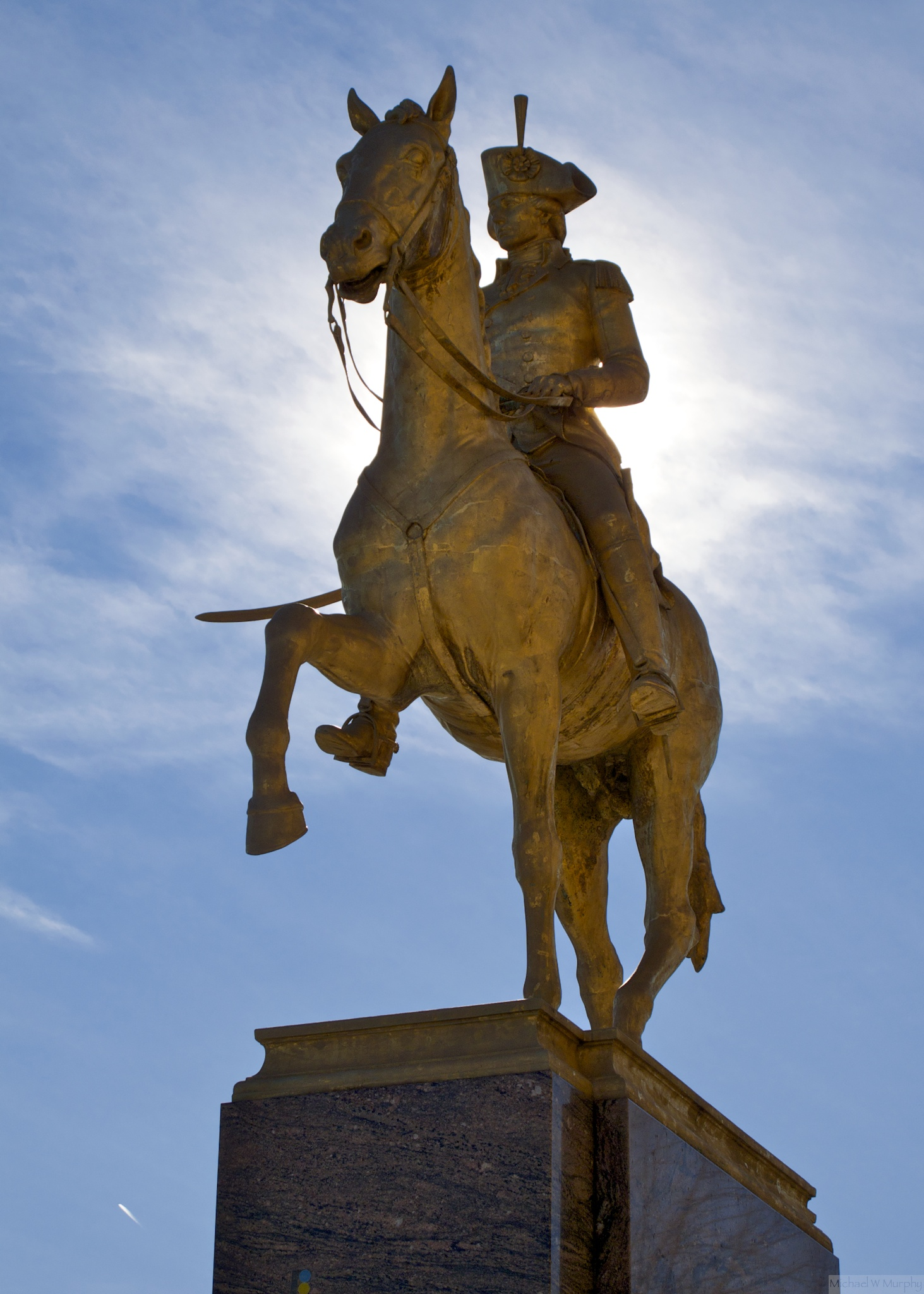
Wayne
- Pittsburgh
  - George Washington Memorial, by Edward Ludwig Albert Pausch, Allegheny Commons Park, 1891.
  - Sir Samelot, Tustin and Seneca Streets. Dedicated October, 2011.
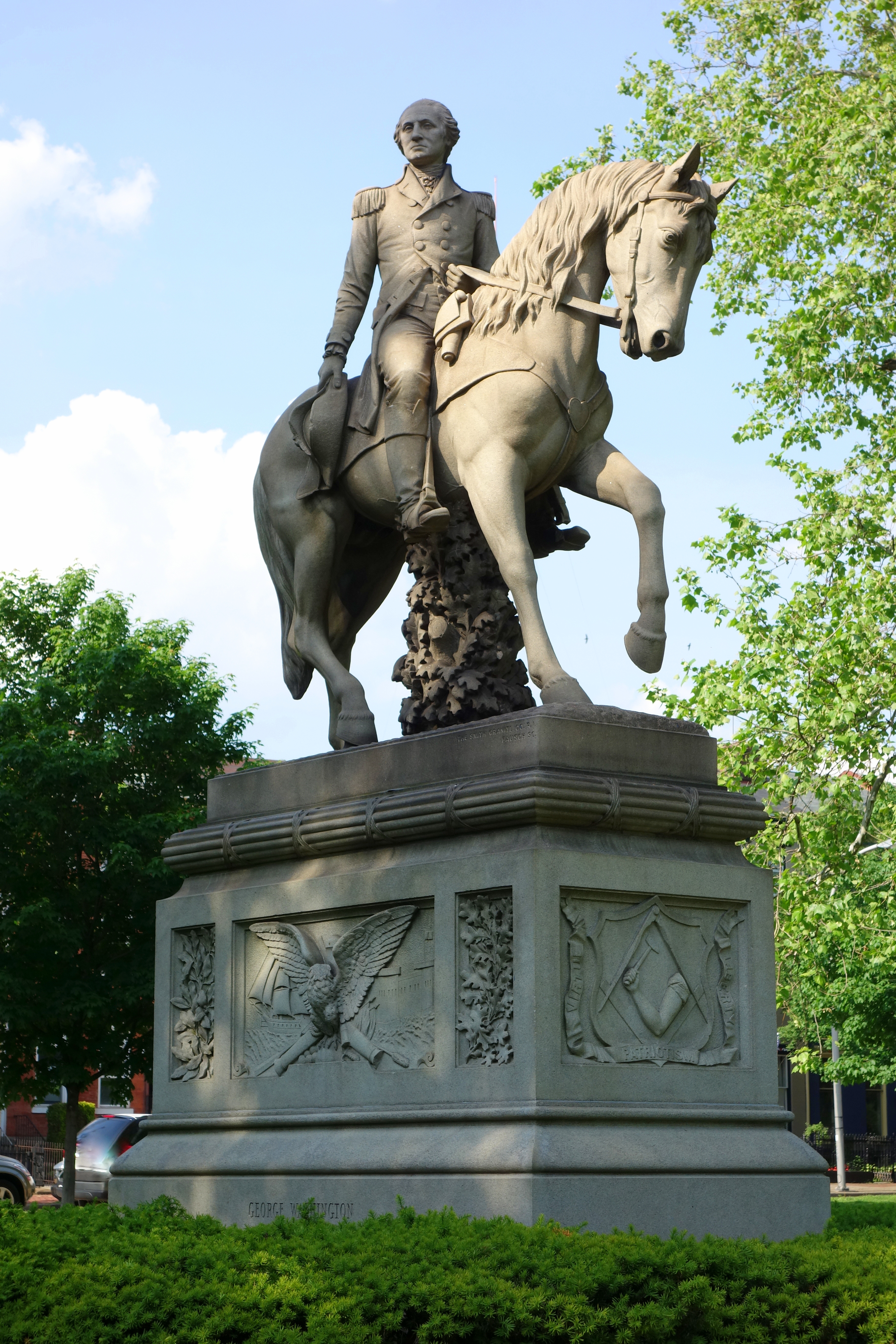
George Washington Memorial
- Reading
  - Major General David McMurtrie Gregg, by Augustus Lukeman, 4th Street & Centre Avenue, 1922.
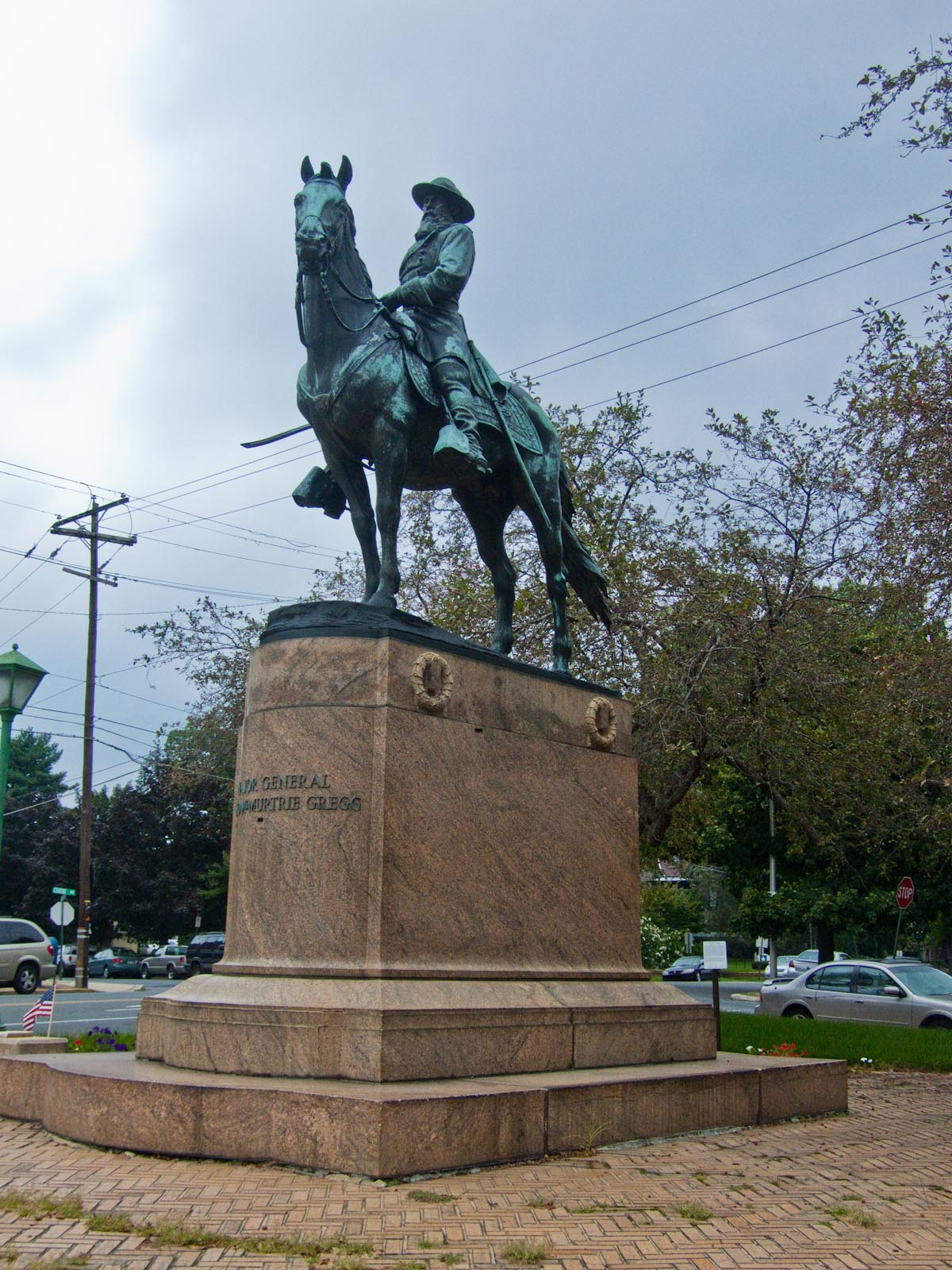
General Gregg

=== Rhode Island ===
- Providence
  - Major General Ambrose E. Burnside, by Launt Thompson, Burnside Park, 1887.
  - Marcus Aurelius, replica of the Roman Equestrian Statue of Marcus Aurelius, Brown University, 1908.
  - General Pulaski, by Guido Nincheri, Roger Williams Park, 1953.
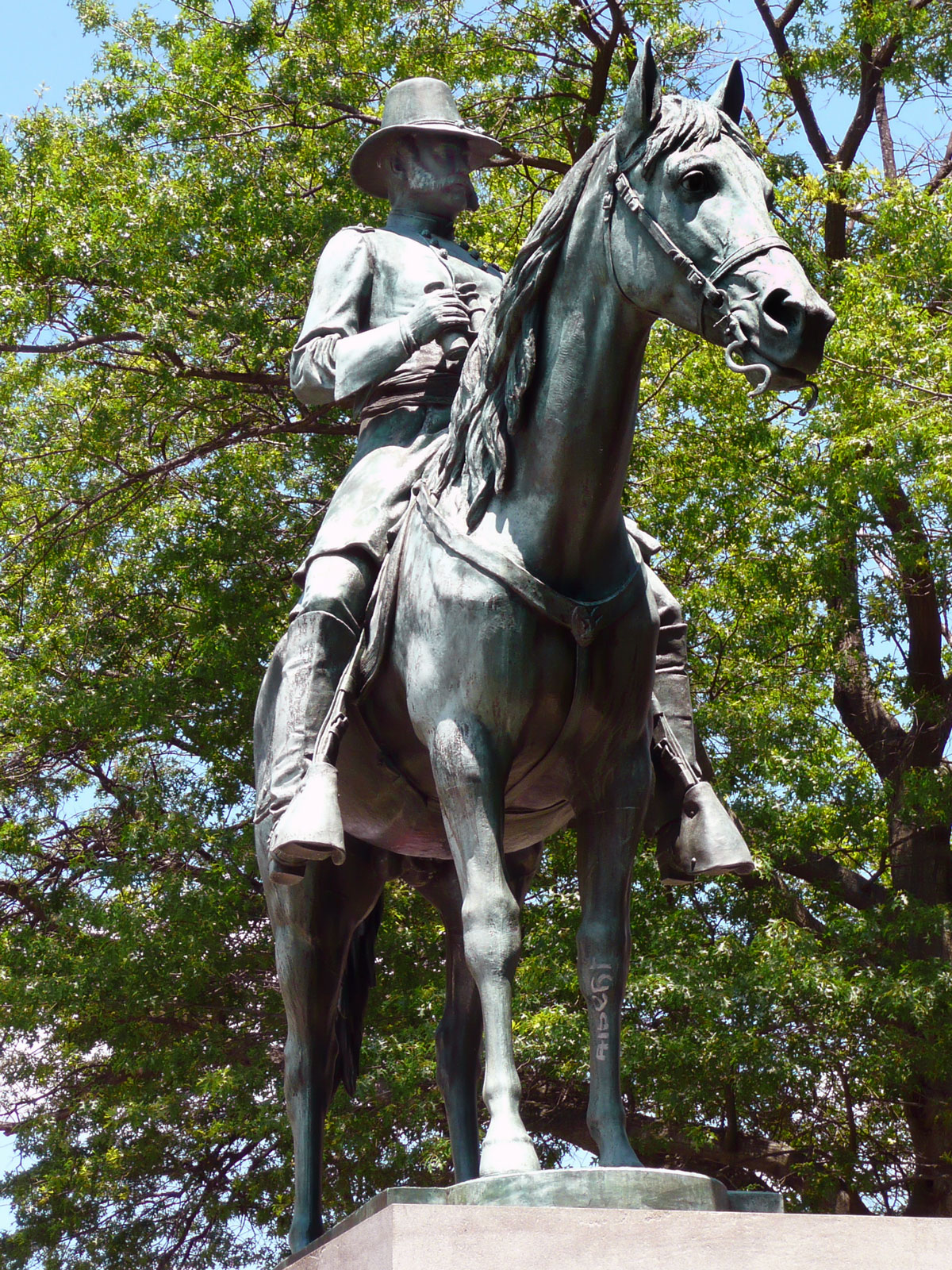
Burnside

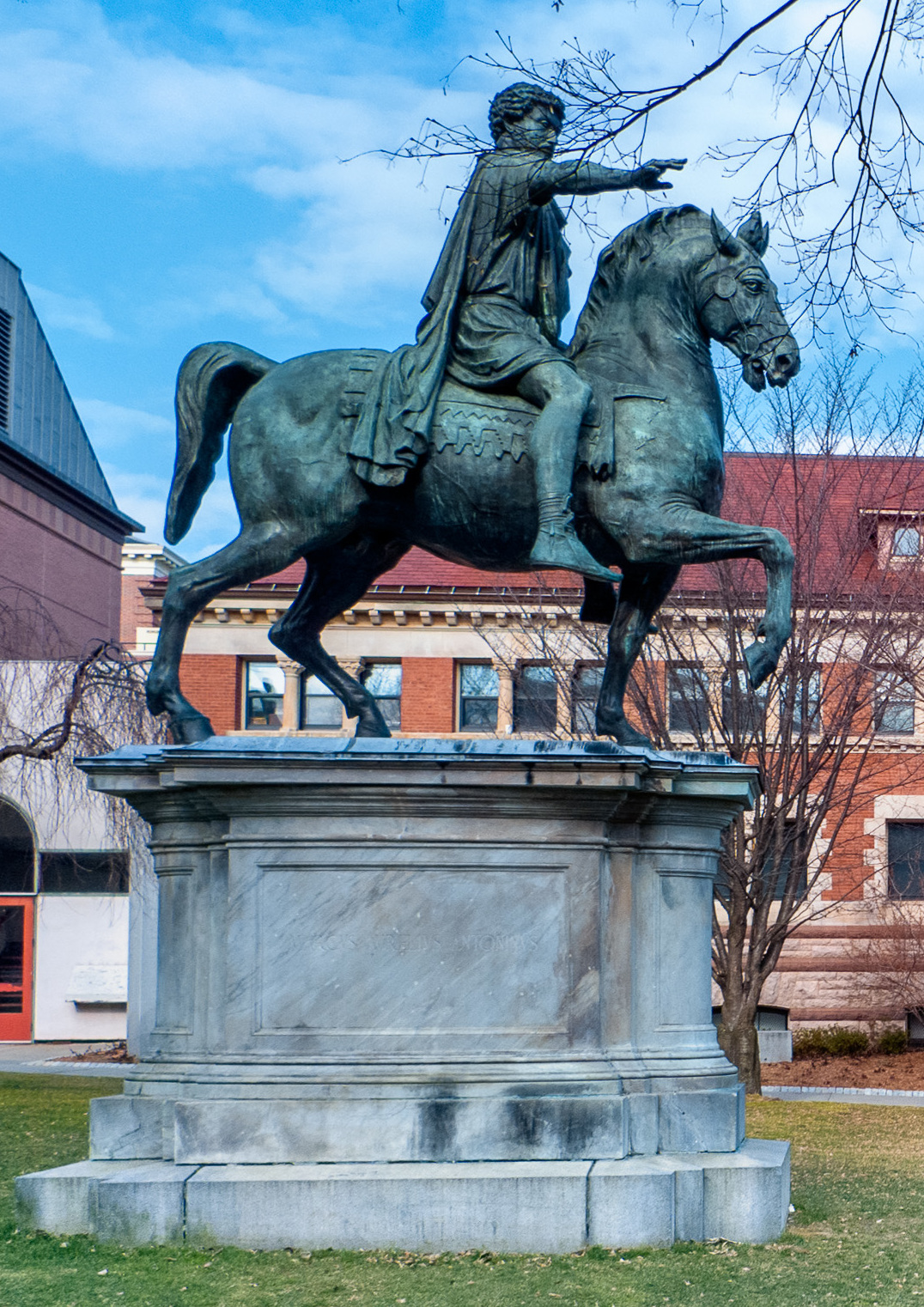
Marcus Aurelius

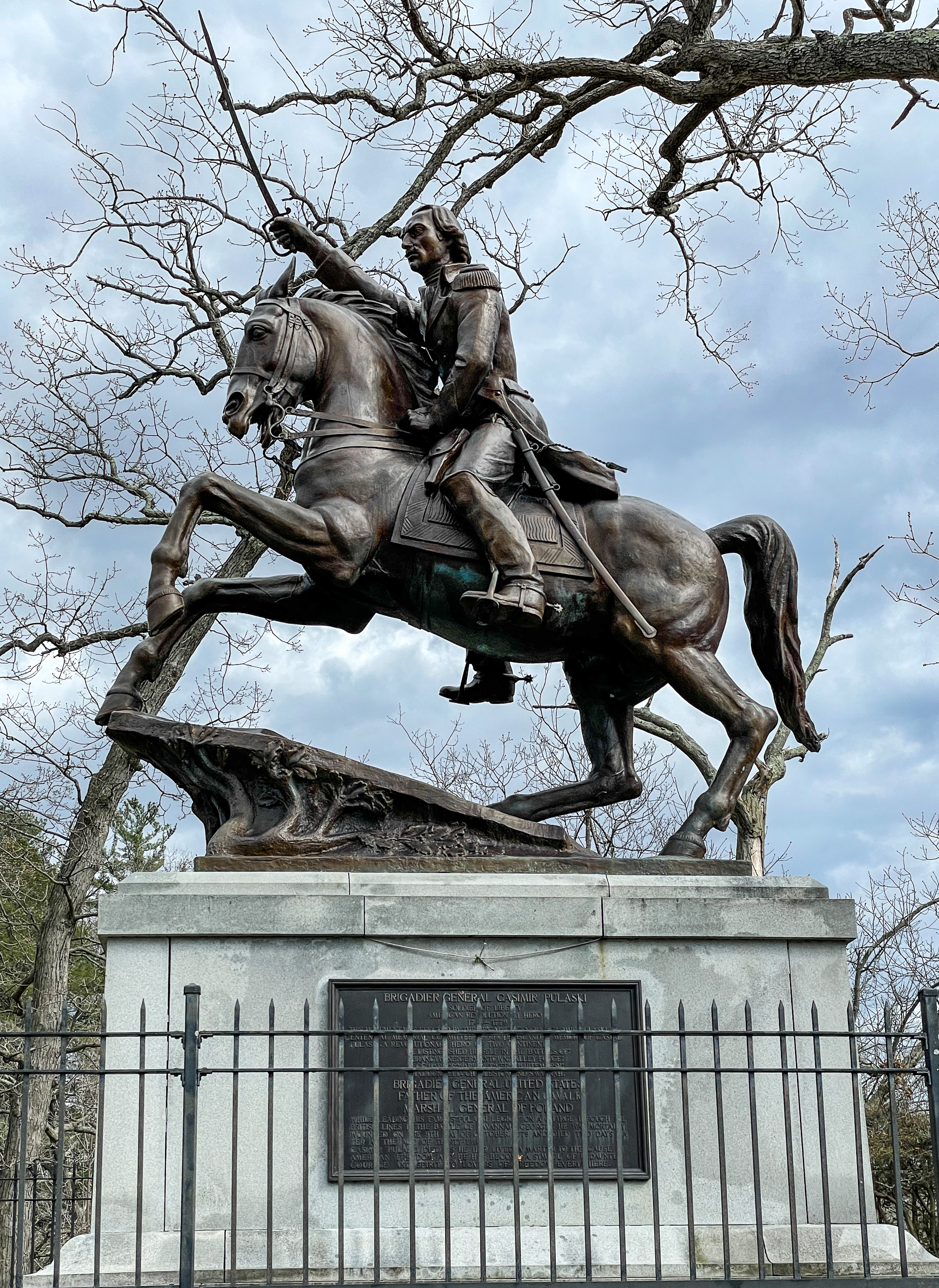
Pulaski

=== South Carolina ===
- Columbia
  - Wade Hampton III, by Frederick W. Ruckstull, South Carolina State House, 1903–06.
  - The Torch Bearers, by Anna Hyatt Huntington, Wardlaw College of Education, University of South Carolina, 1953, this cast 1963–65.
  - The Boy of The Waxhaws (Andrew Jackson), by Anna Hyatt Huntington, Garrett Gardens, Columbia College, 1967.
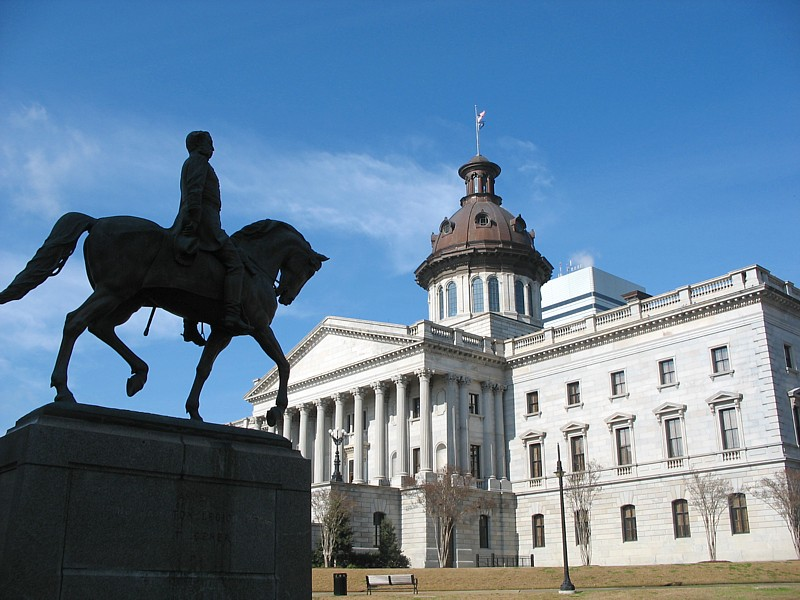
Hampton
- Lancaster
  - The Boy of The Waxhaws (Andrew Jackson), by Anna Hyatt Huntington, Andrew Jackson State Park, 1967.
- Murrells Inlet
  - Youth Taming the Wild, by Anna Hyatt Huntington, Brookgreen Gardens, 1927.
  - Riders of the Dawn, by Adolph A. Weinman, Brookgreen Gardens, ca. 1942.
  - Don Quichote, by Anna Hyatt Huntington, Brookgreen Gardens, 1946–47.
  - Pegasus, by Laura Gardin Fraser, Brookgreen Gardens, 1946–54.
  - Fighting Stallions, by Anna Hyatt Huntington, Brookgreen Gardens, 1950.
  - Sancho Panza, by Carl Paul Jennewein, Brookgreen Gardens, 1971.
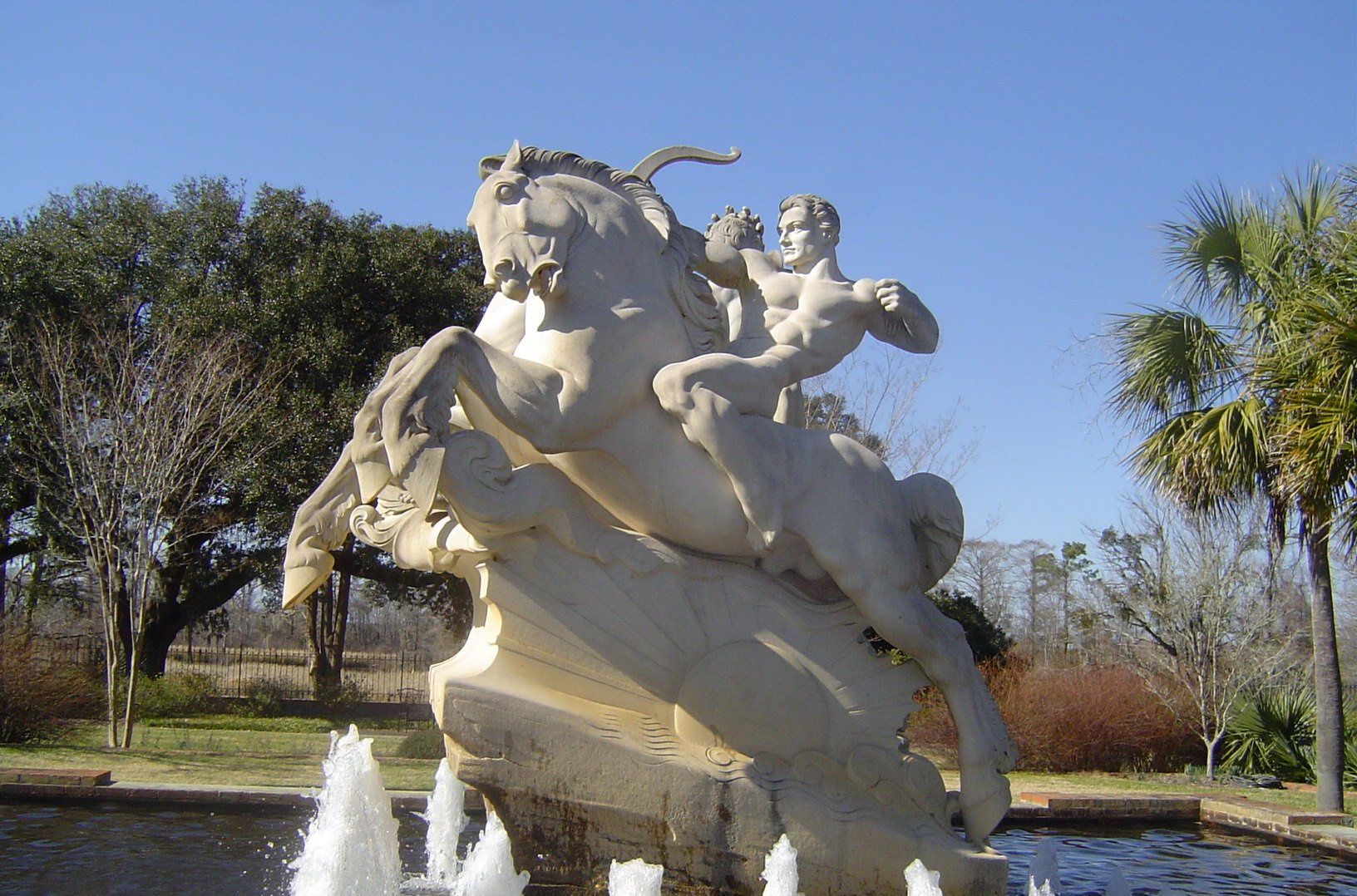
Riders of the Dawn

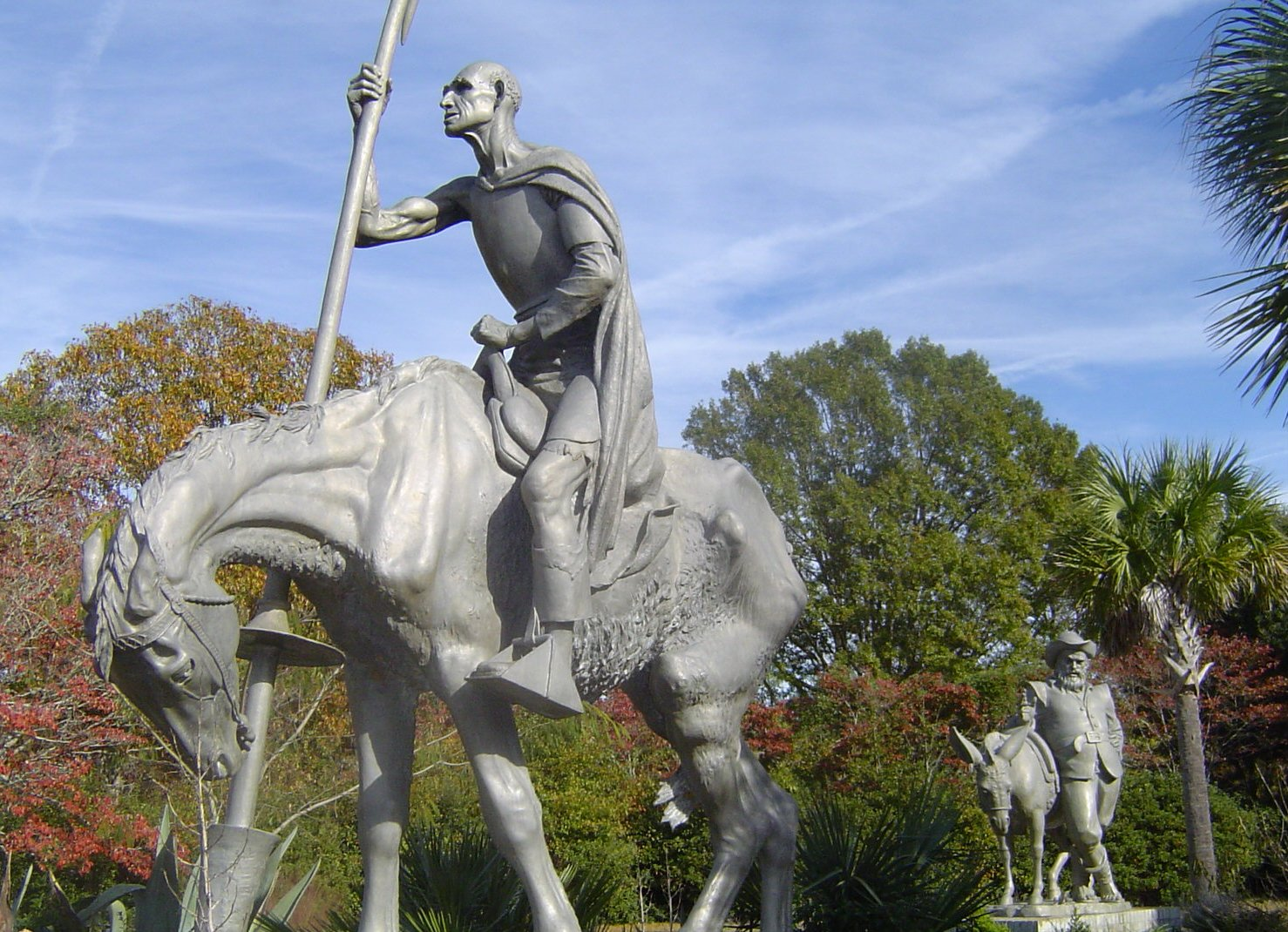
Don Quichote and Sancho Panza

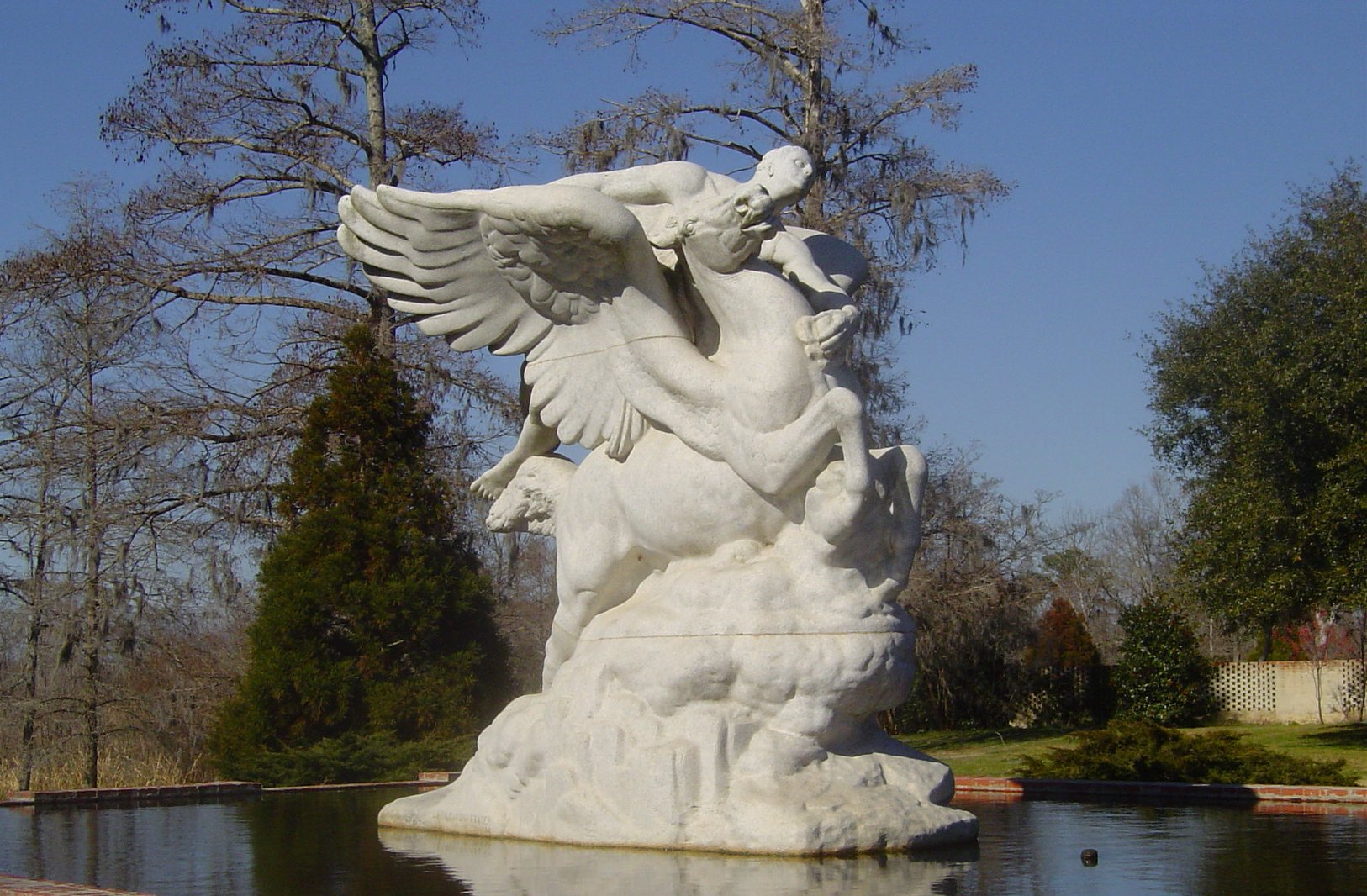
Pegasus

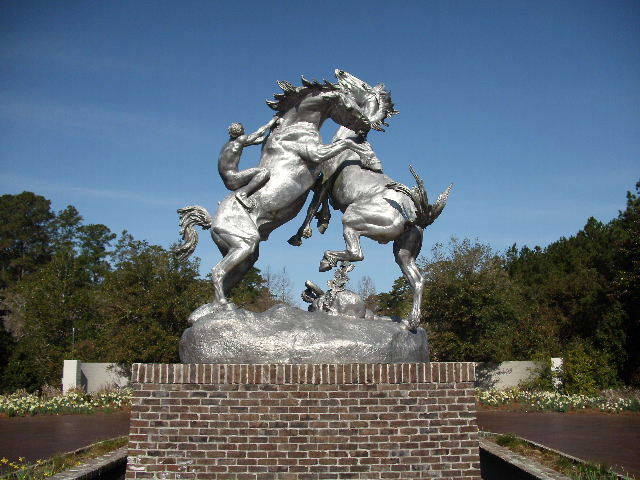
Fighting Stallions

=== South Dakota ===
- Belle Fourche
  - Lasting Legacy, by Tony R. Chytka, 5th Avenue & National Street, 1989.
- Custer County
  - The Spirit of Crazy Horse (work in progress), by Korczak Ziolkowski, Crazy Horse Memorial, Thunderhead Mountain, begun 1948. Approximately 563 feet (172 m) tall and 641 feet (195 m) wide.
- Pierre
  - Fighting Stallions, by Korczak Ziolkowski, 500 E Capitol Ave, Pierre, SD, April 19, 1994/1935.

=== Tennessee ===
- Memphis
  - Pony Express, by Avard Fairbanks, Promus Companies, 1983
  - Nathan Bedford Forrest Monument by Charles Henry Niehaus 1905, removed, present location unknown
- Nashville
  - Nathan Bedford Forrest Equestrian Statue by Jack Kershaw, dedicated July 11, 1998. Located on south of Nashville beside I-65 North.
- Palmyra
  - Andrew Jackson, by Enoch Tanner Wickham, 1961.
  - Dr. John W. Wickham, by Enoch Tanner Wickham, 1959.

=== Texas ===
- Austin
  - Monument to Terry's Texas Rangers, by Pompeo Coppini, Texas State Capitol, 1901–07.
  - Littlefield Memorial Fountain, by Pompeo Coppini, University of Texas at Austin, 1919–33.
  - The Cowboy, by Constance Whitney Warren, Texas State Capitol, 1921–25.
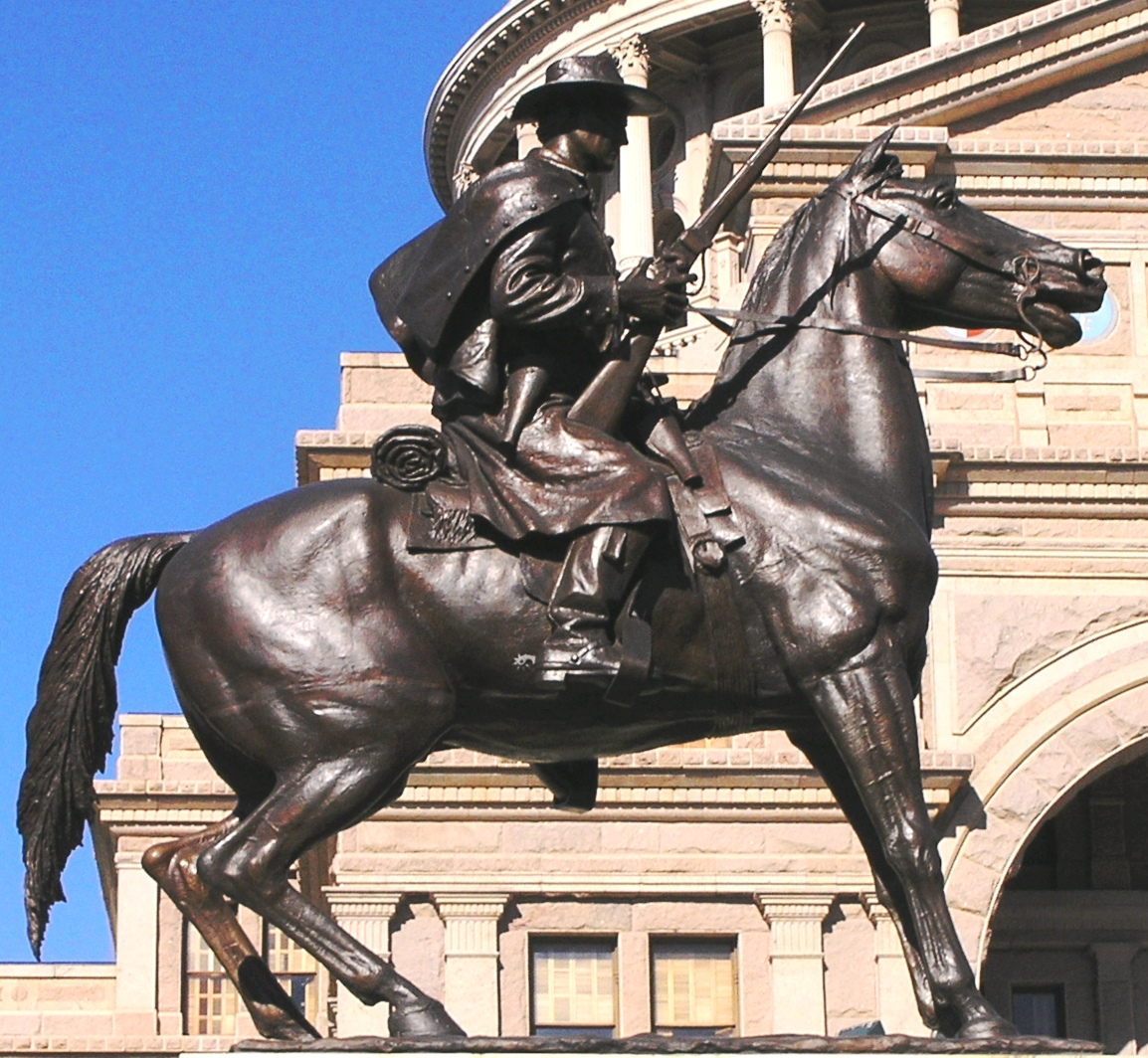
Texas Rangers

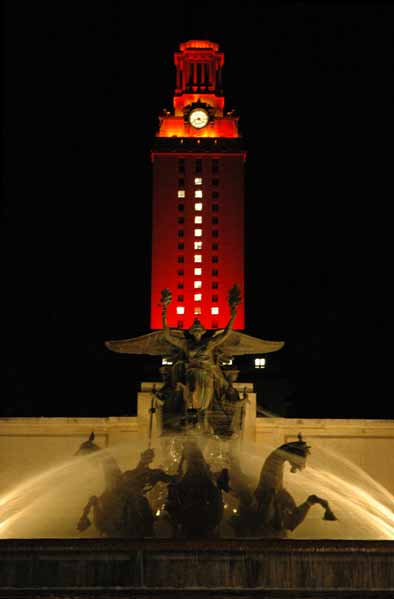
Littlefield Fountain

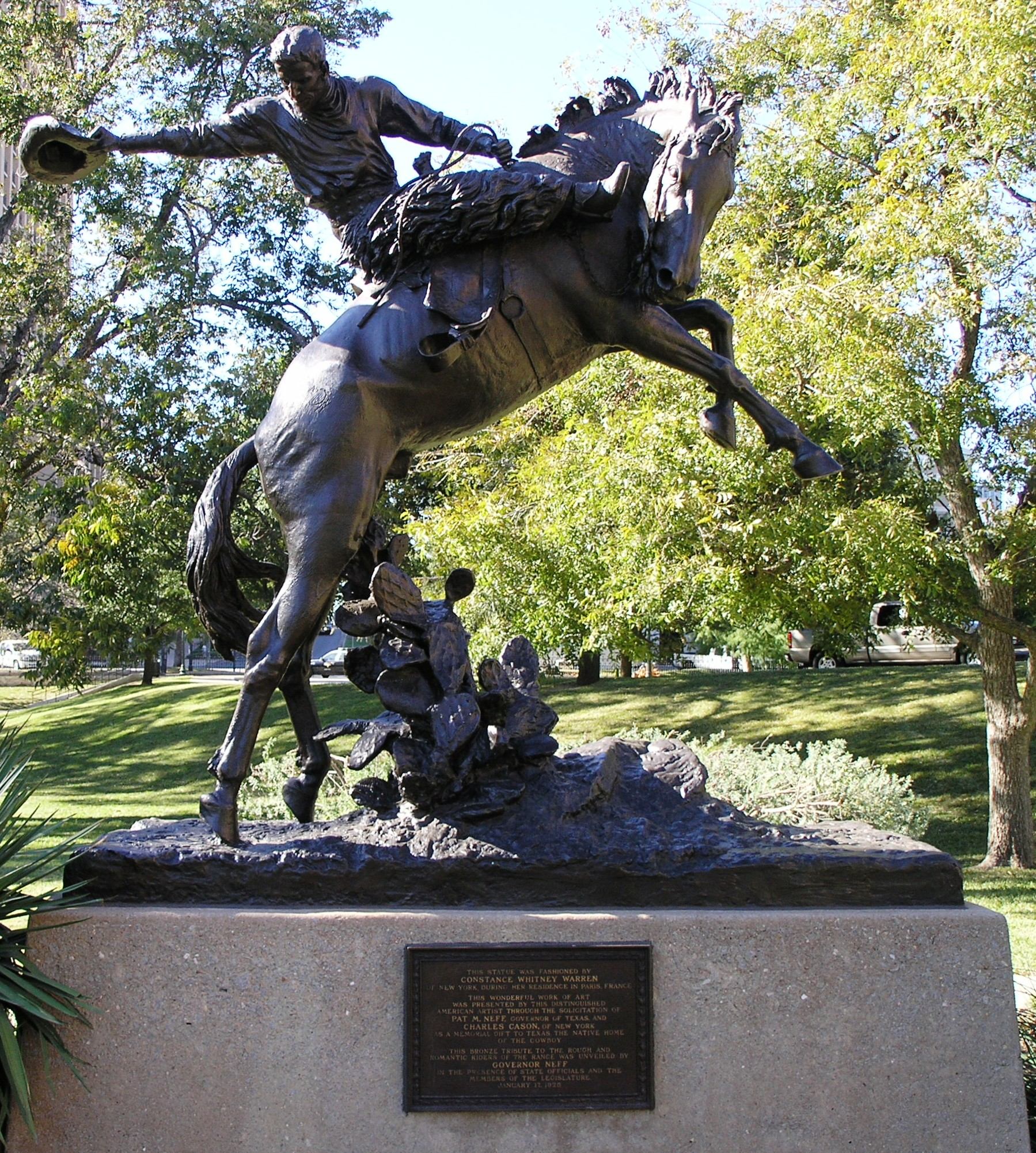
Cowboy Memorial
- Ballinger
  - Spirit of the Texas Cowboy (1917–19), by Pompeo Coppini, Charles H. Noyes Memorial, Courthouse Square.
- Clifton
  - On the Banks of the Bosque (2007), by Bruce R. Greene, Heritage Plaza.
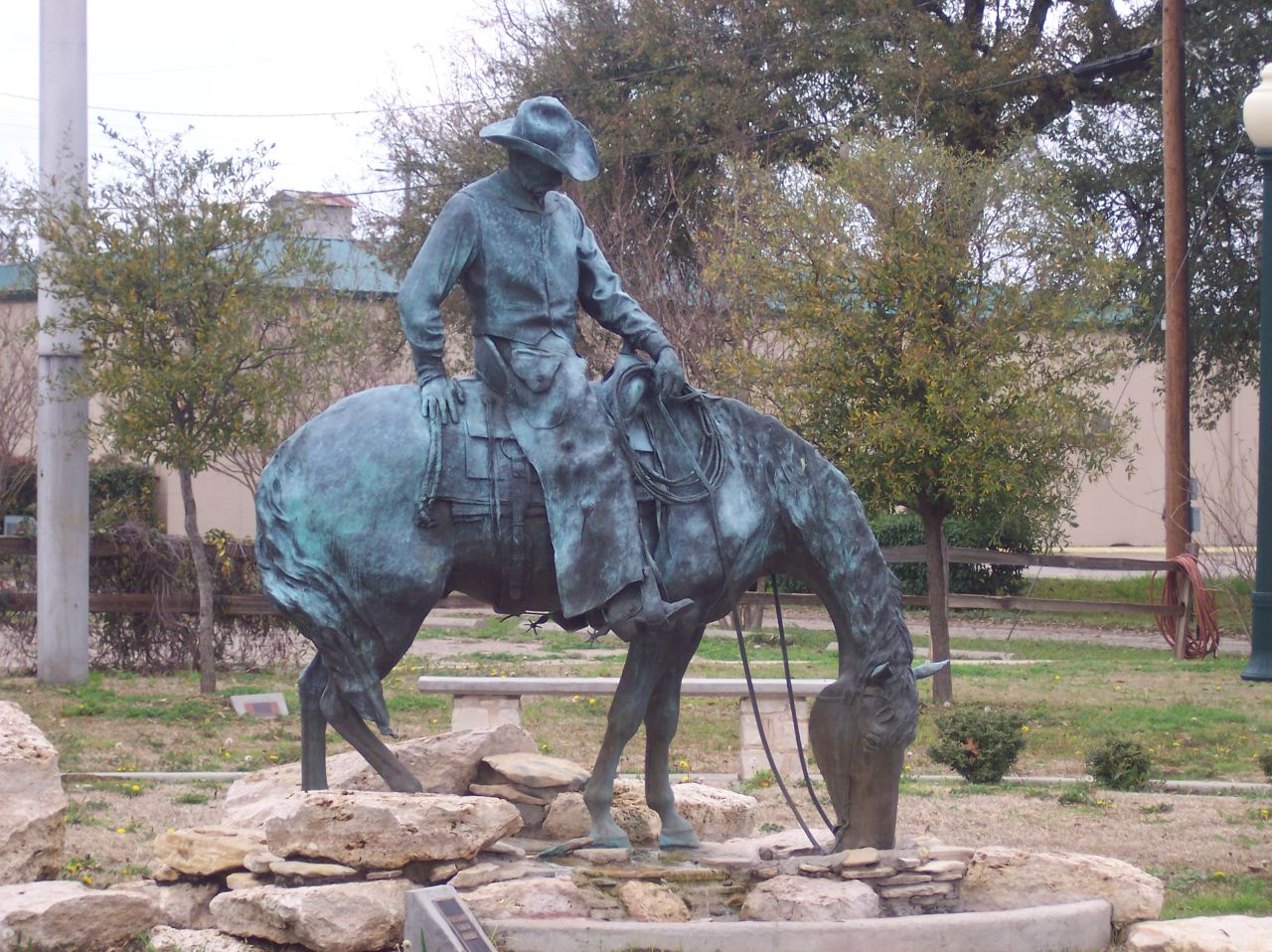
On the Banks of the Bosque (2007), by Bruce R. Greene, Heritage Plaza.
- Dallas
  - Riding Into the Sunset (Will Rogers), by Electra Waggoner Biggs, Loews Anatole Hotel, 1941, this cast 1989. A replica of Biggs's statue in Fort Worth, Texas.
- Denton
  - Diego Velazques, by Constance Whitney Warren, University of North Texas, 1924.
- El Paso
  - The Errand of Corporal Ross, by Bob Snead, Buffalo Soldiers Memorial, Fort Bliss, 1999.
  - Juan de Oñate "The Equestrian" Monument, by John Sherrill Houser, El Paso International Airport, 2006. Height: 36 ft. (11 m)
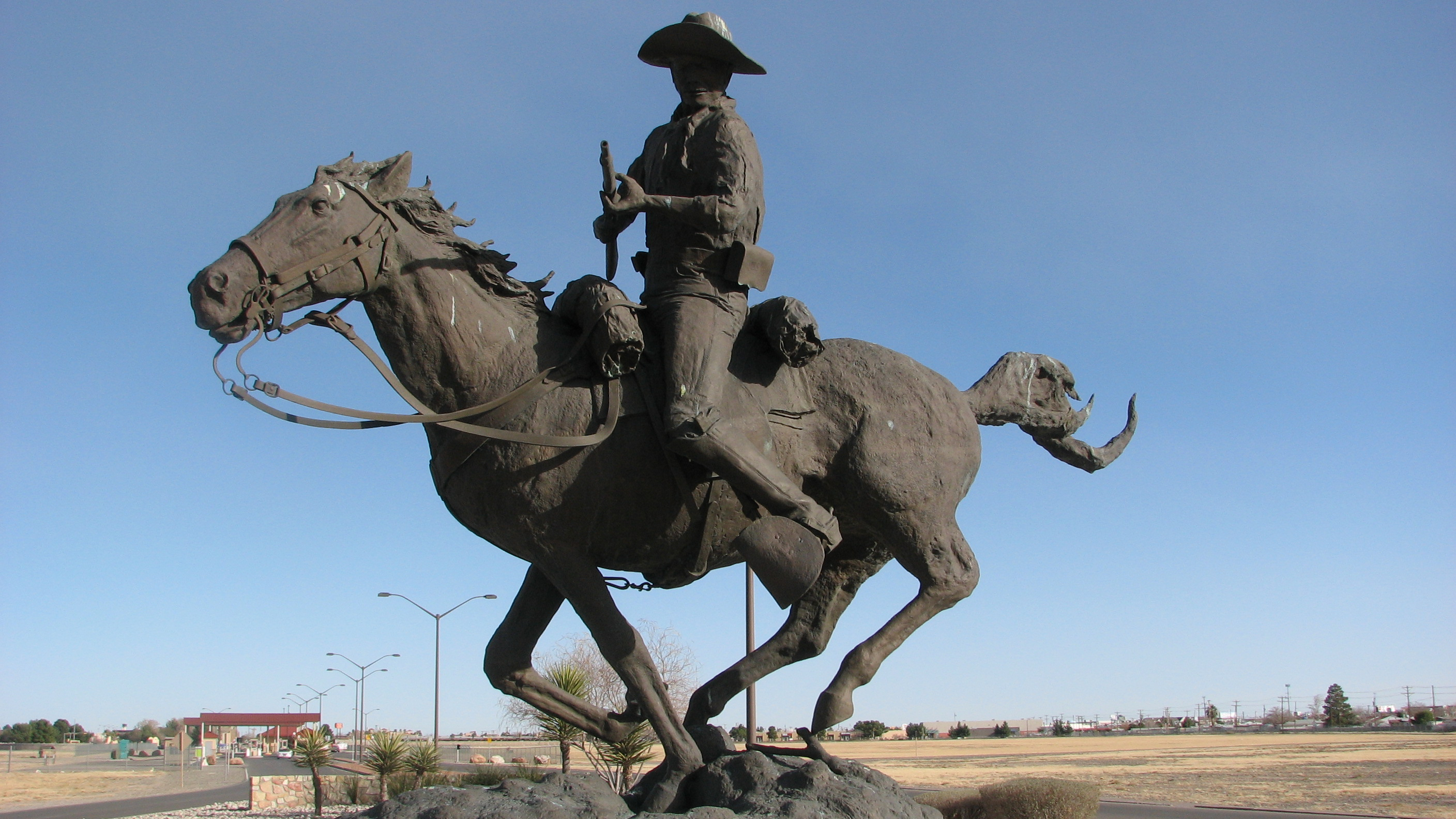
Buffalo Soldiers Memorial
- Fort Worth
  - Riding Into the Sunset (Will Rogers), by Electra Waggoner Biggs, Will Rogers Memorial Center, late-1930s–1942.
  - Texas Gold, by T.D. Kelsey, Texas Longhorn Breeders Association of America, 1984. A lifesize sculpture group of a horse and rider with seven longhorn steer.
  - High Desert Princess, by Mehl Lawson, National Cowgirl Museum and Hall of Fame, 2003.
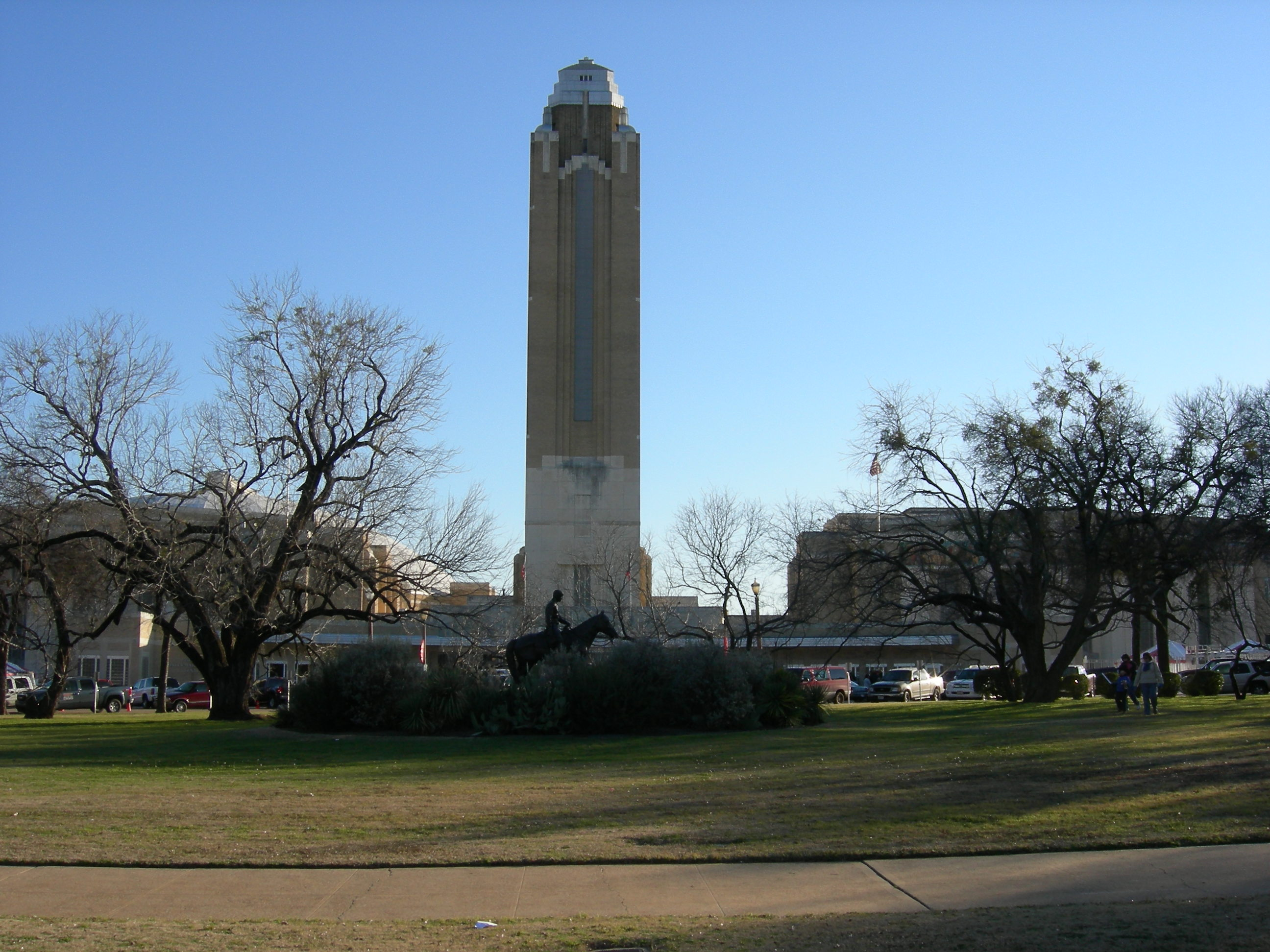
Will Rogers Center
- Houston
  - Sam Houston, by Enrico Filiberto Cerracchio, Hermann Park, 1925.
  - The Pilgrim, by Marino Marini, Houston Museum of Fine Arts, 1939.
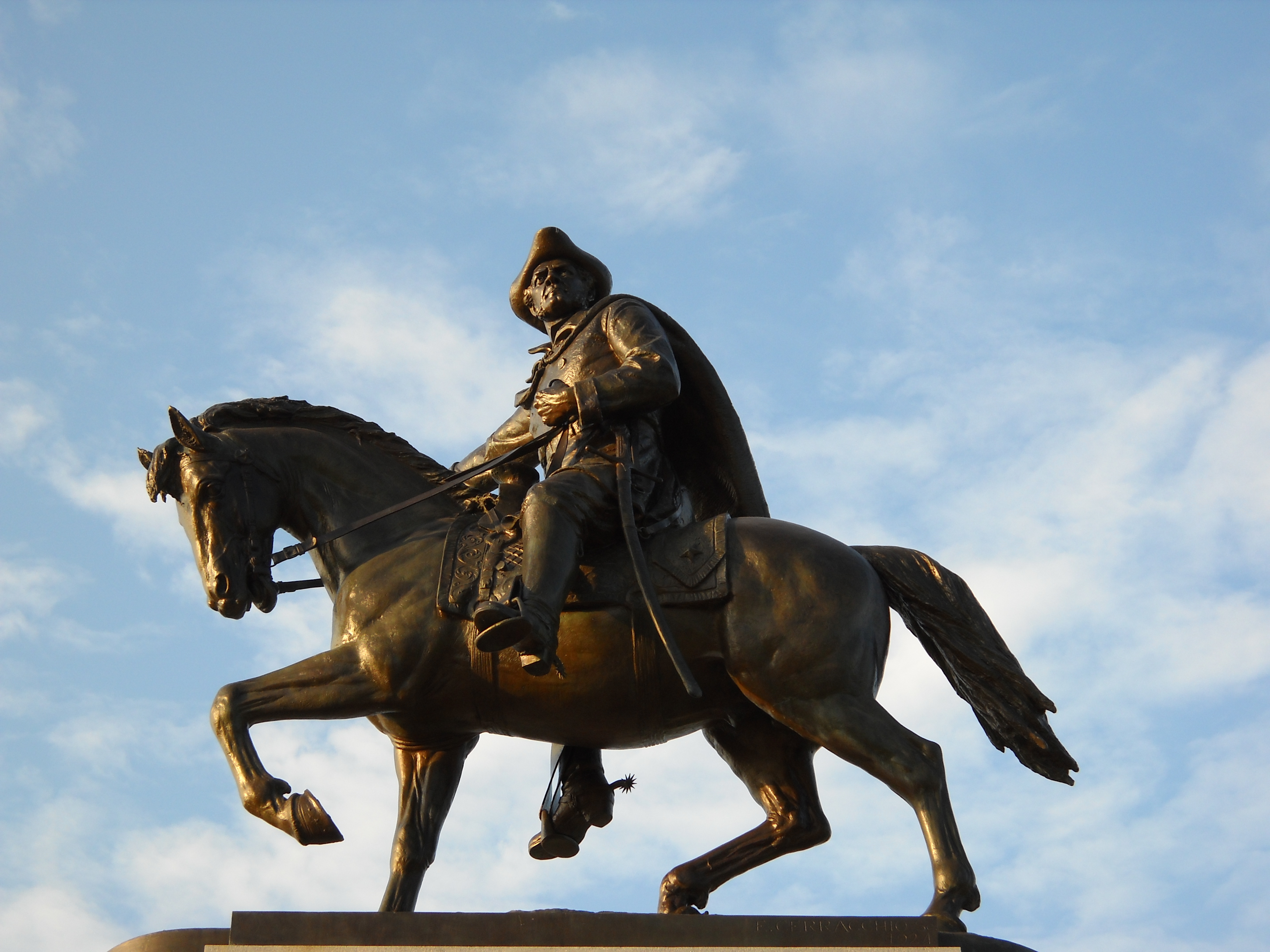
Sam Houston
- Hunt
  - Forever We'll Ride (2009), by Bruce R. Greene, Tejas Vanqueros Campground.
- Lubbock
  - Riding Into the Sunset (Will Rogers), by Electra Waggoner Biggs, Texas Tech University, 1941–48.
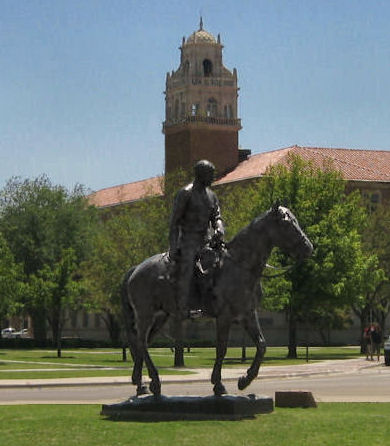
    Rogers
- Terlinga
  - Robert E. Lee on Traveller, by Alexander Phimister Proctor, 1936.

=== Utah ===
- St. George
  - The Rebels, by Jerry Anderson, Dixie College, 1985–87.
  - Jacob Hamblin and Indian Child, by Angelo Caravaglia, Dixie College, 1986–91.
- Salt Lake City
  - This Is the Place Monument, equestrian bas-reliefs by Mahonri Mackintosh Young and Spero Anargyros, This Is the Place Heritage Park, 1945–47.
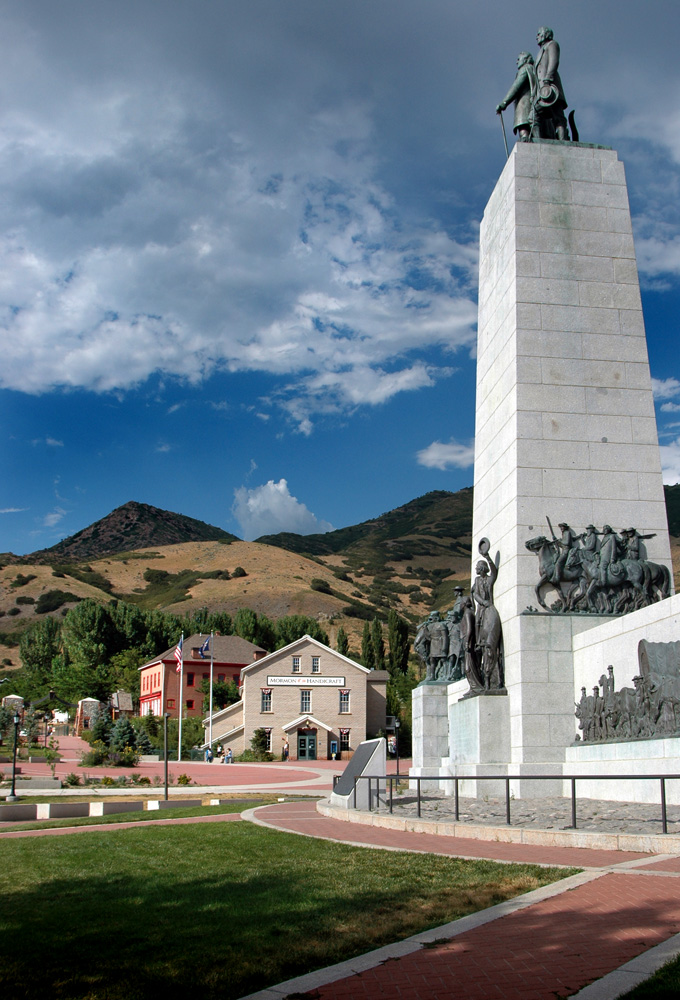
This Is the Place Monument
- Springville
  - Mountain Man, by Angelo Caravaglia, Springville Museum of Art, 1982–86. The museum also has a collection of works by Cyrus Edwin Dallin.
  - Sixty Years in the Saddle, by Scott Myers, South & Main Streets, 1992–93.

=== Vermont ===
- Bennington
  - Civil War Memorial (Bronze bas-relief plaque of marching soldiers), by William Gordon Huff, outside Bennington Museum, 1930.

=== Virginia ===
- Arlington
  - Philip Kearny, by Edward Clark Potter, Arlington National Cemetery, 1912–14.
  - Field Marshal Sir John Dill, by Herbert Haseltine, Arlington National Cemetery, 1950.
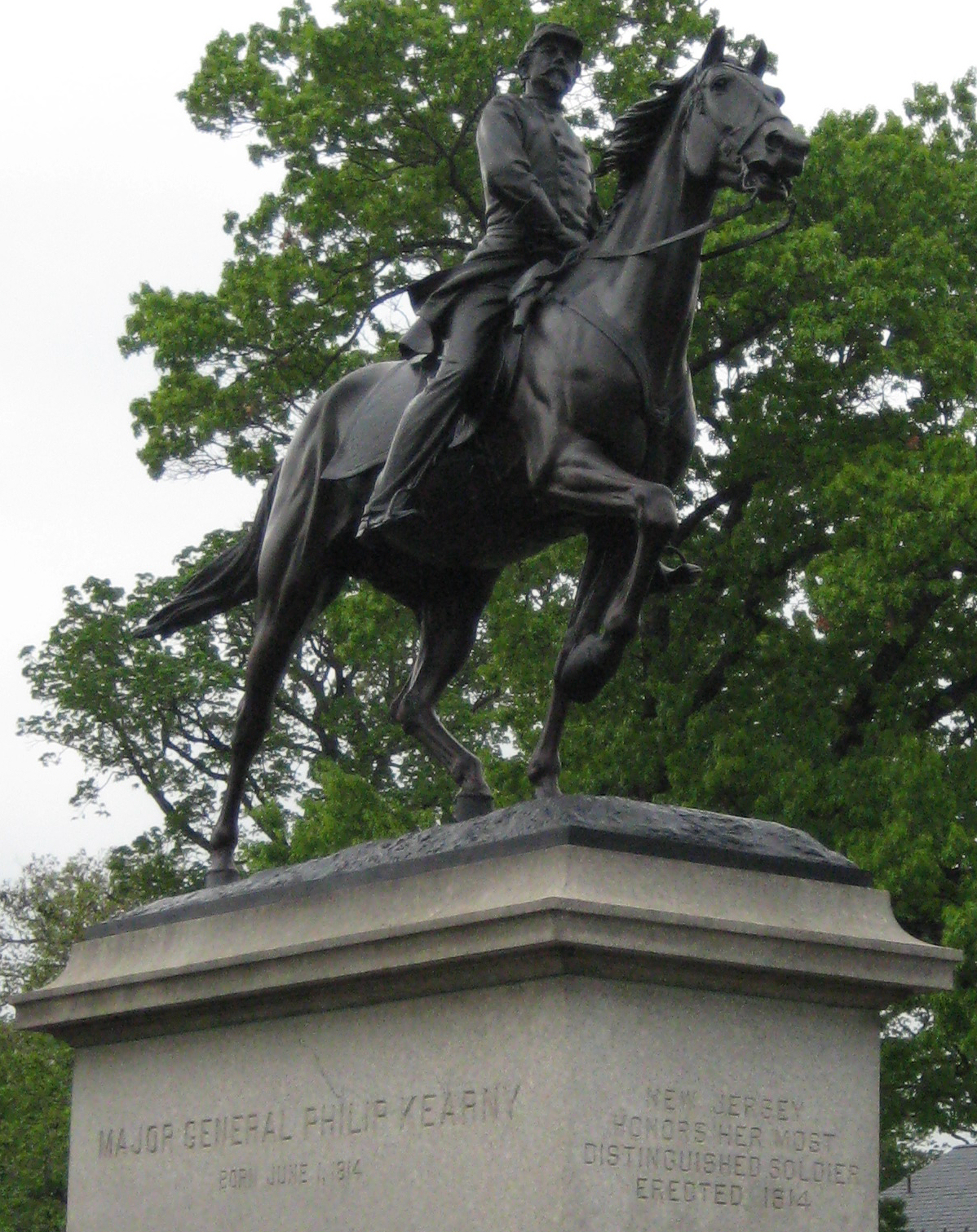
Kearny

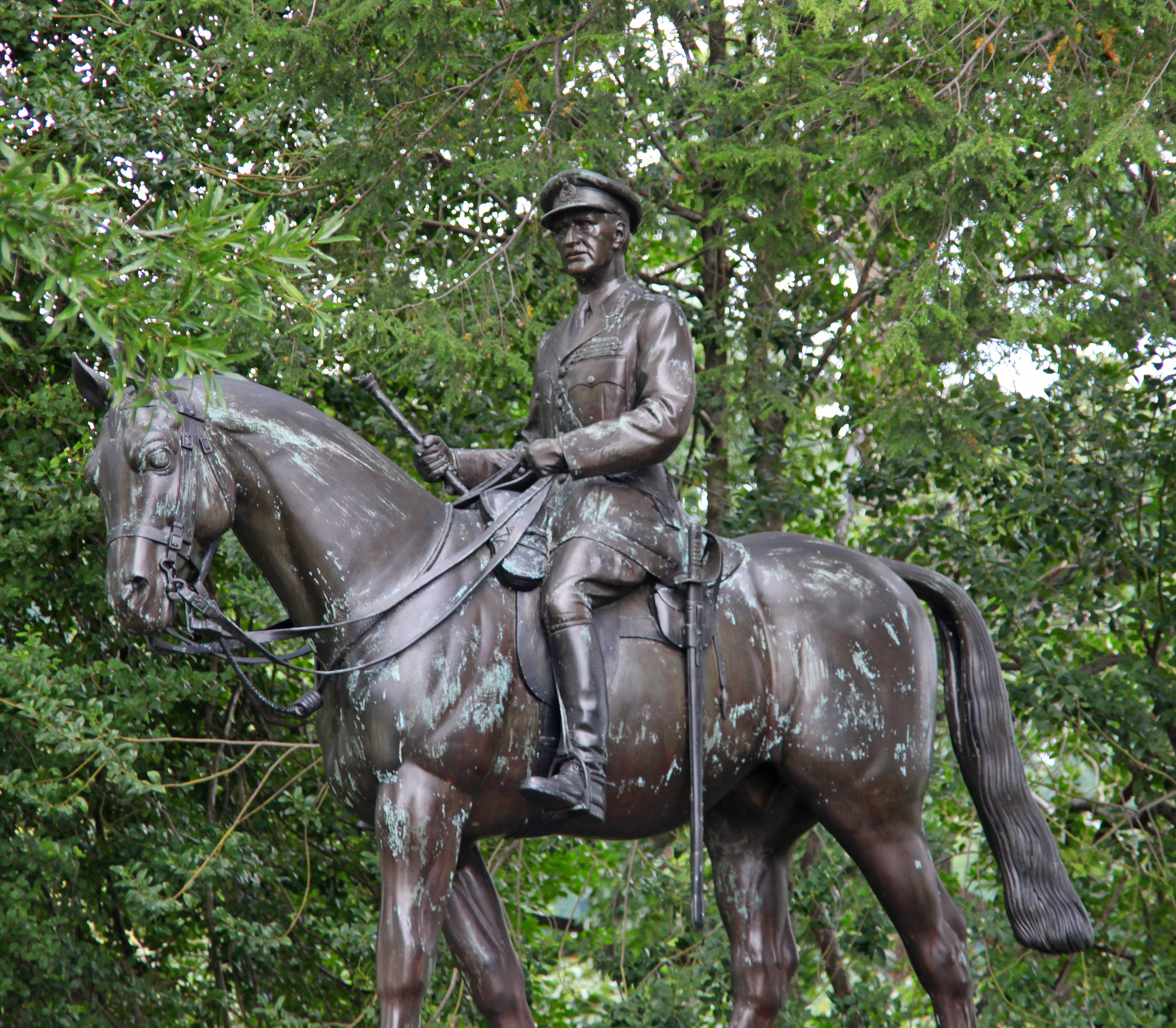
Dill
- Charlottesville
  - George Rogers Clark, by Robert Aitken, University of Virginia, 1921.
  - Stonewall Jackson, by Charles Keck, Jackson Park, 1921.
  - Robert E. Lee, by Henry Shrady, completed by Leo Lentelli, Lee Park, 1924.
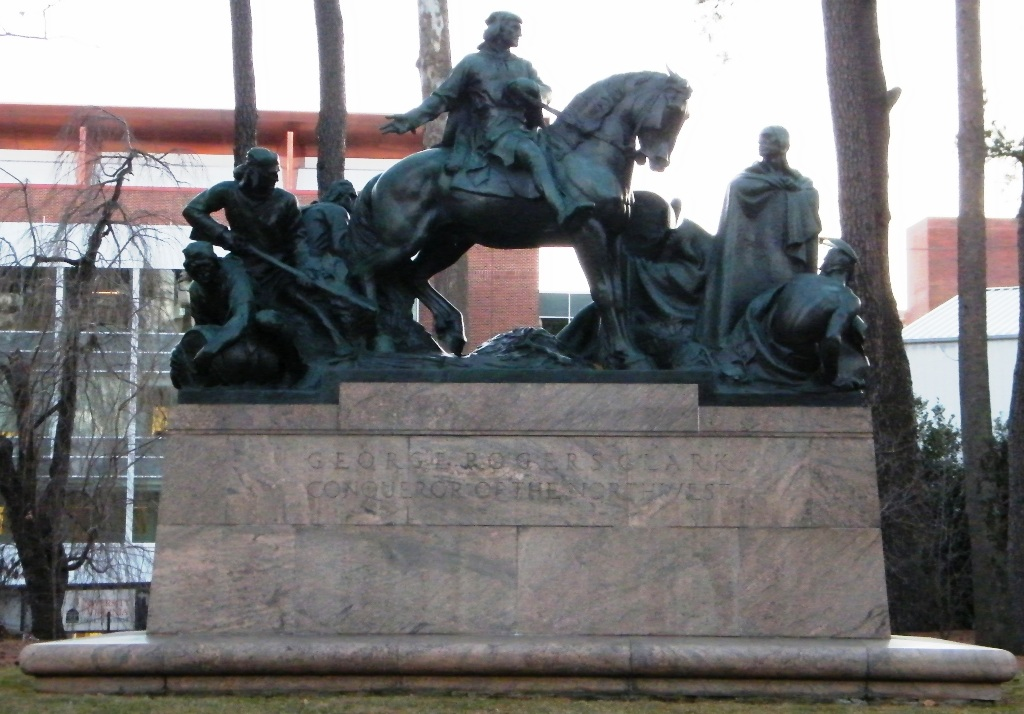
Clark

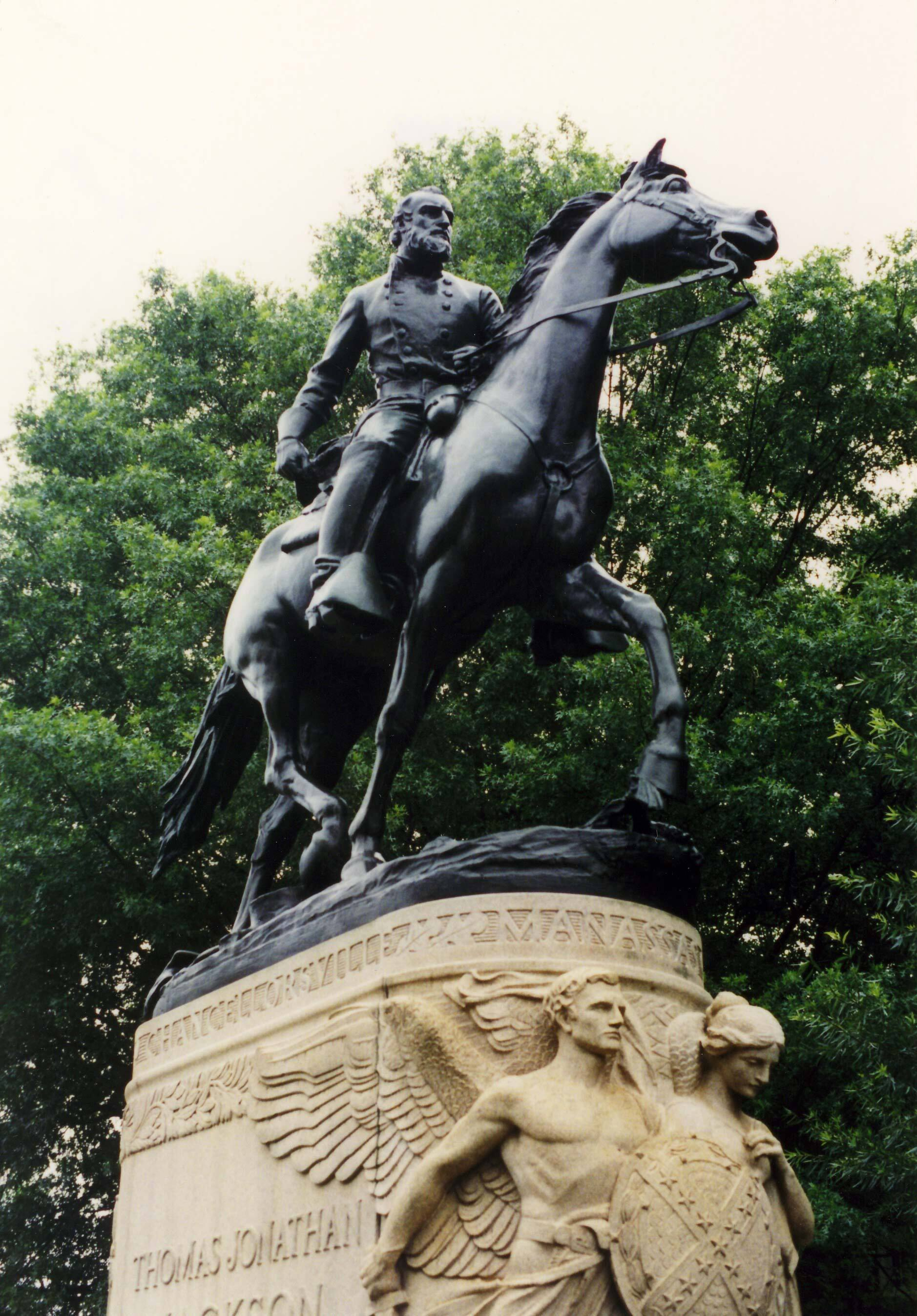
Jackson

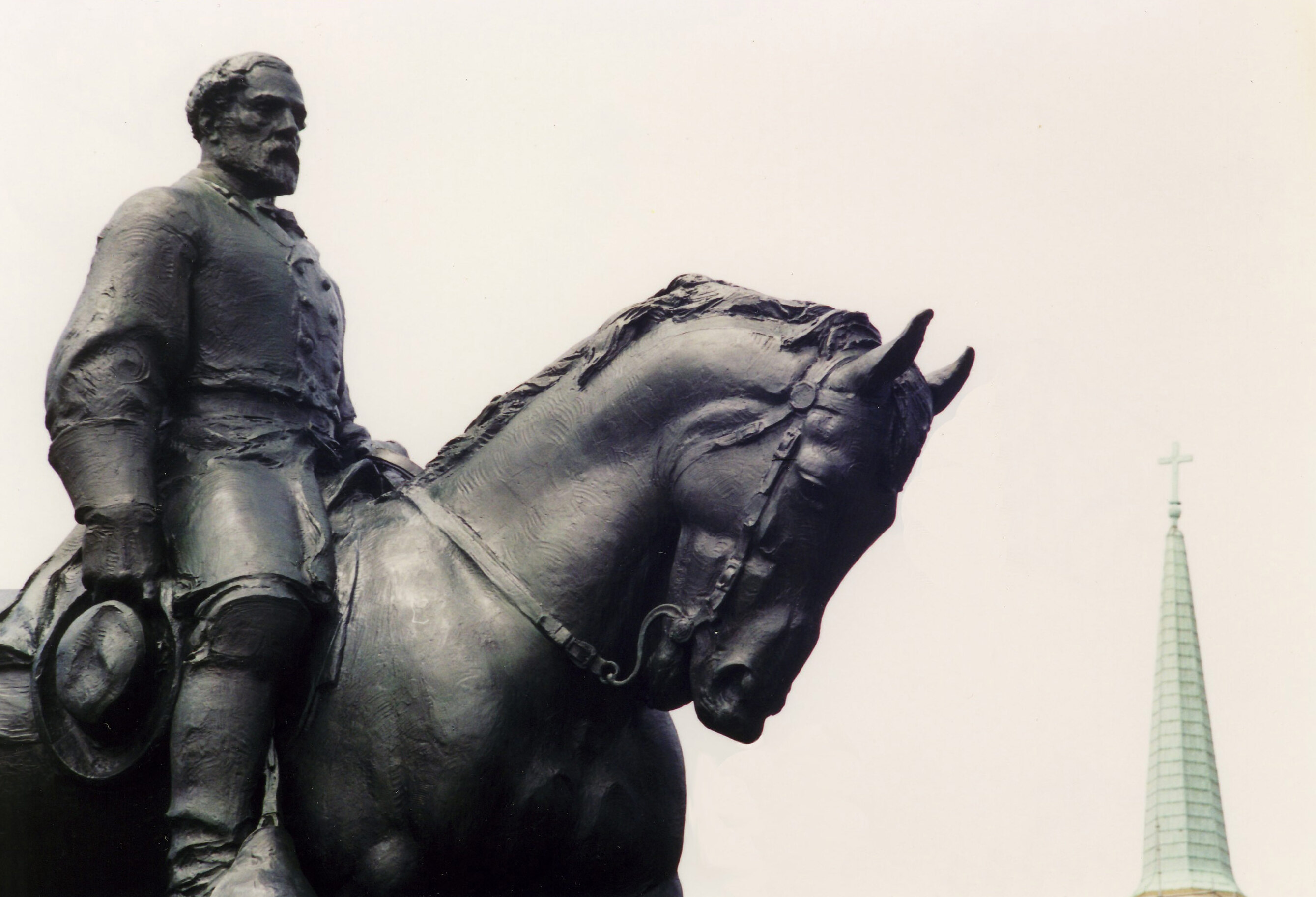
Lee
- Manassas
  - "Stonewall" Jackson, by Joseph Pollia, Henry Hill, Manassas National Battlefield Park, 1940.
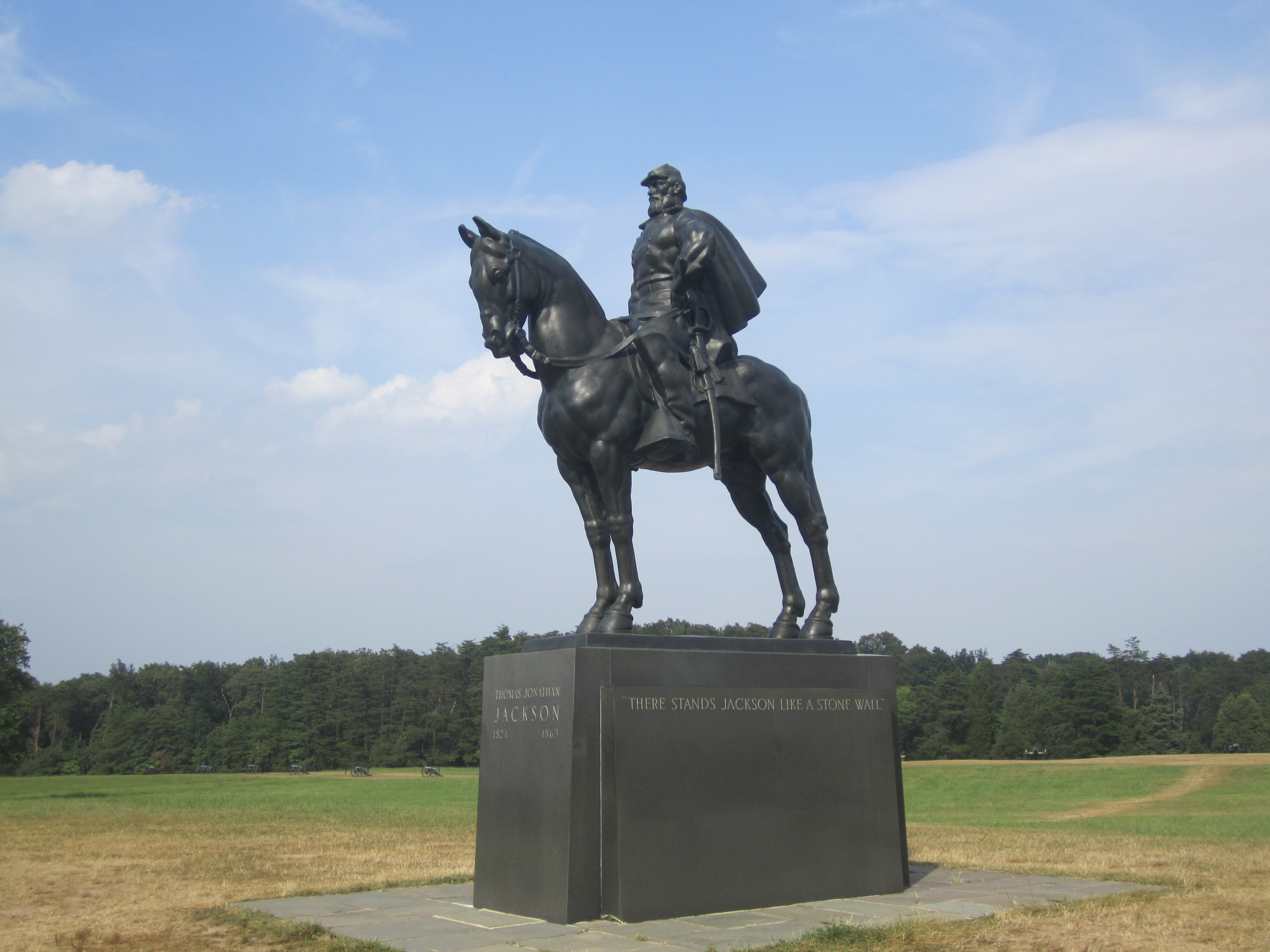
"Stonewall" Jackson
- Newport News
  - Youth Conquering the Wild by Anna Hyatt Huntington, Mariners' Museum, 1927, this cast 1930.
- Norfolk
  - The Torch Bearers, by Anna Hyatt Huntington, Chrysler Museum of Art, 1953, this cast 1956–57.
- Richmond
  - Rumors of War, Kehinde Wiley, Virginia Museum of Fine Arts, 2019.
  - Washington Monument, Thomas Crawford, 1857.
- The following statues are located on Monument Avenue.
  - Robert E. Lee - REMOVED 2021, by Antonin Mercié, 1890.
  - JEB Stuart - REMOVED 2021, by Frederick Moynihan, 1907.
  - Stonewall Jackson - REMOVED 2021, by Frederick William Sievers, 1919.
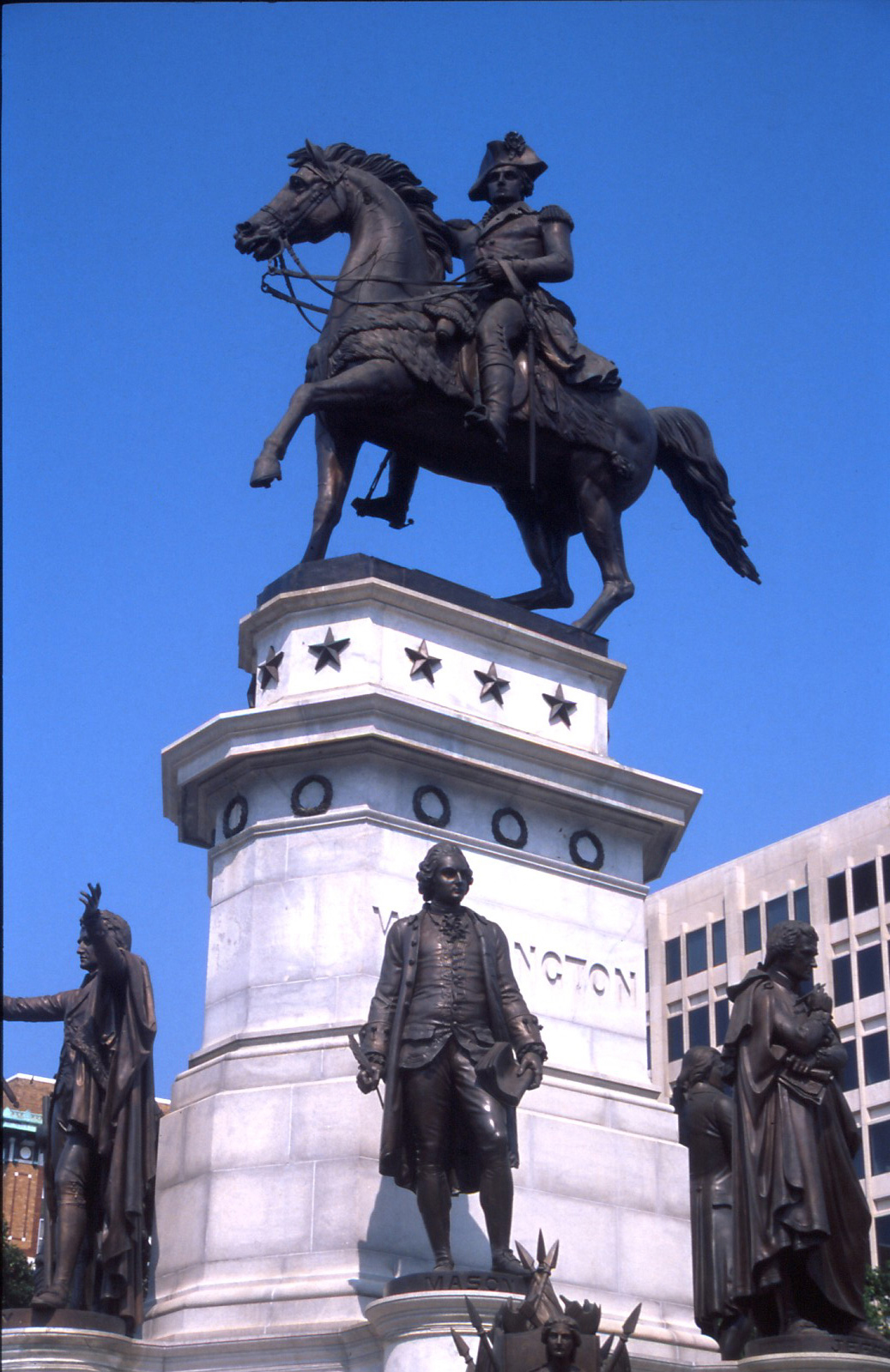
Washington

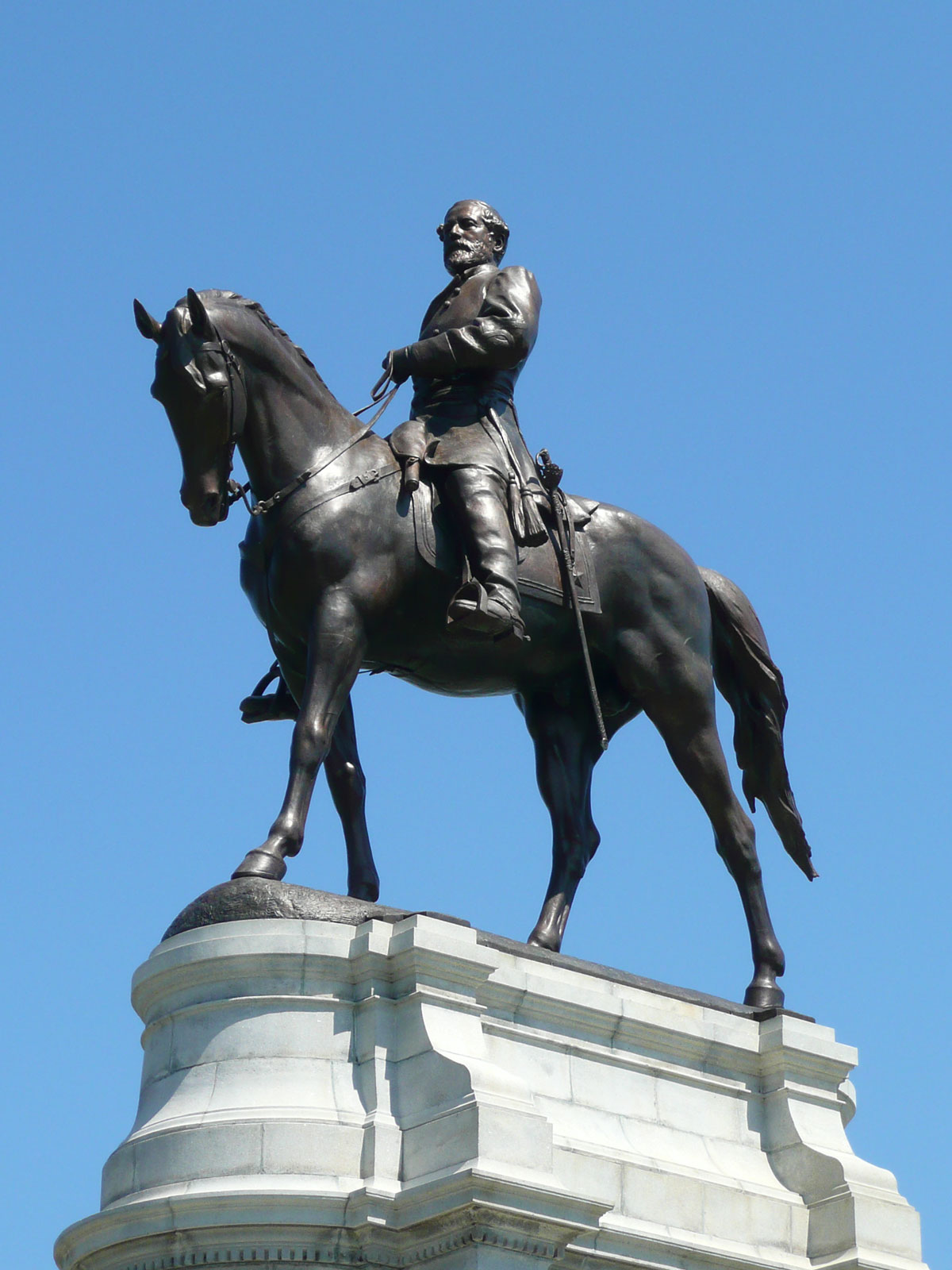
Lee - GONE

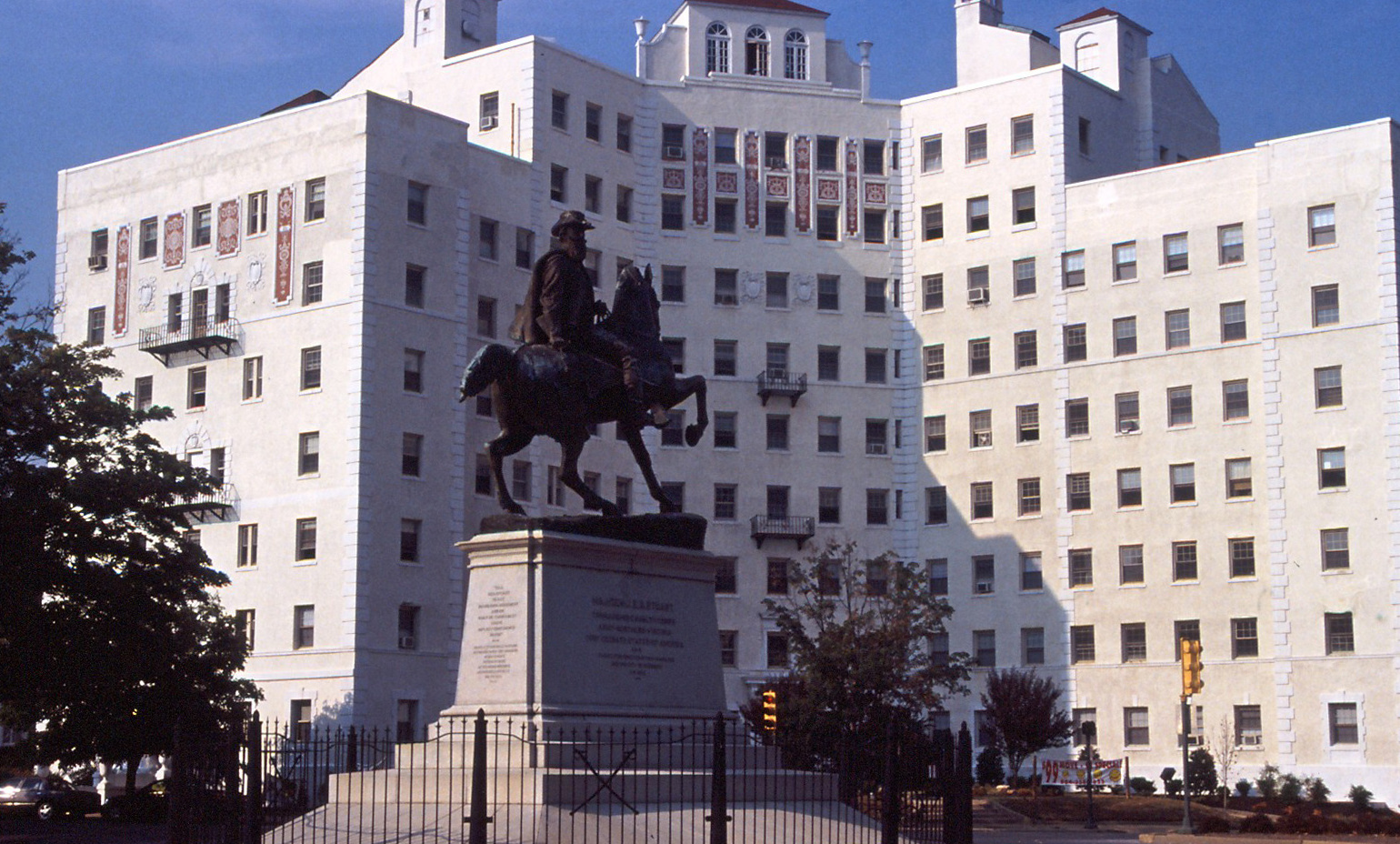
Stuart - GONE

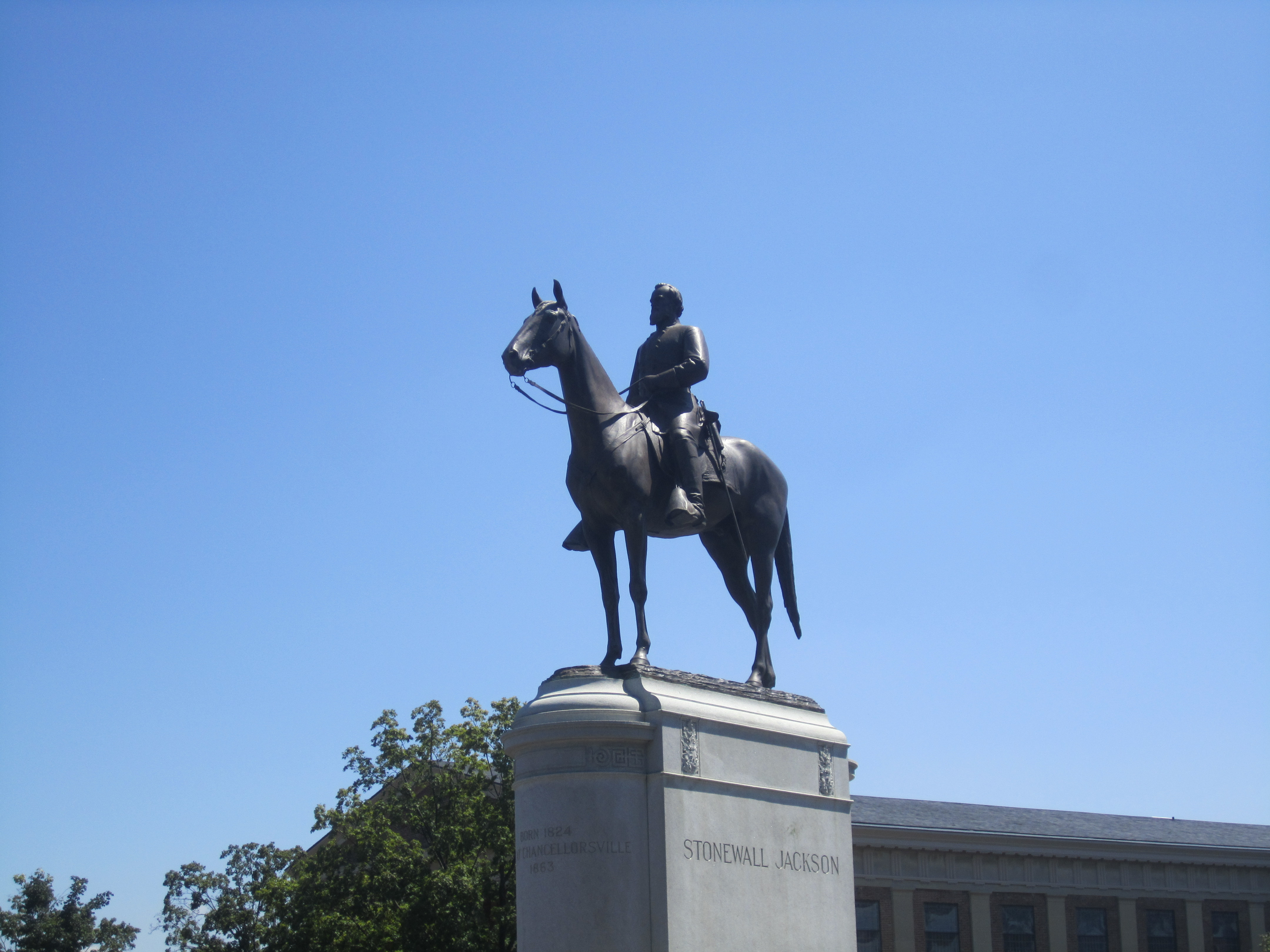
Jackson - GONE

=== Washington ===
- Vantage
  - Grandfather Cuts Loose the Ponies by David Govedare 1989, 15 galloping horses located on a ridge overlooking the Columbia River

=== West Virginia ===
- Charleston
  - Henry Gassaway Davis, by Louis Saint-Lanne, Davis Park, 1926.
- Clarksburg
- "Stonewall" Jackson, by Charles Keck, Harrison County Courthouse, 1921, this cast 1953. A replica of Keck's statue in Charlottesville, Virginia.
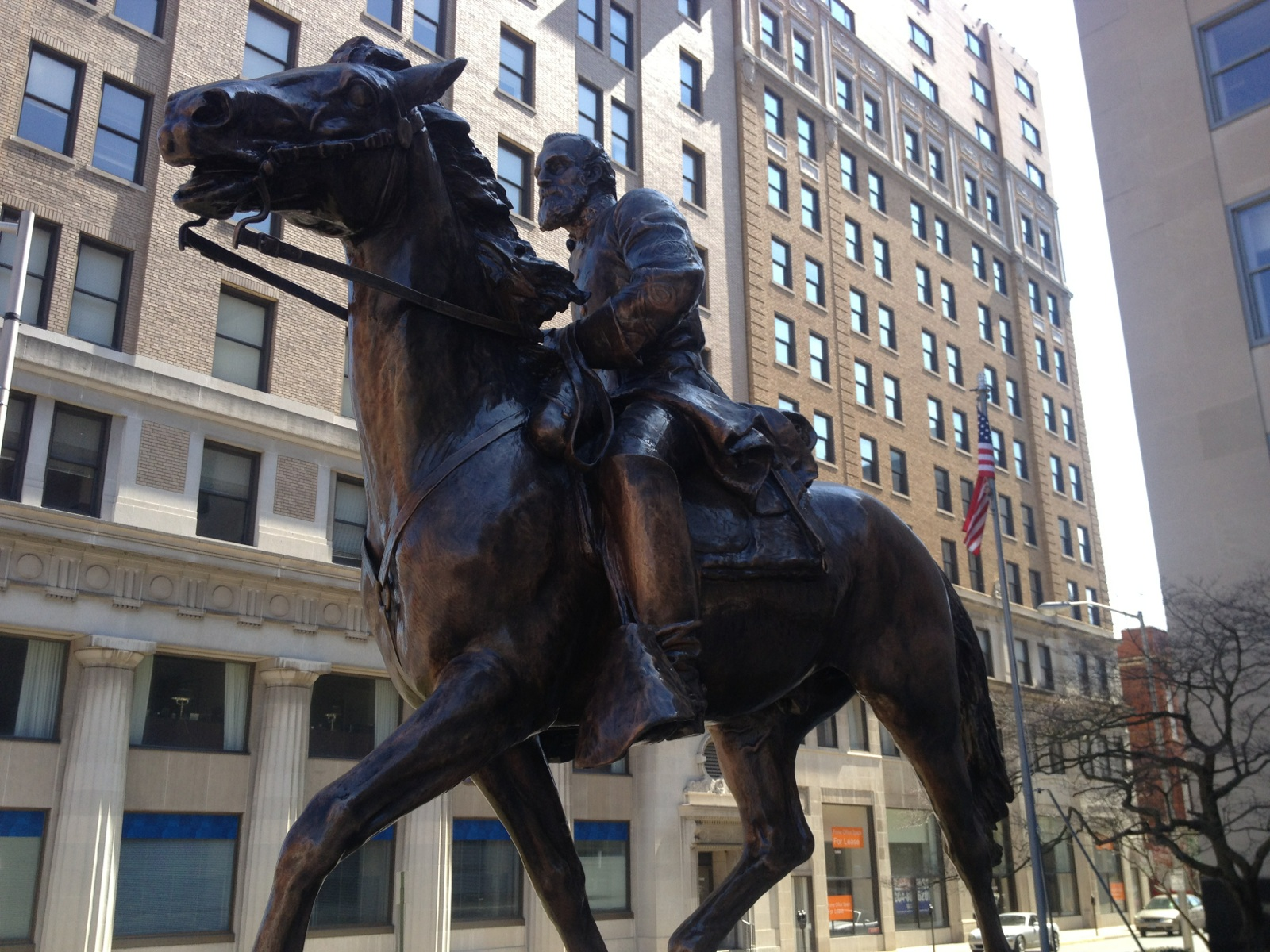
Stonewall Jackson

=== Wisconsin ===
- Milwaukee
  - General Thaddeus Kosciuszko, by Gaetano Trentanove, Kosciuszko Park, 1906.
  - Brigadier General Erastus B. Wolcott, by Francis Herman Packer, Lake Park, 1920.
  - Baron Friedrich Wilhelm von Steuben, by J. Otto Schweizer, West Lisbon Avenue, 1921.
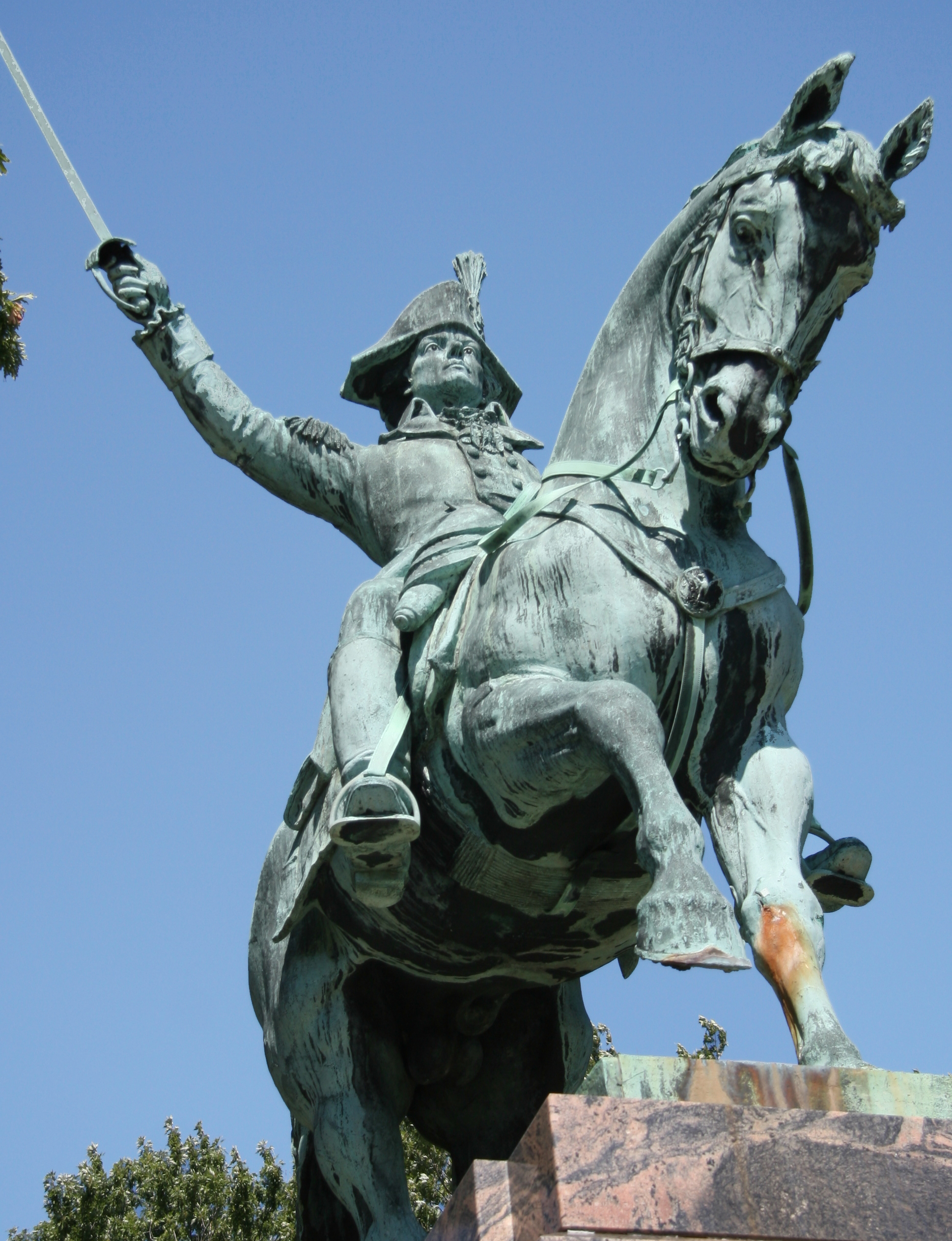
Kosciuszko

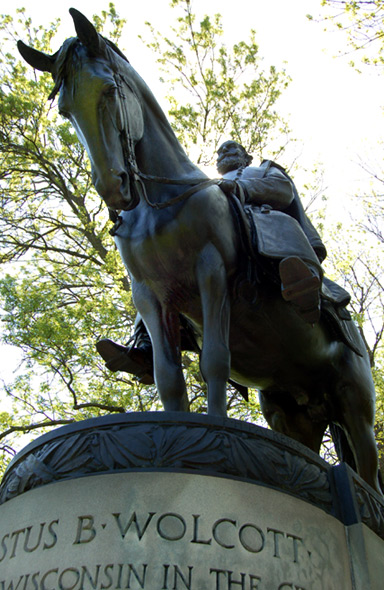
Wolcott

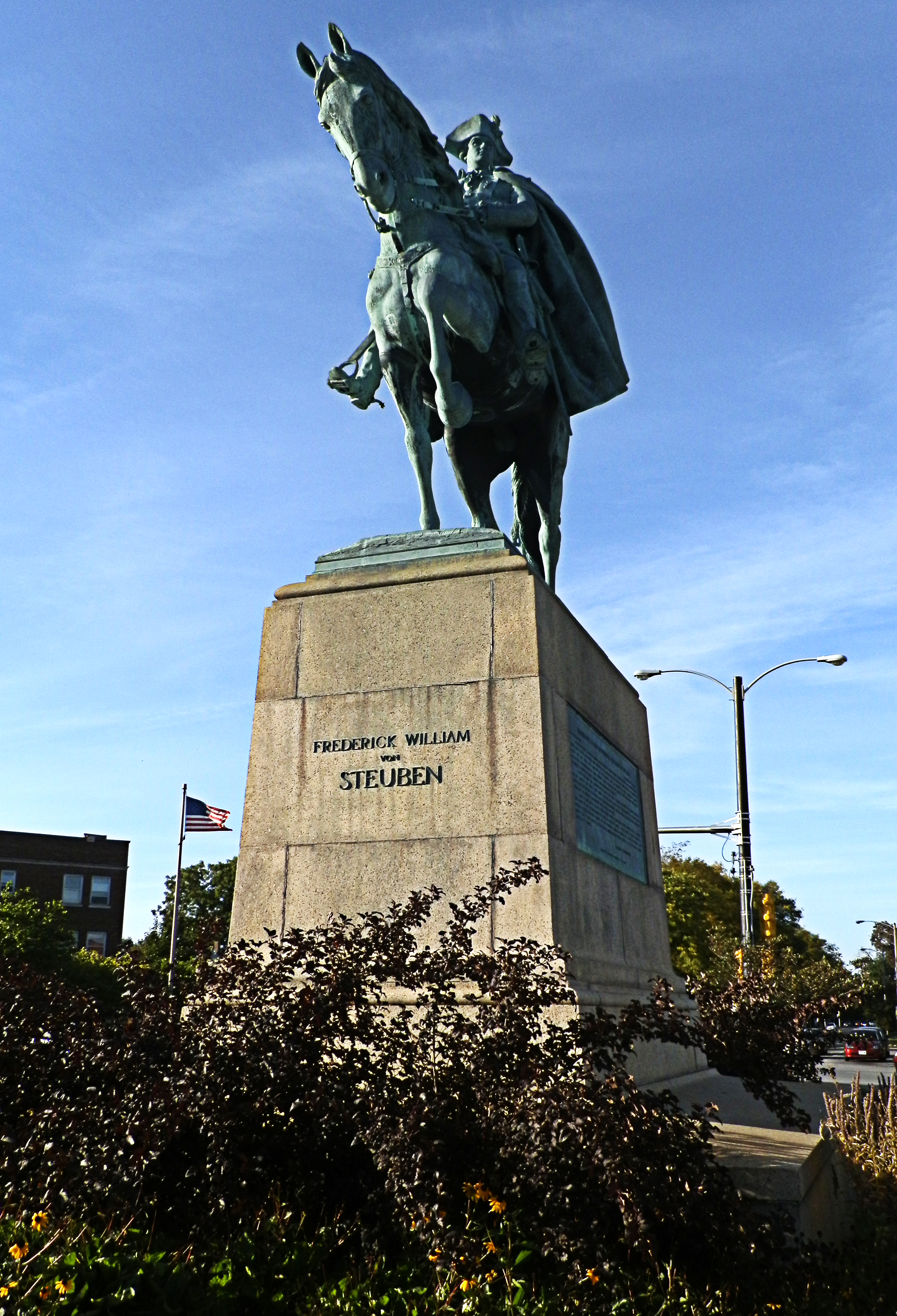
von Steuben

=== Wyoming ===
- Casper
  - Lieutenant Caspar W. Collins, by Pershing Geiger, Casper Events Center, 1981.
- Cody
  - John Jeremiah "Liver-Eating" Johnston, by Peter M. Fillerup, Old Trail Town, ca. 1974.
- Jackson*
  - Cowboy, by Bud Boller, George Washington Memorial Park, 1976.
