= Prospect Park (Brooklyn) =

Public park in Brooklyn, New York

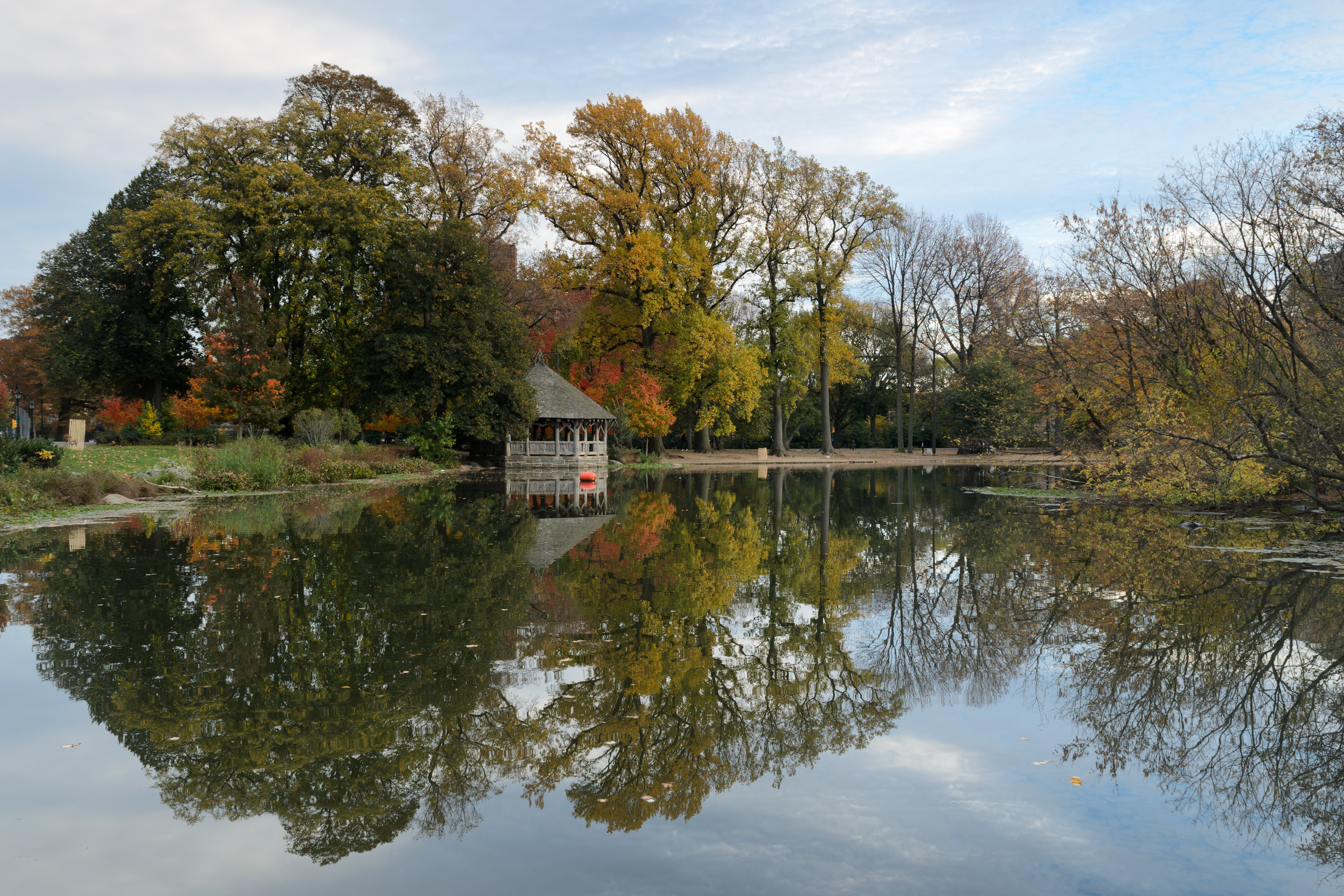
- Interactive map of Prospect Park
- Type: Urban park
- Location: Brooklyn, New York, United States
- Coordinates: 40°39′42″N 73°58′15″W
- Area: 526 acres (2.13 km^{2})
- Created: 1867–1873
- Owner: NYC Parks
- Operator: Prospect Park Alliance
- Visitors: about 8–10 million annually
- Status: Open all year
- Public transit: Subway and bus; see below
- Website: www.prospectpark.org
- Prospect Park
- U.S. National Register of Historic Places
- New York State Register of Historic Places
- New York City Landmark
- Architects: Frederick Law Olmsted and Calvert Vaux (landscape architects)
- NRHP reference No.: 80002637
- NYCL No.: 0901

Significant dates
- Added to NRHP: September 17, 1980
- Designated NYSRHP: June 23, 1980
- Designated NYCL: November 25, 1975

Prospect Park is a 526-acre (2.13 km^{2}) urban park in the New York City borough of Brooklyn. The park is situated between the neighborhoods of Park Slope, Prospect Heights, Crown Heights, Prospect Lefferts Gardens, Flatbush, and Windsor Terrace, and is adjacent to the Brooklyn Museum, Grand Army Plaza, and the Brooklyn Botanic Garden. Prospect Park is the second-largest public park in Brooklyn, behind Marine Park. Designated as a New York City scenic landmark and listed on the National Register of Historic Places, Prospect Park is operated by the Prospect Park Alliance and NYC Parks.

First proposed in legislation passed in 1859, Prospect Park was laid out by landscape architects Frederick Law Olmsted and Calvert Vaux for the then-independent city of Brooklyn. Prospect Park opened in 1867, though it was not substantially complete until 1873. The park subsequently underwent numerous modifications and expansions to its facilities. Several additions to the park were completed in the 1890s, in the City Beautiful architectural movement. In the early 20th century, New York City Department of Parks and Recreation (NYC Parks) commissioner Robert Moses started a program to clean up Prospect Park. A period of decline in the late 20th century spurred the creation of the Prospect Park Alliance, which refurbished many parts of the park from the 1980s through the 2020s.

Main attractions of the park include the 90-acre (36 ha) Long Meadow; the Picnic House; Litchfield Villa; Prospect Park Zoo; the Boathouse; Concert Grove; Brooklyn's only lake, covering 60 acres (24 ha); and the Prospect Park Bandshell that hosts outdoor concerts in the summertime. The park also has sports facilities, including the Prospect Park Tennis Center, basketball courts, baseball fields, soccer fields, and the New York Pétanque Club in the Parade Ground. There is also a private Society of Friends (Quaker) cemetery on Quaker Hill near the ball fields. In addition, Prospect Park is part of the Brooklyn-Queens Greenway, a network of green spaces that stretch across western Long Island.

== History ==
=== Before the park ===
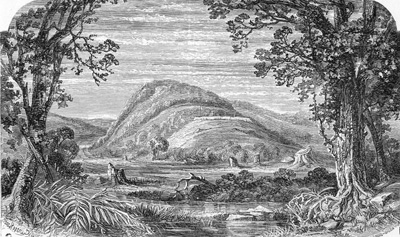
Etching of the Battle Pass area from the 1776 Battle of Brooklyn in the American Revolutionary War (1775–1783). c. 1792

Approximately 17,000 years ago, the terminal moraine of the receding Wisconsin Glacier that formed Long Island, known as the Harbor Hill Moraine, established a string of hills and kettles in the northern part of the park and a lower lying outwash plain in the southern part. Mount Prospect (or Prospect Hill), near the intersection of Flatbush Avenue and Eastern Parkway, is the highest among a string of hills that extends into the park, including Sullivan, Breeze, and Lookout. Rising 200 feet (61 m) above sea level, it is one of the tallest hills in Brooklyn. The area was originally forested, but became open pasture after two centuries of European colonization. Significant stands of trees remained only in the peat bogs centered south of Ninth and Flatbush Avenues, as well as in a large bog north of Ninth Street, and contained chestnut, white poplar, and oak. (Note: The large peat bog north of Ninth Street, running east of Prospect Park West, was called the Pigeon Ground and occupied much of the area that was to become the Long Meadow.) Some of these stands were preserved in the modern-day Prospect Park Ravine and nicknamed "The Last Forest of Brooklyn".

During the American Revolutionary War (1775–1783), the park was a site of the Battle of Long Island (aka Battle of Brooklyn). The Continental Army attempted to hold Battle Pass, an opening in the terminal moraine where the old Flatbush Road passed from the villages of Brooklyn to Flatbush, where a large white oak tree was cut down to block the progress of the British forces. The pass fell after some of the heaviest fighting in the engagement, and its loss contributed to George Washington's decision to retreat. Even though American forces lost the battle, they were able to hold the British back long enough for Washington's army to escape across the East River to Manhattan. Plaques north of the zoo, as well as the Maryland Monument at Lookout Hill's foot, honor this event.

The then-independent city of Brooklyn built Ridgewood Reservoir on Prospect Hill in 1856 to serve its western half. The need to keep the lots around the reservoir free of development, as well as the preservation of the Battle Pass area, were cited as two reasons for establishing a large park nearby.

=== Planning ===
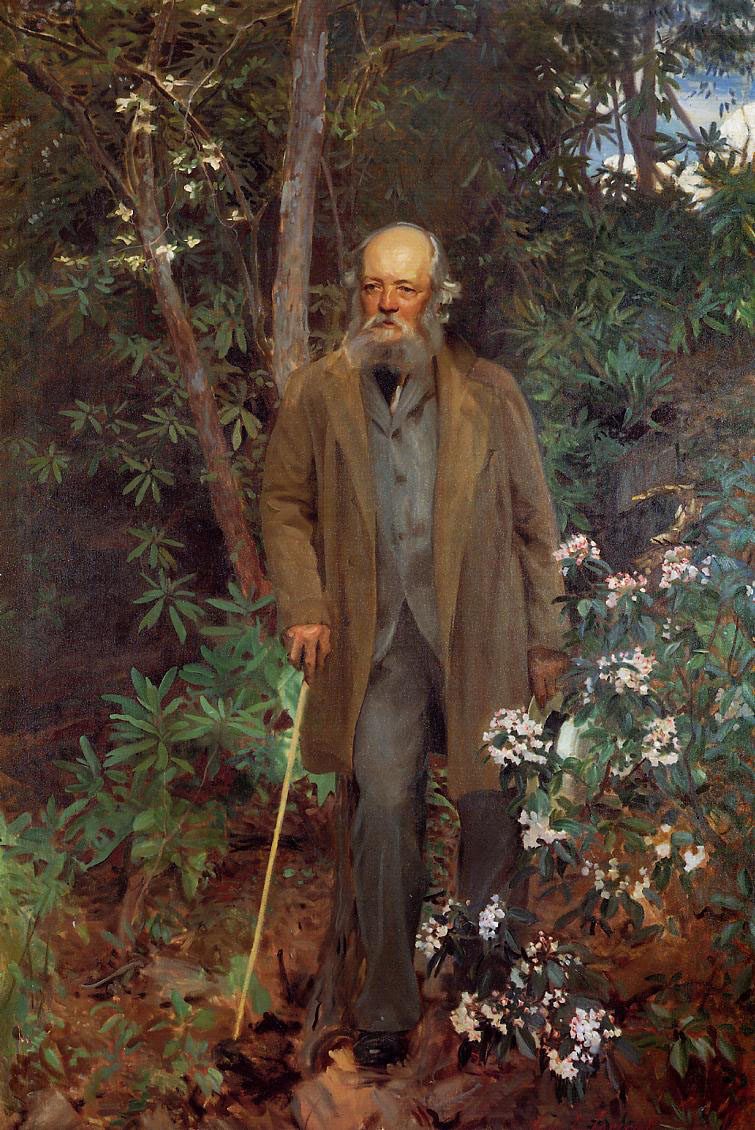
Landscape architect Frederick Law Olmsted, as depicted by John Singer Sargent in 1895

The original impetus to build Prospect Park stemmed from an April 18, 1859, act of the New York State Legislature, empowering a twelve-member commission to recommend sites for parks in the City of Brooklyn. At the time, Brooklyn was promoted as New York City's first commuter suburb, and it became the third largest city in the country from 1860 to 1880, behind New York City (which then included Manhattan and parts of the Bronx) and Philadelphia. During this time, concepts concerning public parks gained popularity. In 1858, landscape architects Frederick Law Olmsted and Calvert Vaux had created the design for Central Park in Manhattan, which became the first landscaped park in the United States. James S. T. Stranahan, then President of the Brooklyn Board of Park Commissioners, believed that a park in Brooklyn "would become a favorite resort for all classes of our community, enabling thousands to enjoy pure air, with healthful exercise, at all seasons of the year..." He also thought a public park would attract wealthy residents. Stranahan originally envisioned one large park extending eastward to the community of Jamaica and what was then Queens County. However, the city's rapid development made this impossible, and today, the largest remnants of this proposed landscape are Prospect Park and the 538-acre (218 ha) Forest Park in Queens.

In February 1860, a group of fifteen commissioners submitted suggestions for locations of four large parks and three small parks in Brooklyn, as well as a series of boulevards to connect them. The largest of these proposed parks was a 320-acre (1.3 km^{2}) plot centered on Mount Prospect and bounded by Warren Street to the north; Vanderbilt, Ninth, and Tenth Avenues to the west; Third and Ninth Streets to the south; and Washington Avenue to the east. Egbert Viele began drawing plans for "Mount Prospect Park", as the space was initially called, and published his proposal in 1861. The park was to straddle Flatbush Avenue and include Prospect Hill, as well as the land now occupied by the Brooklyn Public Library, Brooklyn Botanic Garden, and Brooklyn Museum.

By late 1860, land had been purchased for Viele's plan. However, the onset of the Civil War stopped further activity, and the boulevards and smaller parks were pushed back. The delay prompted some reflection; Stranahan invited Calvert Vaux to review Viele's plans early in 1865. Vaux took issue with Flatbush Avenue's division of the park, thought that the park should have a lake, and urged for southward expansion beyond the city limits and into the then-independent town of Flatbush. Vaux's February 1865 proposal reflected the present layout of the park: three distinctive regions, meadow in the north and west, a wooded ravine in the east, and a lake in the south, without being divided by Flatbush Avenue. Vaux included an oval plaza at the northern end of the park, which would later become Grand Army Plaza. The revised plan called for the purchase of additional parcels to the south and west to accommodate Prospect Lake, but it excluded parcels already purchased east of Flatbush Avenue, including Prospect Hill itself. In addition, engineer-in-charge Joseph P. Davis and assistants John Bogart and John Y. Culyer were named to work on the project.

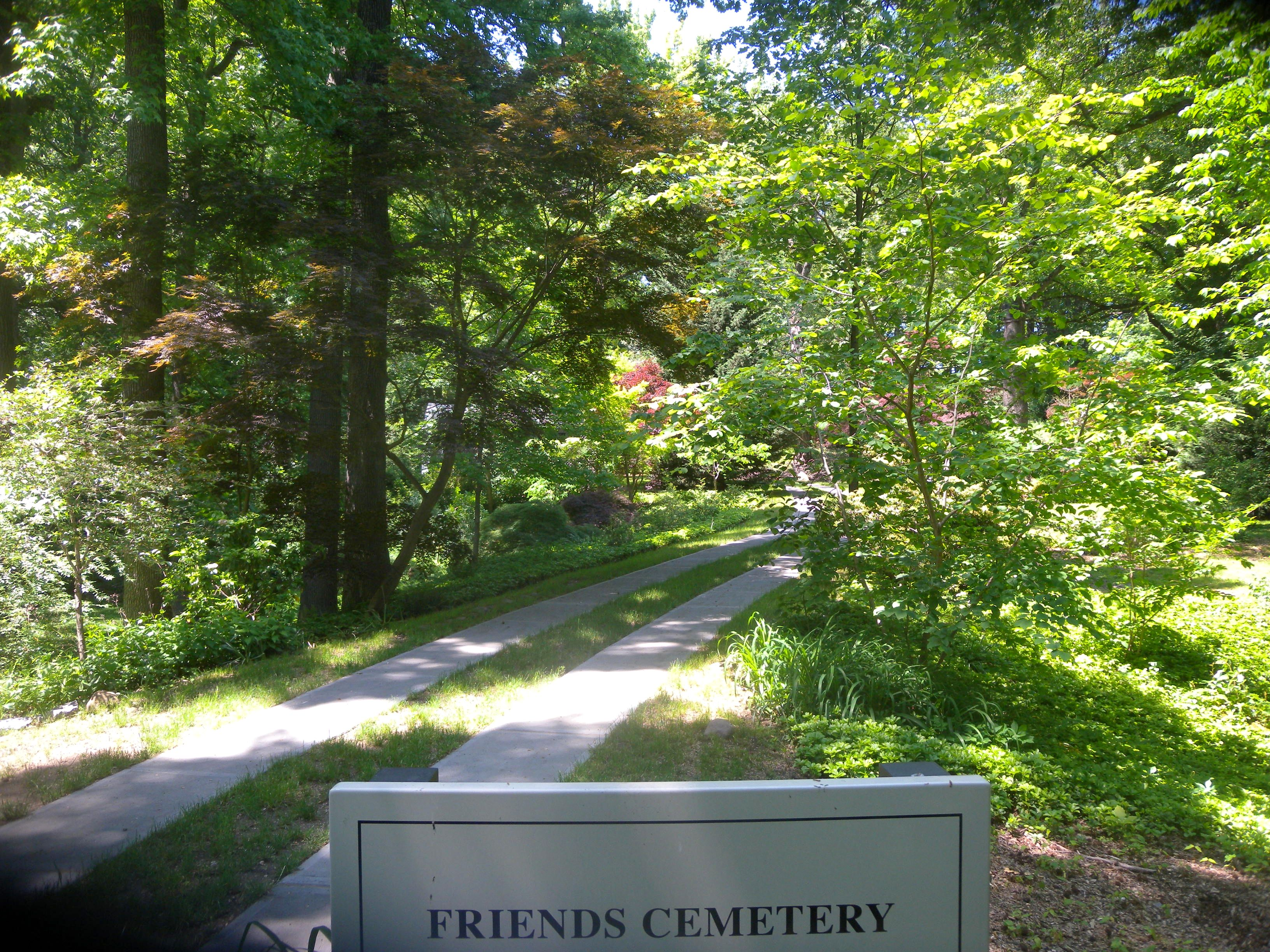
Friends Cemetery

By then, land speculation was underway. The plot bounded by Ninth and Tenth Avenues between Third and Fifteenth Streets was held by real estate developer Edwin Clarke Litchfield, who had erected his home, Litchfield Manor, on the east side of Ninth Avenue in 1857. The Parks Commission ultimately acquired the Litchfield plot in 1868 for $1.7 million, forty-two percent of the overall expenditure for land, even though the plot constituted just over five percent of the park's acreage. Much of this acreage houses the maintenance yards and is rarely seen by the public. In 1866, the New York state legislature passed a bill approving the acquisition of additional land on the southwest side of the park. The park was built around the preexisting Quaker cemetery, which was accommodated by an agreement under which the Society of Friends deeded their unused acreage to the park. In exchange, they retained the remaining 10 acres for their private cemetery in perpetuity, as well as the rights to access the cemetery.

=== Construction ===
Despite the repercussions of Vaux's revisions, Stranahan championed the revised proposal. Vaux recruited Olmsted and formally presented the plan in February 1866. The revised plan was accepted by May. Construction started the following month, and initial work focused on draining the land. Then, the roads, bridle paths, and walks within Prospect Park were graded and individual features were landscaped. Three scenic roads, the West, Center, and East Drives, were built within the perimeters of the park. Depending on the time of year, between 250 and 2,000 workers were employed. Much of the landscaping focused on removing obstructions such as pits and swamps, and enhancing other natural features such as hills. Trees were only removed if they blocked a roadway or path that was being built.

The first section of the park opened to the public on October 19, 1867, while it was still under construction. The segment that was open to the public included part of the East Drive between the north end of the park, at modern-day Grand Army Plaza, and Coney Island Avenue at the southeast corner. The park initially contained the Playground, which had a croquet lawn, a sailboat pond, a maze, and a summer house. By 1868, the open portions of Prospect Park were patronized by 100,000 people per month, and several miles of roads, paths, and walkways had been completed. The land for Prospect Park's Parade Ground was acquired that year. A series of pedestrian arches to separate pedestrian and vehicular traffic in the park were also built during this time.

Over 200 benches were installed to accommodate the new visitors. Rustic wooden shelters with "various oblong and polygonal shapes" were placed along the shore of Prospect Park's lake and were designed to be used as scenic overlooks. Several bridges and eight hundred bird houses were installed to enhance the park's rustic quality. In its 1870 annual report, the Brooklyn park commissioners reported that the lake was nearly completed, and that widening of nearby streets was underway. By 1871, the monthly visitor count had increased to 250,000. The park's patronage continued to increase, and in an 1873 article, The New York Times described Prospect Park as having become an "indispensable Sunday resort for the toiling thousands of Brooklyn." However, the high patronage also had downsides: an 1875 editorial in the Times observed that many people would take shortcuts along the grass rather than travel on designated routes.

Prospect Park was substantially complete in 1873, but with the financial panic of that year, Olmsted and Vaux stopped collaborating on the park's construction. Some of the originally envisioned facets of the park, such as an observation tower, a terraced restaurant, and a top-shaped Carriage Concourse, were not built. Olmsted and Vaux had also planned for a system of parkways to connect to Prospect Park, though only two were built: Ocean Parkway, running to Coney Island in the south, and Eastern Parkway, running to Crown Heights, Brooklyn in the east. Overall, the city of Brooklyn spent more than $4 million to acquire the parkland, while the actual cost of construction amounted to more than $5 million.

Stranahan was regarded by his 19th-century peers as the true "Father of Prospect Park", a reputation established through his 22-year reign as Park Commission president (1860–1882), engagement of Olmsted and Vaux, overseeing complex land acquisitions, securing funding to build the park, and after the park's completion, defending the park against changes that were not compatible with the overall design. A statue of James S. T. Stranahan was proposed in 1890. Located inside the Grand Army Plaza entrance, the statue was sculpted by Frederick MacMonnies and presented to Stranahan in June 1891.

=== Late 19th century ===
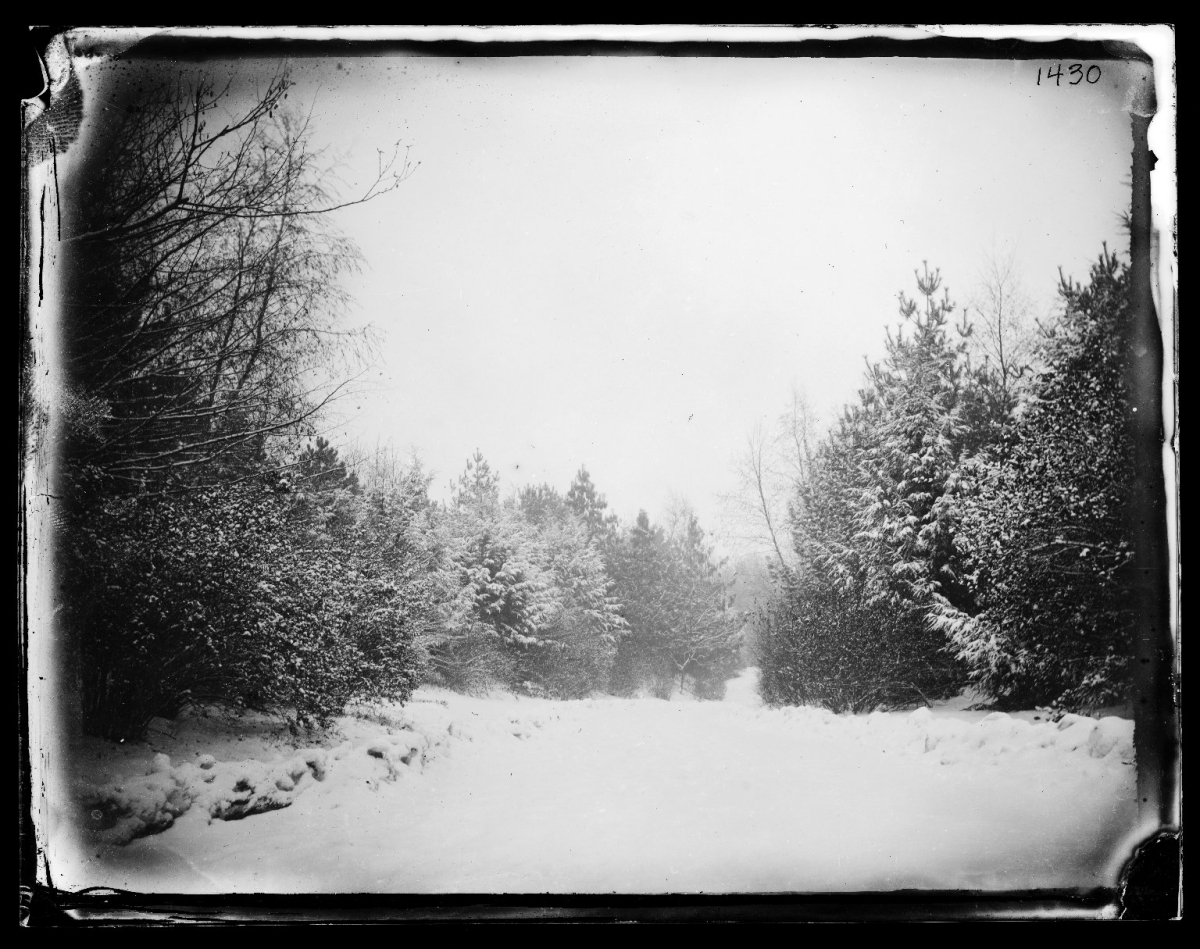
Prospect Park in 1880

Prospect Park became widely used after its opening, and many sports were hosted there. By the late 19th century, archery was among the most popular sports being practiced on the Long Meadow, and up to 100 groups would convene on the Long Meadow to play croquet on weekend afternoons. During winters, people practiced "ice baseball" on the lake. Ice skating was also a common sport, and was frequently practiced on the lake during the winter. Because picnicking was banned in Central Park, and generally disapproved-of in many other parks in Manhattan, Prospect Park became a popular picnic spot. However, this also resulted in litter, and by 1881, The New York Times was receiving complaints about a lack of cleanliness in the park.

No new structures were constructed in Prospect Park until 1882, when a utilitarian brick stable was constructed on the park's western side. The same year, Brooklyn mayor Seth Low did not reappoint Stranahan or the other commissioners, a change that neither Stranahan nor the other commissioners actively opposed. Stranahan, for his part, was becoming more engaged in other Brooklyn concerns. The action, however, did signal a change in the style of park management, which grew to embrace neoclassicism.

Simultaneously during the 1880s, the quality of Prospect Park had declined through overuse and a corresponding lack of maintenance. After Brooklyn Mayor Alfred C. Chapin walked through the park in 1888, he requested that $100,000 be allocated for improvements. Subsequently, the Brooklyn Parks Commission embarked on a $200,000 program to restore the park. It repaved many of the walkways and drives, as well as replanted flora. Ornate gateways were added to the Ocean Parkway and Willink Plaza entrances. The commission also proposed purchasing the land around the Mount Prospect Reservoir, northeast of modern-day Prospect Park, which had been excluded from the final plan for the park. Instead, this space was developed as the Brooklyn Museum in the 1890s, followed by the Brooklyn Central Library and Brooklyn Botanic Garden in the early 20th century. The reservoir was filled in, and along with Mount Prospect Hill, became the separate Mount Prospect Park in 1940.

The park and its surroundings were subsequently restored in the 1890s during the City Beautiful movement. After the Soldier's and Sailor's Arch at Grand Army Plaza was built in 1892, the park commissioners engaged the McKim, Mead, and White architectural firm to redesign Grand Army Plaza in a complementary, neoclassical way. By 1896, Grand Army Plaza sported four towering granite columns adorned with carved fasces and eagles at the base, though the bronze eagles atop the columns would not be installed until 1902. Granite fencing with decorative bronze urns replaced simple wooden fencing, and polygonal granite pavilions on the east and west corners of the park supplanted earlier rustic shelters. All the major entrances of the park gained similar neoclassical treatments. By the turn of the twentieth century, sculptures by Frederick MacMonnies graced the Arch and works by MacMonnies and Alexander Proctor adorned many of the entrances.

Neoclassical structures appeared elsewhere within the park. McKim, Mead and White designed the Ocean Parkway and Willink entrances, which opened in 1890. The same firm transformed the Children's Playground and Pools in the park's northeast quadrant into the Rose Garden and the Vale of Cashmere, each a formally arranged space, in 1893–1894. Stanford White's Maryland Monument was installed near the Terrace Bridge in 1895 in recognition of the Maryland 400, who fought in the Battle of Long Island on the slopes of Lookout Hill.

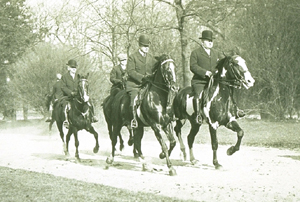
Horse riders on the Bridle Path in Prospect Park, 1912, Charles D. Lay

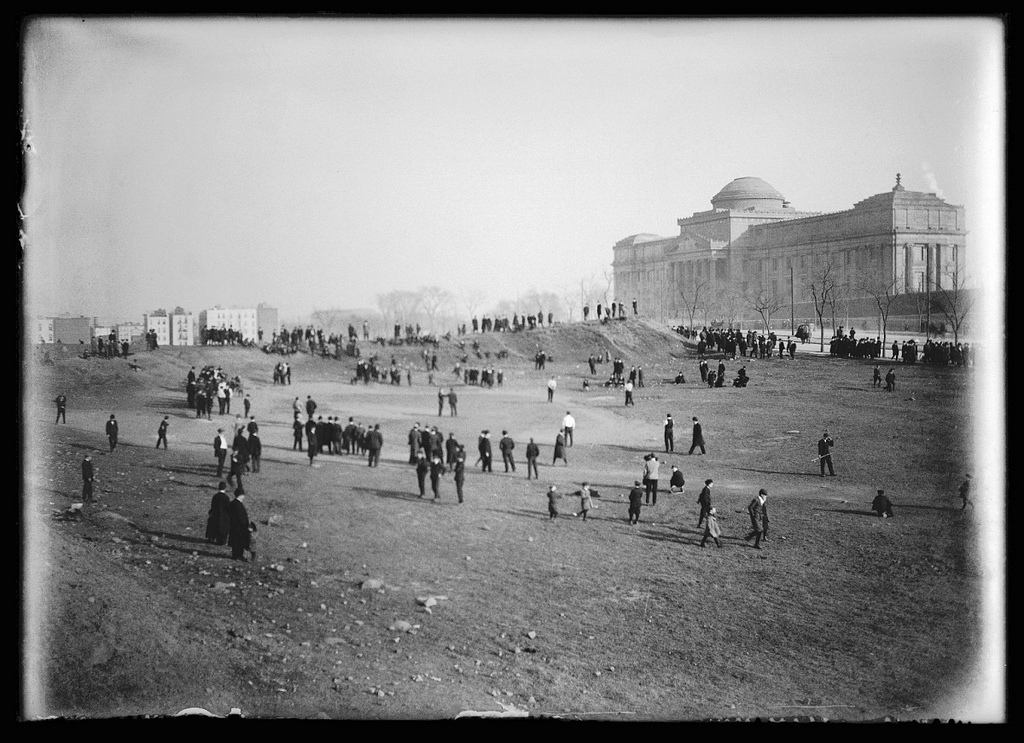
Brooklyn Museum, Prospect Park, c. 1903–1910. Eugene Wemlinger

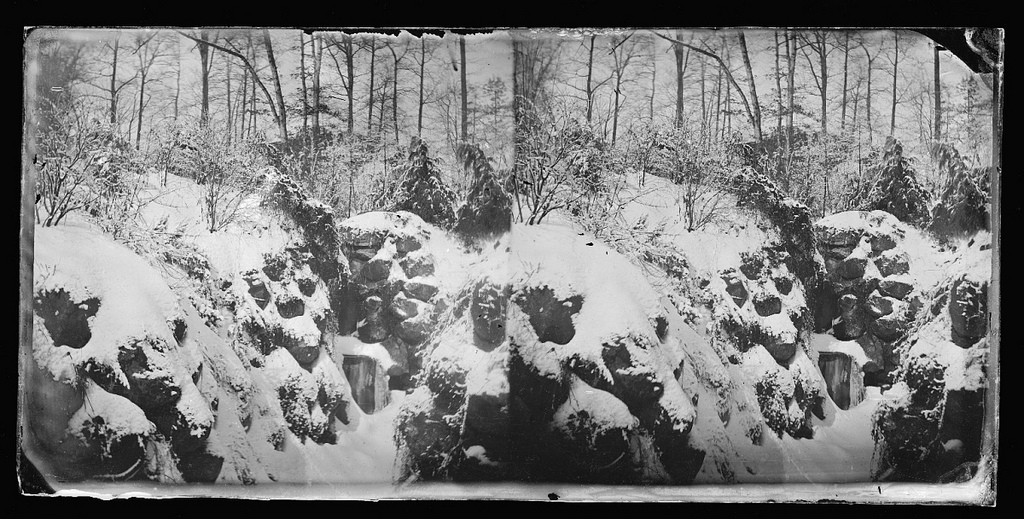
Snow Scene, Prospect Park, c. 1872–1887. George Bradford Brainerd

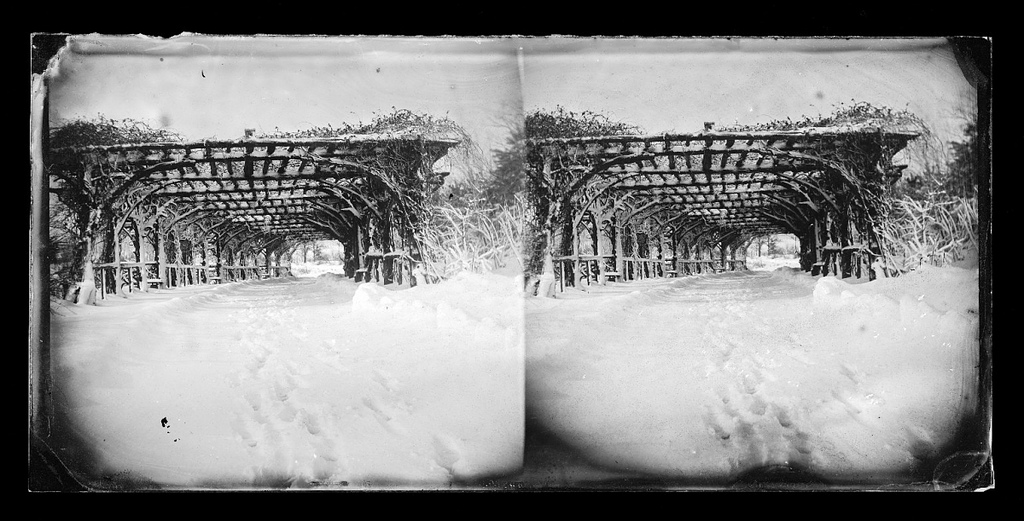
Rose Arbor in Winter, Prospect Park, Brooklyn, c. 1872–1887. George Bradford Brainerd

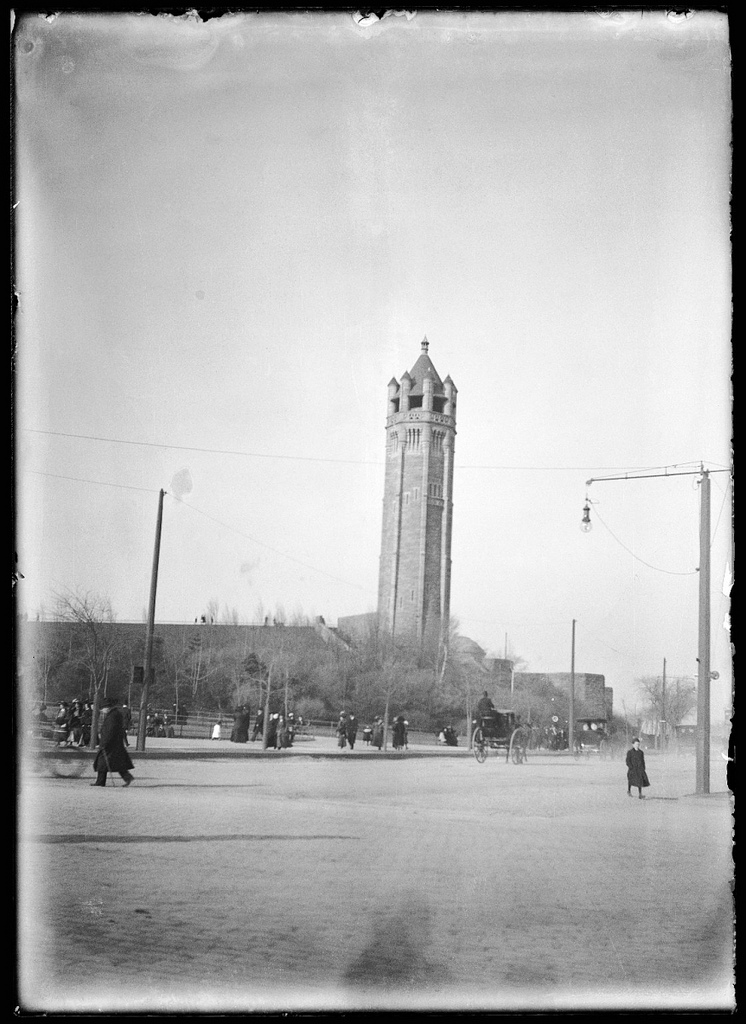
Water Tower, Prospect Park, c. 1903–1910. Eugene Wemlinger

=== Early 20th century ===
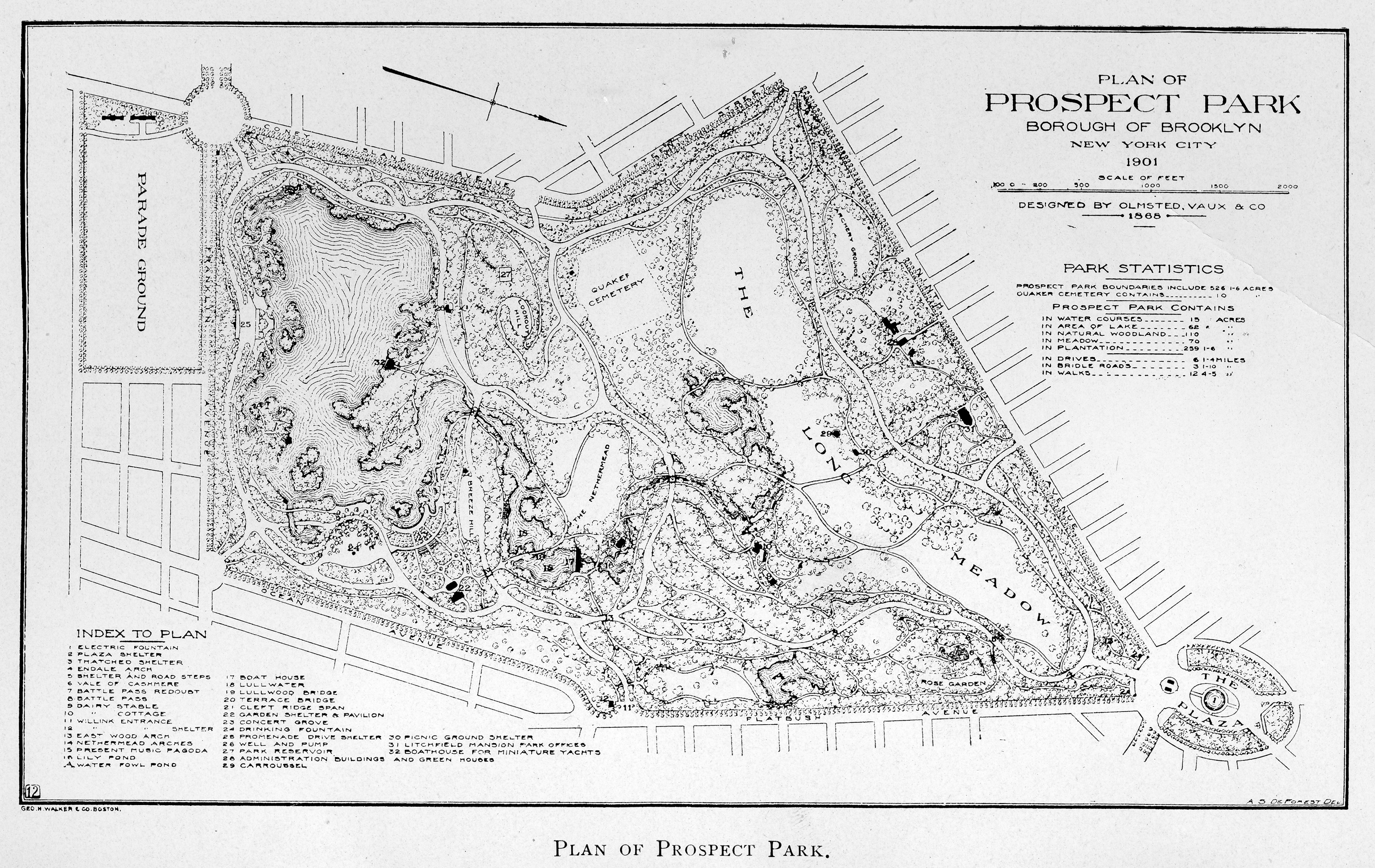
1901 map of Prospect Park, published in the Parks Department's 1902 Annual Report

The city of Brooklyn merged with Manhattan and other outlying boroughs in 1898, creating the City of Greater New York. By the end of the century, Prospect Park saw about 15 million visitors per year. Though people were officially banned from hosting picnics and other large eating events in Prospect Park, the rule was not enforced for several years until 1903, when a surge of visitors from Manhattan led to an increase in luncheons being hosted. In 1907, lights were installed to deter couples from kissing or other intimate activity within the park. At the same time, the city embarked on an improvement program at Prospect Park by cleaning out the landscape, constructing the Bartel-Pritchard Square entrance, and removing an old boathouse that had been supplanted by the Boathouse on the Lullwater.

The construction of structures continued in the first decade of the 20th century. The neoclassical Peristyle (1904), Boathouse (1905), Tennis House (1910), and Willink Comfort Station (1912) were all designed by Helmle, Hudswell and Huberty, alumni and proteges of McKim, Mead, and White. The entrances into Prospect Park that were constructed during this time were also in the neoclassical style. Two now-demolished structures were also constructed on the peninsula, the Model Yacht Club House (1900–1956) and a shelter (1915 – c. 1940s). Olmsted was said to have been "distressed" by these modifications to the park's original plan.

From World War I to the mayoral administration of Fiorello La Guardia in the 1930s, investment in park infrastructure declined. A two-story brick building was opened in the Menagerie in 1916, housing monkeys, some small mammals, and several birds. After the end of World War I, a memorial commemorating fallen soldiers was proposed; it was dedicated in 1921. The only other structures to be built during this period were the Picnic House (1927) and a small comfort station at the Ocean Avenue entrance (1930), both designed by J. Sarsfield Kennedy. A golf course was proposed for the Long Meadow in the 1920s, but eventually, it was built on the Peninsula, abutting the Lake at the park's southern end. In 1932, a faux Mount Vernon was built in Prospect Park to commemorate the bicentennial of George Washington's birthday. However, Prospect Park was in stasis for the most part, and like many of the city's parks, it was run year-after-year with declining budgets. The New York Times observed that by the 1930s, "generations of Parks Department officials had lived well and got rich by diverting maintenance funds, and the park showed the result of a half century of abuse and neglect."

=== Robert Moses era ===
In January 1934, newly elected Mayor Fiorello La Guardia appointed Robert Moses as the commissioner of the New York City Department of Parks (NYC Parks), a new organization that eliminated borough park commissioners. Moses would remain commissioner for the next twenty-six years, leaving significant impacts on the city's parks. Moses used federal monies made available to relieve Depression-era unemployment, and this resulted in a boom in construction at Prospect Park. The Prospect Park Zoo opened in 1935 on the east side of the park, replacing the former Menagerie. The Bandshell and five playgrounds were also constructed toward the end of the 1930s. In addition, the Carousel was opened in 1949 as a gift from the foundation of the late philanthropist Michael Friedsam. Moses also enacted new policies at the park, including a ban on sheep grazing at the Long Meadow.

During World War II, Prospect Park hosted a portion of the city's antiaircraft defense. Three hundred soldiers manned batteries, underground ammunition dumps, observation towers, repair shops and barracks around Swan Lake in the Long Meadow. Though the defenses were disbanded in 1944, traces of slit trenches and sandbagged gun emplacements could still be found several years afterward. In 1959, the southern third of the Long Meadow was graded and fenced off for ballfields.

The Boathouse on the Lullwater, almost demolished in 1964

Plans for the Kate Wollman Memorial Rink were approved in 1960, and the rink opened in December 1961. The rink was built on a filled-in portion of Prospect Lake, necessitating the removal of Music Island and the panoramic view of the lake created by Olmsted and Vaux. To make the park more visually appealing, NYC Parks also began to clear the area of weeds and invasive species, though this had the unintended effect of hastening erosion.

It was not unusual in the Moses years, and especially the decade after his departure, to quietly remove underutilized or redundant structures. To do so was regarded as economical and prudent management. Several structures had been destroyed by the time Moses left his position as NYC Parks commissioner in May 1960. These included the Dairy, destroyed 1935; Concert Grove House, demolished 1949; Music Island, razed 1960; the Flower Garden; the Thatched Shelter, destroyed in the 1940s; the Model Yacht Club, burned down in 1956; and the Greenhouse Conservatories, taken apart in 1955.

=== Late 20th century ===
==== 1960s and 1970s ====
The demolition of Pennsylvania Station in Manhattan during 1963–1968 spawned a nascent historic preservation movement. In September 1964, the Parks Department was within forty-eight hours of demolishing the Boathouse on the Lullwater. At the time the structure was underutilized; the boat concession only operated on weekends and its peak traffic was fewer than ten people per hour. However, the Boathouse shared many architectural design features with the famous station. A preservation group, The Friends of Prospect Park, including in its membership, poet and longtime Brooklyn resident Marianne Moore, built public awareness over disappearing historical structures and threatened flora within the park. Public pressure induced Park Commissioner Newbold Morris to rescind the decision to demolish the Boathouse in December 1964.

Projects to restore Prospect Park were taken up by the late 1960s. In 1965, the city allocated $450,000 to renovate the Vale of Cashmere and the Rose Garden ahead of Brooklyn's 300th anniversary, and the park's 100th anniversary, the following year. Another $225,000 was allocated to renovate the boathouse, and $249,000 was allotted to overall renovations. The city renovated part of the Long Meadow on the northwest side of the park, as well as the children's farm. However, some of the contracts were delayed, including renovations to the Boathouse and the tennis courts, as well as a reconstruction of the Music Pagoda, which had burned down in 1968. By 1971, the city had spent $4 million to renovate Prospect Park, including renovating the Boathouse and dredging the lake. The Rose Garden and the Vale of Cashmere had also been re-landscaped. Also part of the renovation was a restoration of the Prospect Park Carousel from 1971 to 1974, and the exterior of the Boathouse was restored in 1979.

By the 1970s, Prospect Park was beset by crime; a 1974 report found that 44 percent of city residents would warn people to stay away from the park under any circumstances. Much of Prospect Park suffered soil erosion and lack of maintenance caused the landscape to deteriorate. By 1979, park attendance dropped to two million, the lowest recorded level in the history of the park.

==== 1980s and 1990s ====
The mayoral administration of Ed Koch formed plans in 1980 to turn over the administration of the troubled Prospect Park Zoo to the Wildlife Conservation Society. Over the next seven years, the city invested $17 million in cleaning up the park, including $10 million in federal funds from a Community Development Block Grant. Annual visitor numbers had nearly tripled to 5 million between 1980 and 1987. During this period, Prospect Park also received two historic designations: it was made a New York City scenic landmark on November 25, 1975, and was listed on the National Register of Historic Places on September 17, 1980.

The Prospect Park Alliance, a non-profit organization, was created in April 1987 based on the model of the Central Park Conservancy, which had helped restore Central Park in the 1980s. Shortly afterward, NYC Parks began entering into restoration projects with the organization. The Alliance's first major project was the $550,000 restoration of the Carousel in 1987–1989. The carousel had not operated since 1983, and its original horse-shaped seats were removed during the restoration. Nine years later, in 1996, it started a $4.5 million restoration of the Ravine. The Boathouse was also restored again in the late 1990s due to deterioration of the exterior terracotta. The National Audubon Society signed a lease for the Boathouse in 2000, and the building became the site of the nation's first urban Audubon society. The restoration of the Harmony Playground and Bandshell was completed the same year. However, other parts of Prospect Park remained neglected, such as the eastern side of the park, where the surrounding community was generally poorer than the western side.

=== Early 21st century ===
==== 2000s and 2010s ====
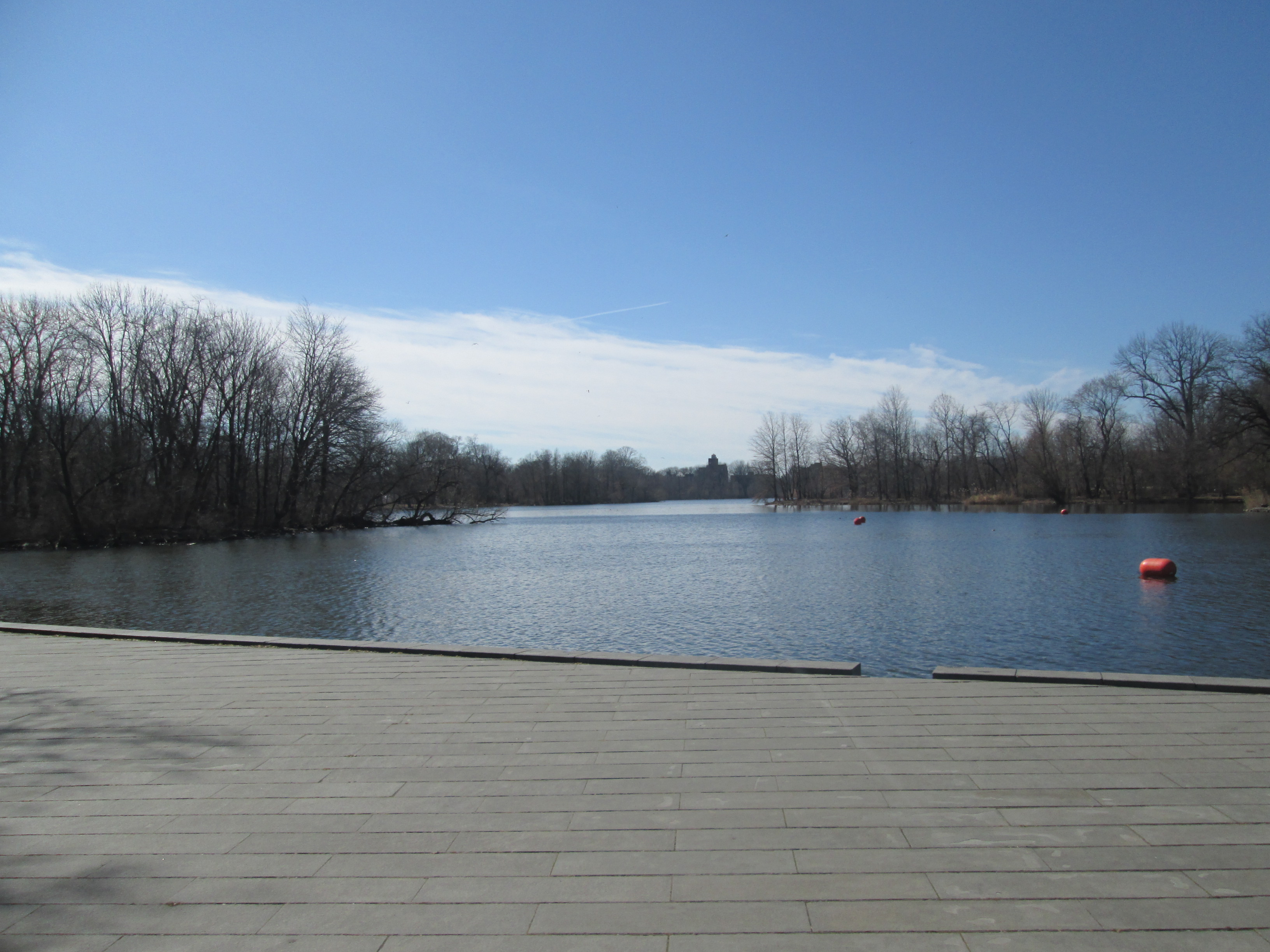
A promenade facing the lake, built in the first decade of the 21st century

By 2000, the Wollman Rink was deteriorating, and there was a need to replace it. The Alliance soon formed plans to restore Music Island and the original shoreline, both obliterated by the construction of the original rink in 1960. Several Moses-era playgrounds and the Bandshell were retained because their venues were popular. Original rustic summer houses were restored or recreated on the shores of Prospect Park Lake, along the Lullwater and in the Ravine. As part of the restoration plans, the Wollman Rink was to be replaced by two rinks in the new LeFrak Center, a year-round recreational facility. Work on the LeFrak Center began in 2009, and the Wollman Rink had been demolished by 2011. The Samuel J. and Ethel LeFrak Center at Lakeside was completed in December 2013 at a cost of $74 million. As part of the Wollman Rink's replacement, plans for the restored Music Island were announced in 2009. The Chaim Baier Music Island, and the Shelby White and Leon Levy Esplanade overlooking the island, were restored using a $10 million grant, and were officially rededicated in October 2012.

The Prospect Park Alliance subsequently completed or proposed more restoration projects for the park. Long Meadow ball field 1 was rebuilt between 2013 and 2014. The following year, the Alliance announced some projects on Prospect Park's eastern side, including the $200,000 restoration of Battle Pass. The Alliance also intended to restore the water-damaged Oriental Pavilion for $2 million and replace fencing on Flatbush Avenue for $2.4 million. In 2016, the Alliance also received $3.2 million from NYC Parks' Parks Without Borders program to construct two new entrances on Flatbush Avenue, the park's first new entrances in over 70 years, as well as rebuild the Willink entrance. During the city's 2016 fiscal year, which ended June 30, 2016, politicians also contributed funds toward various restoration projects in the park. These included $2.5 million for renovating Lefferts Historic House, $2 million to rebuild pathways, $1.75 million for replacing fencing on Ocean Avenue, $750,000 for renovating the ballfields on Long Meadow, and $500,000 for the Carousel's restoration. In addition, $100,000 was earmarked for the installation of an experimental running surface on Park Drive, and through a participatory budgeting program, residents of the surrounding communities allocated funds for other projects such as new drinking fountains, a dog run, community barbecue sites, and an aquatic weed harvester. Also in 2016, as part of a project to repair damage caused by Hurricane Sandy in 2012, the Prospect Park Alliance used goats to clean up the shrubbery in woodlands around the Vale of Cashmere, then re-landscaped the sites at a cost of $727,000.

The Well House, located on the Lake, reopened in 2017 as a composting restroom, and the Dog Beach along the watercourse's Upper Pool was renovated. The same year, the Alliance received funds to renovate the Parade Ground, the Tennis House, and ball fields. The Alliance also announced an upcoming renovation of the Rose Garden. Ball fields 6 and 7 were renovated and reopened in 2017, while ball fields 4 and 5 reopened in late 2020. Construction started on the Flatbush Avenue fence repairs in 2018, and the new entrances were slated to start construction in early 2019. Construction of a dog run in the Parade Ground also started in August 2019, and the dog run opened in July 2020. In addition, Amanda Williams and Olalekan Jeyifous were selected in 2019 to design Our Destiny, Our Democracy, a monument near the Ocean and Parkside Avenue entrance.

==== 2020s ====
The Concert Grove Pavilion reopened in April 2021 after a one-year renovation. That December, a $40 million renovation of the Vale of Cashmere was announced. The last two ball fields on Long Meadow reopened in early 2023 after several years of renovations. During mid-2023, the New York City government considered erecting tents in Prospect Park to temporarily house asylum seekers. The Prospect Park Alliance reopened Fallkill Falls to the public in October 2023; prior to Fallkill Falls' reopening, trespassers regularly accessed it. The organization announced in January 2024 that an abandoned comfort station at the Ocean and Parkside Avenue entrance would be converted into a welcome center named for Shirley Chisholm, which was expected to open in two years. A cafe opened in the Prospect Park Boathouse that July.

During the November 2024 wildfire outbreak in the northeast U.S., a fire broke out in the Ravine, damaging 2 acres (0.81 ha) of woodland. The Prospect Park Alliance estimated that it would cost $200,000 to restore the burned forest. The LeFrak Center at Lakeside reopened in 2025 following a renovation, and Ekstein Development Group and Oberon Restaurant Group were hired to manage the LeFrak Center. The Prospect Park Alliance opened five nature trails in the park that August and announced plans in October to plant 3,000 trees in the Ravine. As part of the city's Bluebelt program, city officials allocated $68 million for landscape modifications that December, including the addition of a rain garden and two ponds to reduce flooding during storms. In March 2025, the city began renovating the Vale for $37.5 million and adding a bike lane on the park's eastern perimeter, and constructing a pedestrian plaza at the Ocean and Parkside Avenues entrance.

== Geography ==
Map of notable buildings and structures at Prospect Park (note: not all entrances shown). Click on points for more details.

Prospect Park occupies 526 acres (213 ha) in central Brooklyn. It is bound by Prospect Park West and the neighborhood of Park Slope to the northwest; Prospect Park Southwest and the Windsor Terrace neighborhood to the southwest and west; Parkside Avenue, Ocean Avenue, Flatbush Avenue, and the neighborhood of Flatbush to the south and southeast; and Grand Army Plaza and the neighborhood of Prospect Heights to the north.

=== Design ===
Frederick Law Olmsted and Calvert Vaux engineered Prospect Park to recreate in real space the pastoral, picturesque, and aesthetic ideals expressed in contemporary paintings. The overall design was inspired partially by Birkenhead Park in the United Kingdom. Prospect Park had recent precedents in the pastoral style, notably Mount Auburn Cemetery near Boston and Green-Wood Cemetery a few blocks away. Olmsted and Vaux felt they had greater success in Brooklyn because of the lack of obstacles there, but they were also assisted in part by park commissioner James Stranahan's patronage and support of their plan.

The two designers wanted visitors to be able to traverse Prospect Park with a myriad of perspectives so that the features could be enjoyed in any order. Olmsted was more involved with the general design of Prospect Park, while Vaux was more involved with specific details. They created the large Long Meadow out of hilly upland pasture interspersed with peat bogs. They also moved and planted trees, hauled topsoil and created a vast unfolding turf with trees placed both separately and in groups. The designers wanted Lookout Hill to be a place of broad views out over Prospect Lake, the farmland beyond, and the bay and ocean in the distance. To create an illusion of an expansive space, Olmsted and Vaux designed the paths in Prospect Park to be meandering.

=== Layout ===
In Olmsted and Vaux's final plan for the park, it was divided into three distinct zones: an open section, a wooded section, and a waterside section. The Parade Ground at the far southwestern corner was excluded from the system of zones.

The first zone consisted of the Long Meadow, a wide open space along the west side of the park. It contains two entrances through tunnels: Meadowport Arch and Endale Arch. The Third Street Playground, Harmony Playground, bandshell, and the picnic and tennis houses are also located here. West Drive traverses this section of Prospect Park.

The second zone is the wooded area in the middle of the park and contains the headwaters of the park's watercourse. In this zone, on the northeast side of the park, there are several points of interest: the Ravine, the Vale of Cashmere, the Rose Garden, the Zucker Natural Exploration Area, and the Prospect Park Zoo. The area contains the Nethermead Arch, an elaborate triple-span bridge. Quaker Hill and the Friends Cemetery are located near the southwest boundary of Prospect Park. Lookout Hill, as well as a large open space called the Nethermead, are located to the south and east of Quaker Hill, respectively. The Ravine also contains the Midwood, an old-growth forest incorporated into Prospect Park during its construction.

The third zone is along the park's south side and consists of Prospect Lake, as well as a peninsula jutting eastward from the lake's northern shore. It is the outlet for the Lullwater, a meandering stream. The Lullwater contains the classical-style Boathouse, a city- and federally-designated landmark, on the Lullwater's eastern shore. To the south, along the lake's eastern shore, are the White Levy Esplanade, as well as the LeFrak Center at Lakeside, a multipurpose recreation center. The LeFrak Center at Lakeside consists of a pair of one-story structures, which share a planted roof. The rink's ceiling contains abstract light-colored streaks on a blue background, which are intended to represent skaters' movements. Also part of the LeFrak Center is a building with a cafe, offices, and event space.

Parkside Avenue, a roughly west–east street, divides the southwestern part of Prospect Park from the rest of the park. This detached sliver of parkland is bounded by Parkside Avenue to the north, Coney Island Avenue to the west, Caton Avenue to the south, and Parade Place to the east. It contains the Parade Ground, which has fifteen numbered courts and fields for various sports.

== Landscape features ==
=== Watercourse ===
The Lake

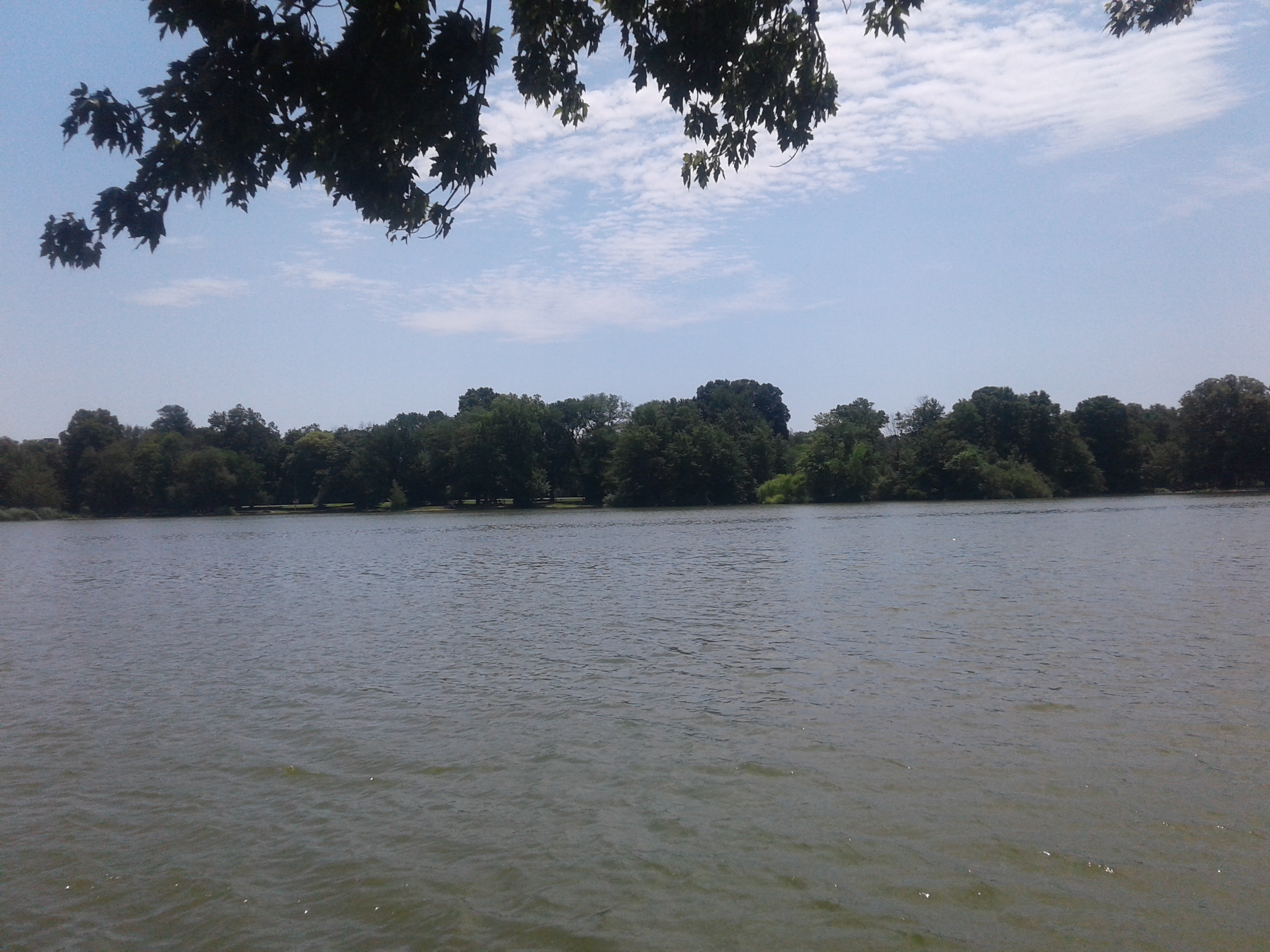
Summer

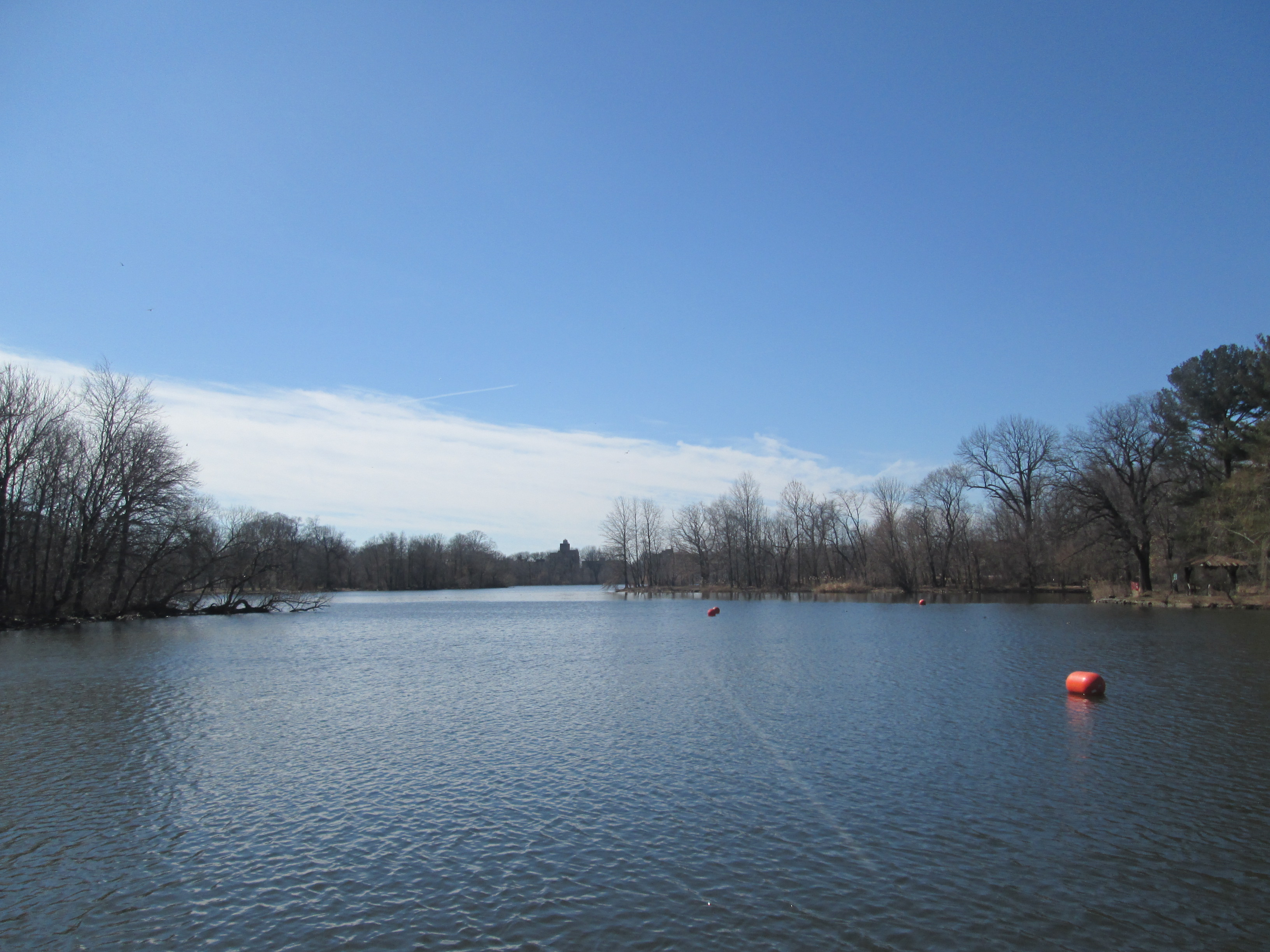
Winter

All of the waterways in Prospect Park are part of a single man-made watercourse. A winding naturalistic stream channel with several ponds feeds a 60-acre (24 ha) lake at the south end of the park. In designing the watercourse, Olmsted and Vaux also took advantage of the preexisting glacier-formed kettle ponds and lowland outwash plains to create a drainage basin centered around the waterway. They crafted the watercourse to include a steep, forested Ravine with significant river edge flora and fauna habitats. As a result, the watercourse is able to accommodate significant bird and fish populations.

Much of the watercourse is lined with vegetation that is designed to absorb precipitation and additional water flow. Olmsted also included an expansive drainage system, which is still in use and extends under the Long Meadow, Ravine, and Nethermead. About two-thirds of Prospect Park Lake's water typically evaporates. However, to prevent flooding after heavy precipitation, Prospect Park employees can control the outflow of water from the lake using a valve.

By the mid-20th century, these artificial waterways and the steep slopes around them had lost their original design character. In 1994, the Prospect Park Alliance launched a 25-year $43-million restoration project for the watercourse.

==== Smaller waterways ====
The water in Prospect Park originates at the top of Fallkill Falls in the center of the park, just north of Quaker Hill and east of Long Meadow. The Well House on the north side of the Lake originally provided the water for the watercourse, and was connected to an underground aquifer. The Well House became outdated when Prospect Park was connected to the New York City water supply system in the early 20th century. By the 21st century, Fallkill Falls was fed by a pipe from the city's water system.

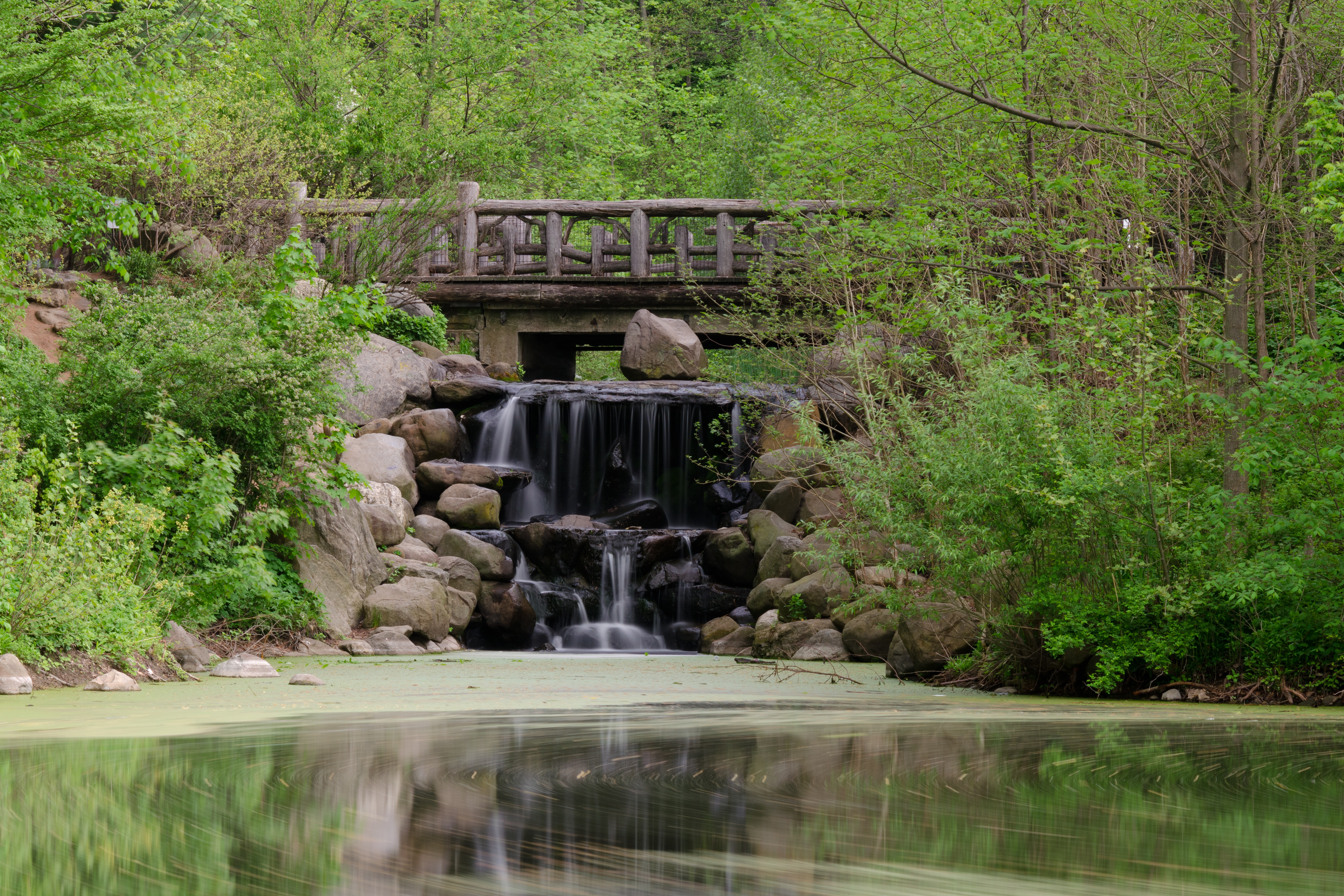
Binnen waterfall

The water from Fallkill Falls runs into Fallkill Pool, past the Fallkill Bridge, through the Upper Pool and Lower Pool, where migratory birds rest and marsh and other water plants can be found. The Upper Pool abuts a dog beach, while the Long Meadow is adjacent to the Lower Pool. The water then passes under the Esdale Bridge, a footbridge over Ambergill Pond. The pond, and the Ambergill Falls just past it, was named by Olmsted and refers to the Old Norse word for "creek". After passing through Ambergill Falls, the water flows under Rock Arch Bridge and past the Ravine, entering the Binnenwater, which is named after a Dutch word for "within". The waters then cascade beneath the Binnen Bridge to the Lullwater, a small pond that contains the Boathouse on its eastern bank. The water then flows under the Lullwater and Terrace bridges to the Peninsula, which is managed both as bird sanctuary and recreational field.

==== Lake ====
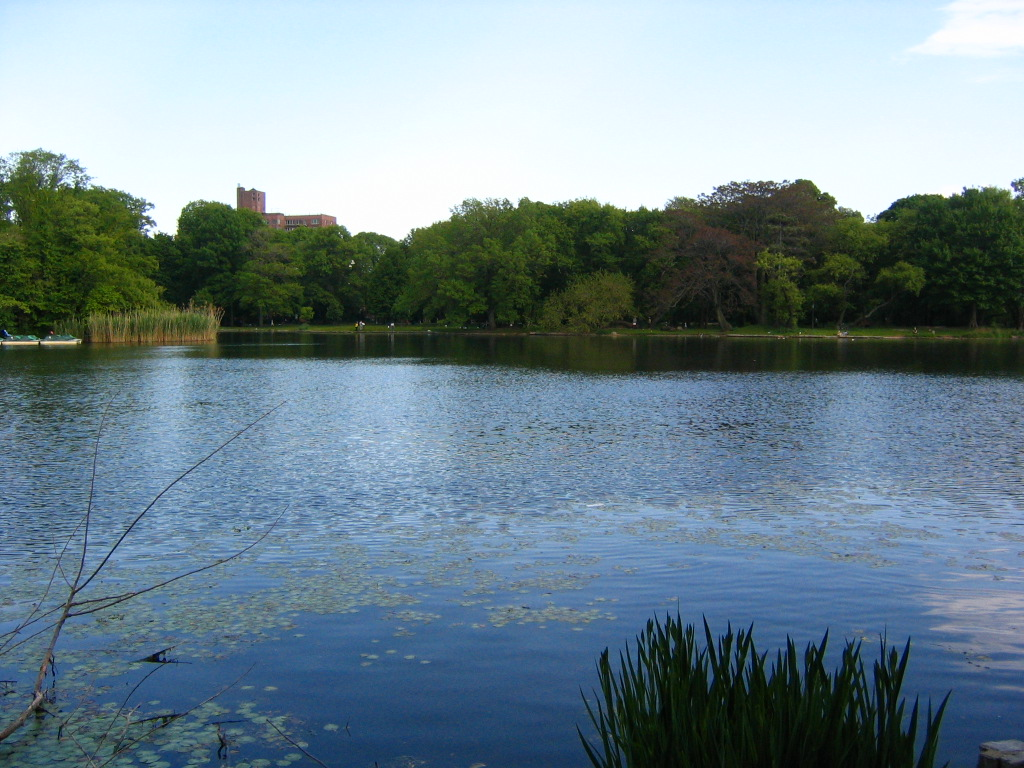
Prospect Park's lake

The mouth of Prospect Park's watercourse is the artificial, 60-acre Prospect Lake (also known as Prospect Park Lake). Prospect Lake includes several islands and is home to over 20 species of fish. Every year, the lake hosts the R.H. Macy's Fishing Contest, a tradition that dates to 1947. Though NYC Parks generally allows licensed anglers to fish, it maintains a catch and release policy to prevent depletion of the fish population. In addition, visitors may explore the lake in kayaks and pedal boats, available at the LeFrak Center at Lakeside, or the Independence, a replica of the original electric launch which took day-trippers around the lake in the 20th century. On the shore of the lake, there are several "rustic shelters" that provide scenic views of the water.

Ice skating, popularized in Central Park, was a key reason for including Prospect Lake in the design of the park's watercourse. In the late nineteenth and early twentieth centuries, red balls raised on the fronts of trolley cars signified that the ice was at least four inches thick. Red flags were also placed at Grand Army Plaza to indicate the ice's sufficient thickness. Later, green flags were used to indicate that the ice was thick enough, and red flags indicated that the ice was too thin. Since then, safety concerns have ended skating on the lake; as a result of climate change, winters have become warmer in the 21st century compared to the 19th century, the ice on the lake has become too thin to accommodate skaters. Ice skating moved to the Kate Wollman Rink in 1960, and again to the Lakeside Center in 2012.

=== The Ravine ===
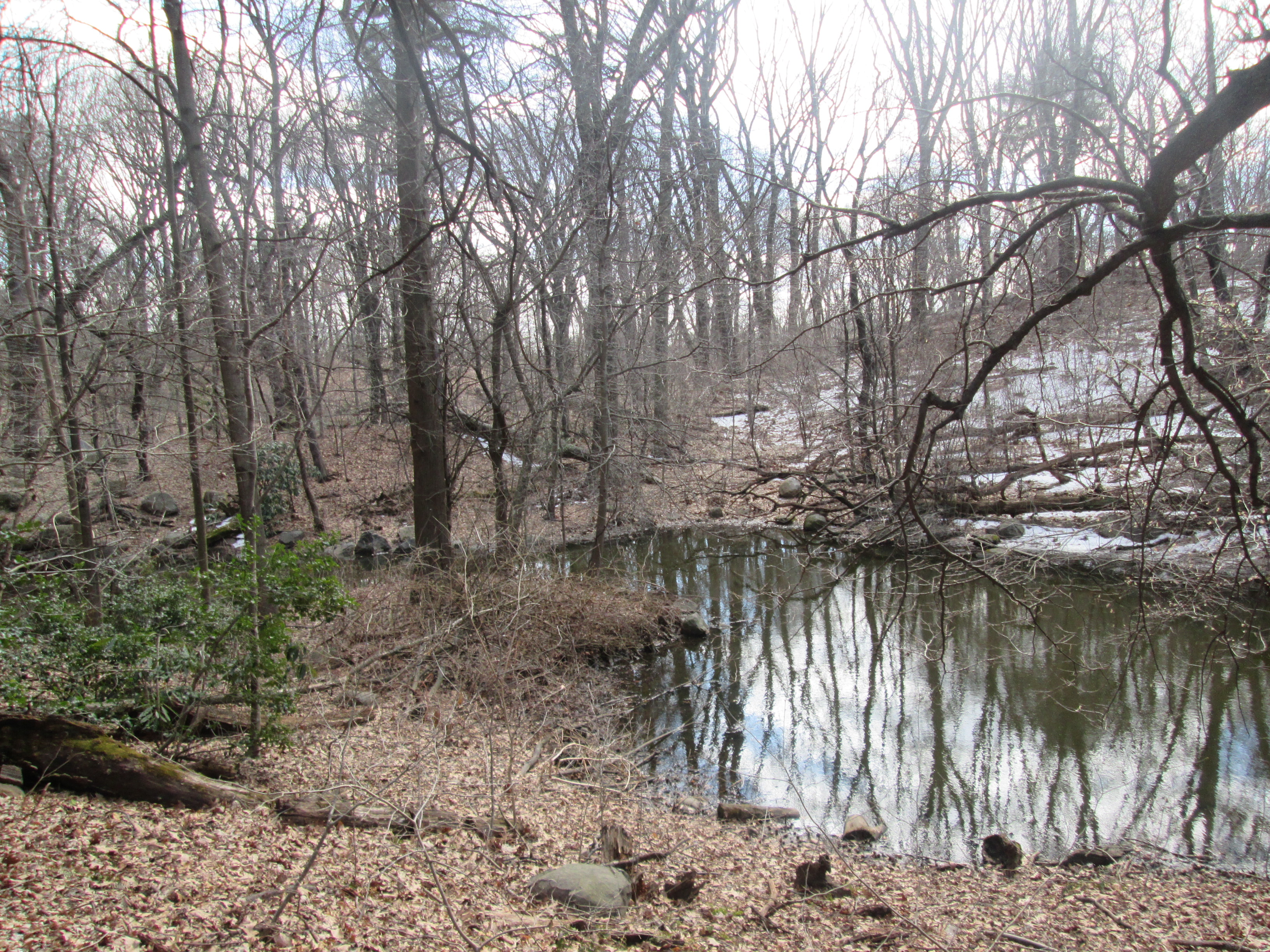
View of the watercourse inside the Ravine

A 146-acre (59 ha) section of Prospect Park's interior is known as the Ravine. The region contains the headwaters of the park's water system, as well as Brooklyn's only remaining old-growth forest, the Midwood. Olmsted and Vaux saw the Ravine as the heart of Prospect Park and the centerpiece of mountainous tableaux similar to the Adirondack Mountains, and designed it in a similar fashion to their Ramble in Central Park. The perimeter of the area is a steep, narrow 100-foot (30 m) gorge. The watercourse goes through the Ravine en route to the Boathouse.

The original design of the Ravine was more aesthetic than functional, and decades of deferred maintenance had degraded the Ravine and made it hard to drain. During the 1970s, the brush was trimmed in order to make it harder for muggers to hide, and by the 1990s, the stream had dried up. In 1996, still recovering from decades of overuse that caused soil compaction and erosion, the Ravine and surrounding woodlands underwent a $4.5 million restoration. The Ravine was opened for tours two years later. By 2002, part of the Ravine had been restored and opened to the public.

Directly south of the Ravine is a meadow called the Nethermead, which occupies much of the space along the western bank of the watercourse between Center and Wellhouse Drive. To the southwest of the Nethermead is Lookout Hill, which occupies the remaining area between Center and Wellhouse Drives.

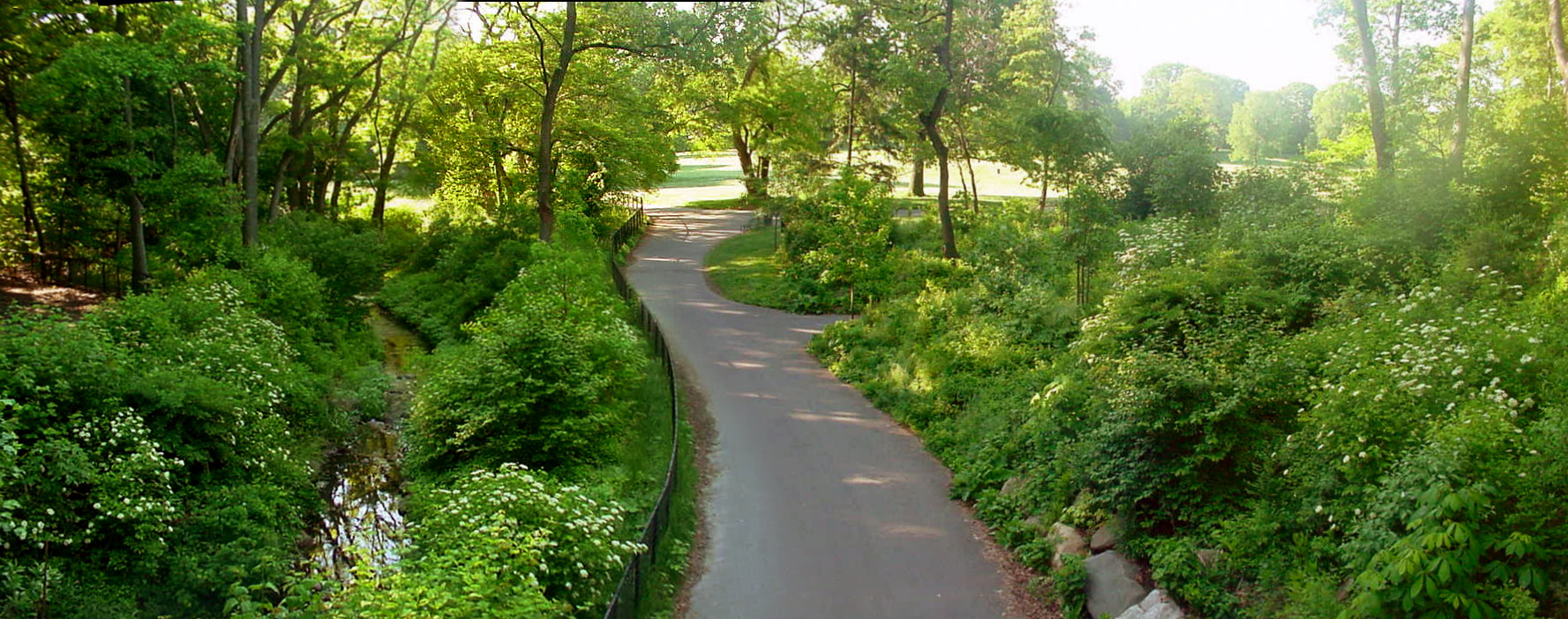
Southward view from the Nethermead Arches toward the Nethermead

=== Long Meadow ===
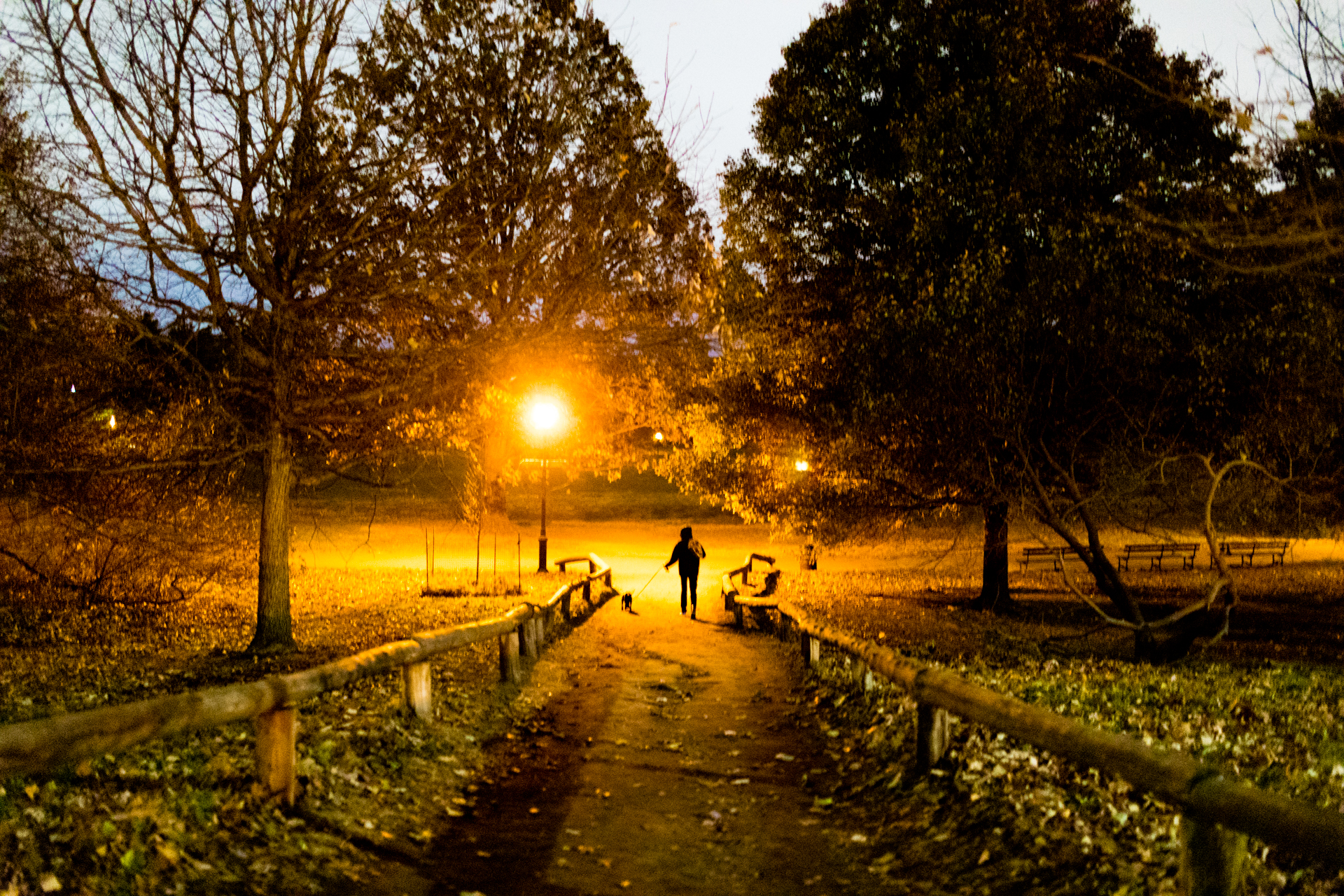
A man and his dog enter Long Meadow from the west

The Long Meadow stretches down the western side of Prospect Park. The meadow contains two playgrounds, the Tennis House, the Picnic House, a bandshell, a dog beach, and NYC Parks maintenance facilities. In a contrast with the Ravine and the watercourse, the Long Meadow is mostly flat open space. As designed, it provided a visual buffer between the neighborhoods to the west and the interior of the park. During construction, Olmsted laid out hundreds of trees in meticulous patterns around the meadow.

Originally, the Long Meadow hosted sports such as archery, croquet, bowling, football, baseball, and tennis. To preserve the meadow's pastoral quality, sheep grazed on the meadow until the 1930s. Today, much of the Long Meadow is used for a variety of purposes. The southern part of the Long Meadow contains seven baseball fields.

== Fauna and flora ==
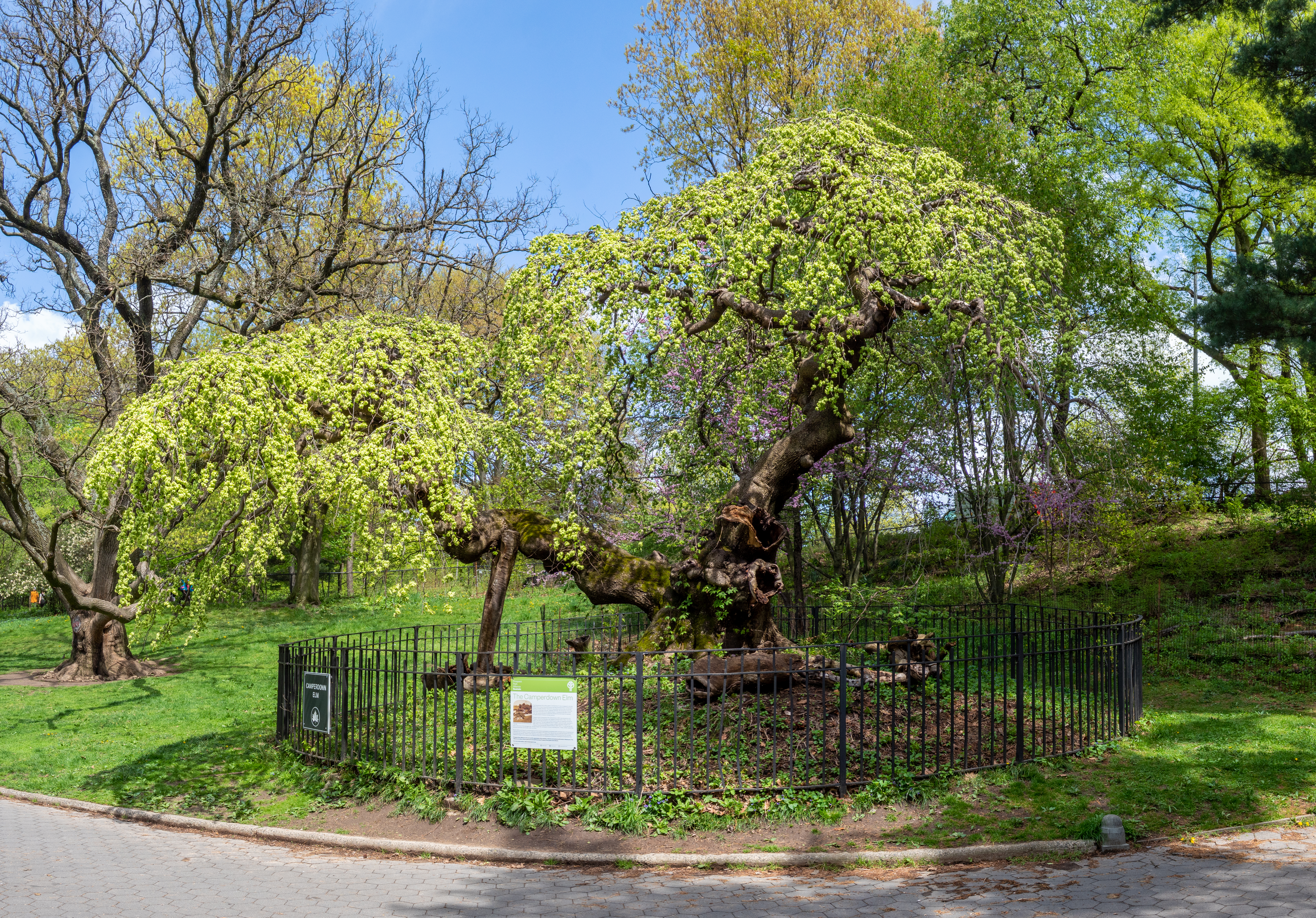
Prospect Park's Camperdown Elm

As of 2018, Prospect Park had 30,000 trees, comprising around 200 unique species. With few exceptions, the trees in Prospect Park were mostly planted manually. In its earliest years, Prospect Park had maintained a nursery of trees and plants, from which over a hundred thousand specimens were eventually taken. Now, Prospect Park Alliance regularly maintains the park's flora, removing invasive species and adding native plants. Prospect Park contains four "great trees" that are specially recognized by NYC Parks. These include a Camperdown Elm south of the Boathouse, among the first planted in the United States; an American Hornbeam and a Japanese Pagodatree located near the Camperdown Elm; and an English Elm along West Drive. In late 2011, an oak tree was planted in the park as a memorial to Brooklyn native Peter Steele, a member of the band Type O Negative who had died in 2010.

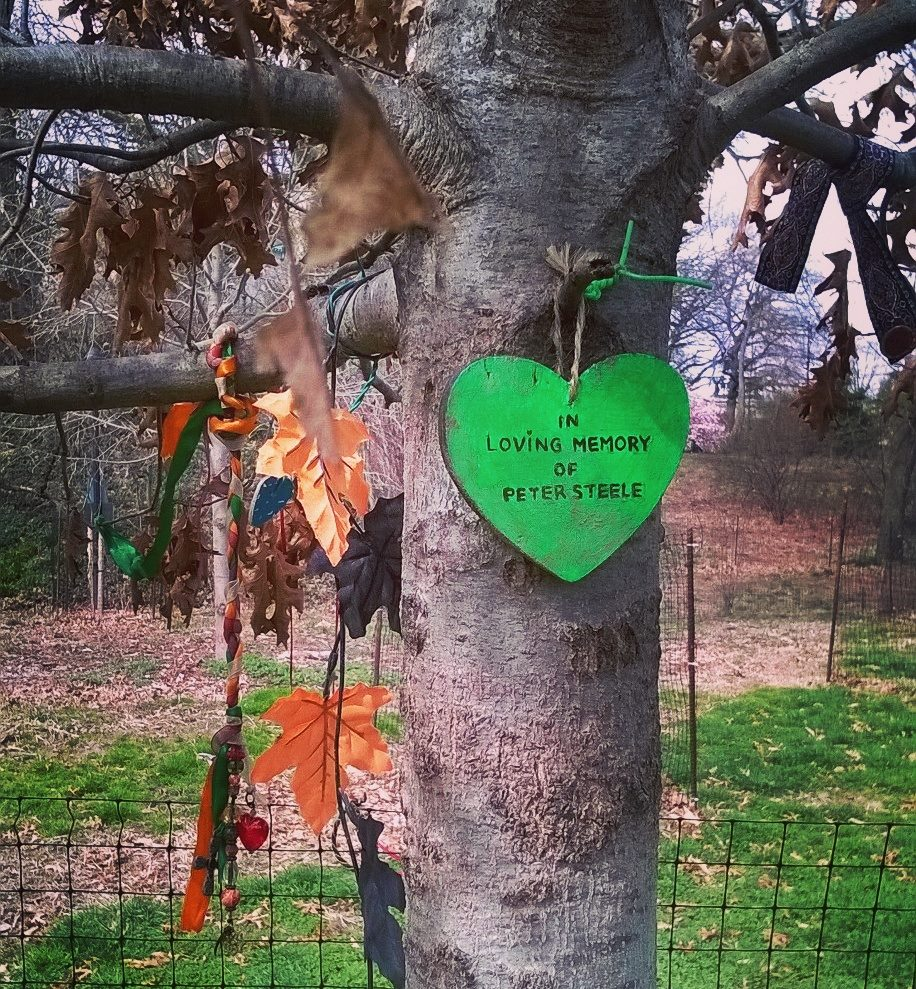
An oak tree was planted in memory of Type O Negative's Peter Steele in 2011 in Prospect Park. Fans of the band have hung tributes.

Prospect Park also accommodates a significant bird population. Each year, hundreds of migratory bird species stop at the park, and during winters, urban birdwatchers have reported seeing 60 unique species at the park on a good day, and 100 unique species over a typical season. Over the years, a total of 298 species have been recorded at Prospect Park, including 11 not seen at other city parks. Though there are no official lists of birds that have been seen at the park, the Brooklyn Bird Club has kept records of the avian species seen there between 1967 and 1990. Popular spots for birds included Lookout and Quaker Hills, the Ravine, the Vale of Cashmere, and Lily Pond.

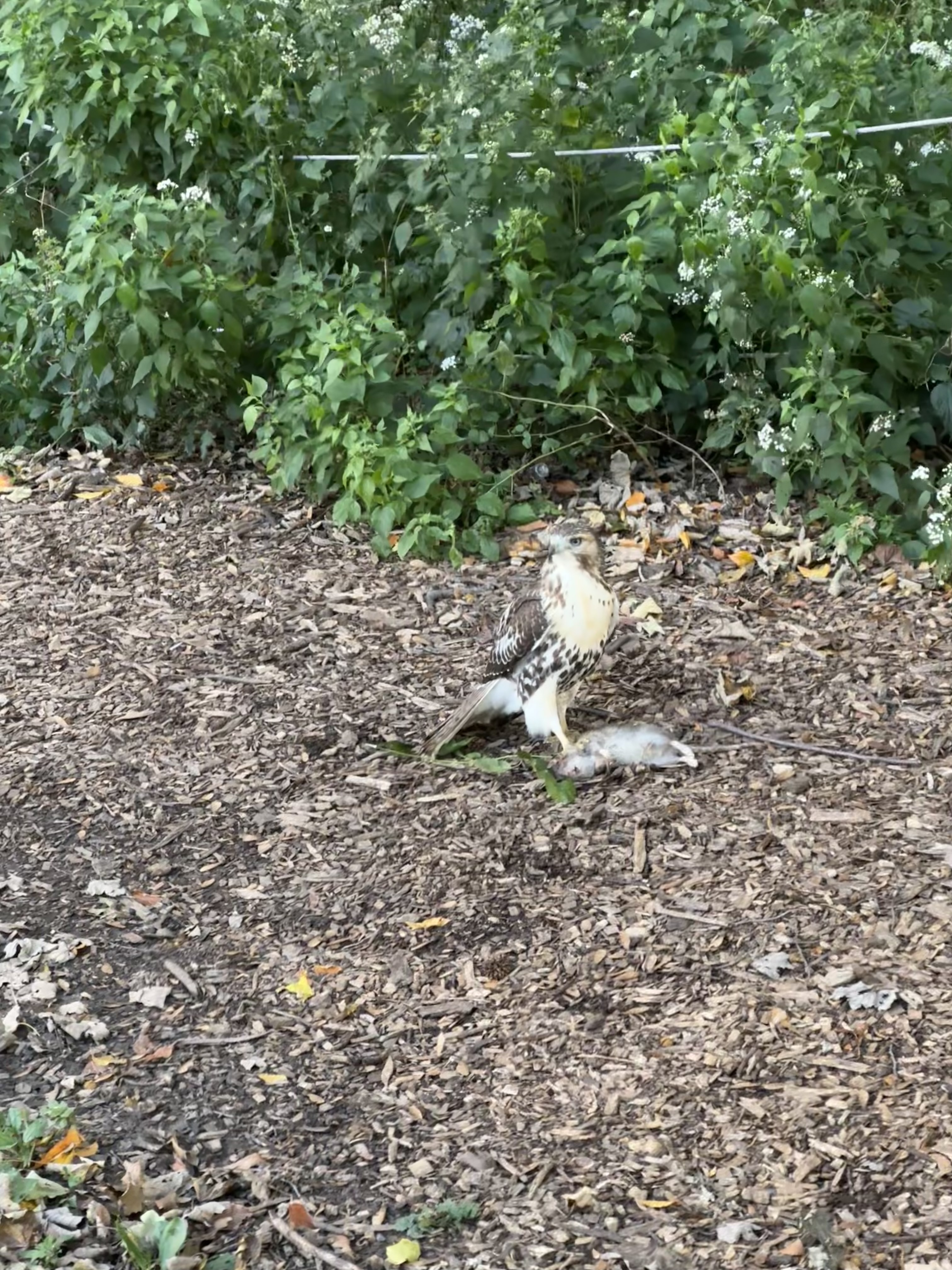
A Red-tailed hawk with its rodent prey in Prospect Park

There are other fauna species in Prospect Park as well. In particular, the watercourse includes waterfowl, turtles, bullfrogs, fish, and crustacean species. In addition, squirrels are commonly seen in the park's trees. Sightings of butterflies are also common, and since the 1990s and 2000s, increasing numbers of bats have been seen in Prospect Park.

== Landmarks and structures ==
=== Plazas and entrances ===
Prospect Park is shaped roughly like a concave hexagon. There are three circles or plazas on the exterior corners of Prospect Park; all of these circles and plazas contain "major" park entrances.

==== Major entrances ====
Grand Army Plaza is an oval plaza at the northern corner, at the junction of Prospect Park West, Flatbush Avenue, Eastern Parkway, and several side streets. Olmsted and Vaux had intended for the plaza to be the park's main entrance, and it was constructed along with the park during the late 1860s. Grand Army Plaza's largest feature is the Soldiers' and Sailors' Arch, a large triumphal arch in the center of the oval, which was dedicated in 1892. The plaza also includes four Doric columns, built 1894–1896; the Bailey Fountain, constructed 1929–1932 on the site of two former fountains; and several statues of famous figures.

Bartel-Pritchard Square, which is actually a circle, is at the far western corner of Prospect Park, at the junction of Prospect Park West and Southwest, where they turn into Ninth Avenue and 15th Street respectively. Dedicated with its present name in 1923, it is named after Brooklyn residents Emil Bartel and William Pritchard, who died in combat during World War I. The park entrance from the square was designed by Stanford White in 1896.

Machate Circle is at the southwestern corner, at the junction of Prospect Park West, Ocean Parkway, and Parkside Avenue. Originally named Park Circle, it was renamed in 1989 in honor of a police officer killed in the line of duty. The park entrance from Machate Circle was also designed by Stanford White.

Additional "major" entrances exist at the Parade Ground, on the park's south side; Parkside and Ocean Avenues, at the park's southeast corner; and Willink Hill, at Flatbush and Ocean Avenues on the eastern border. The Ocean/Parkside and Willink entrances were designed in the neoclassical style by McKim, Mead and White, and were built in the 1890s and 1900s. The Willink entrance is flanked by a pair of granite turrets, while the Ocean/Parkside entrance is located between the two portions of a curved granite colonnade. Opposite the Willink entrance, there are the Flatbush Trees, three concrete cylinders with green sheet metal canopies, installed in 1979 and redecorated in 2015.

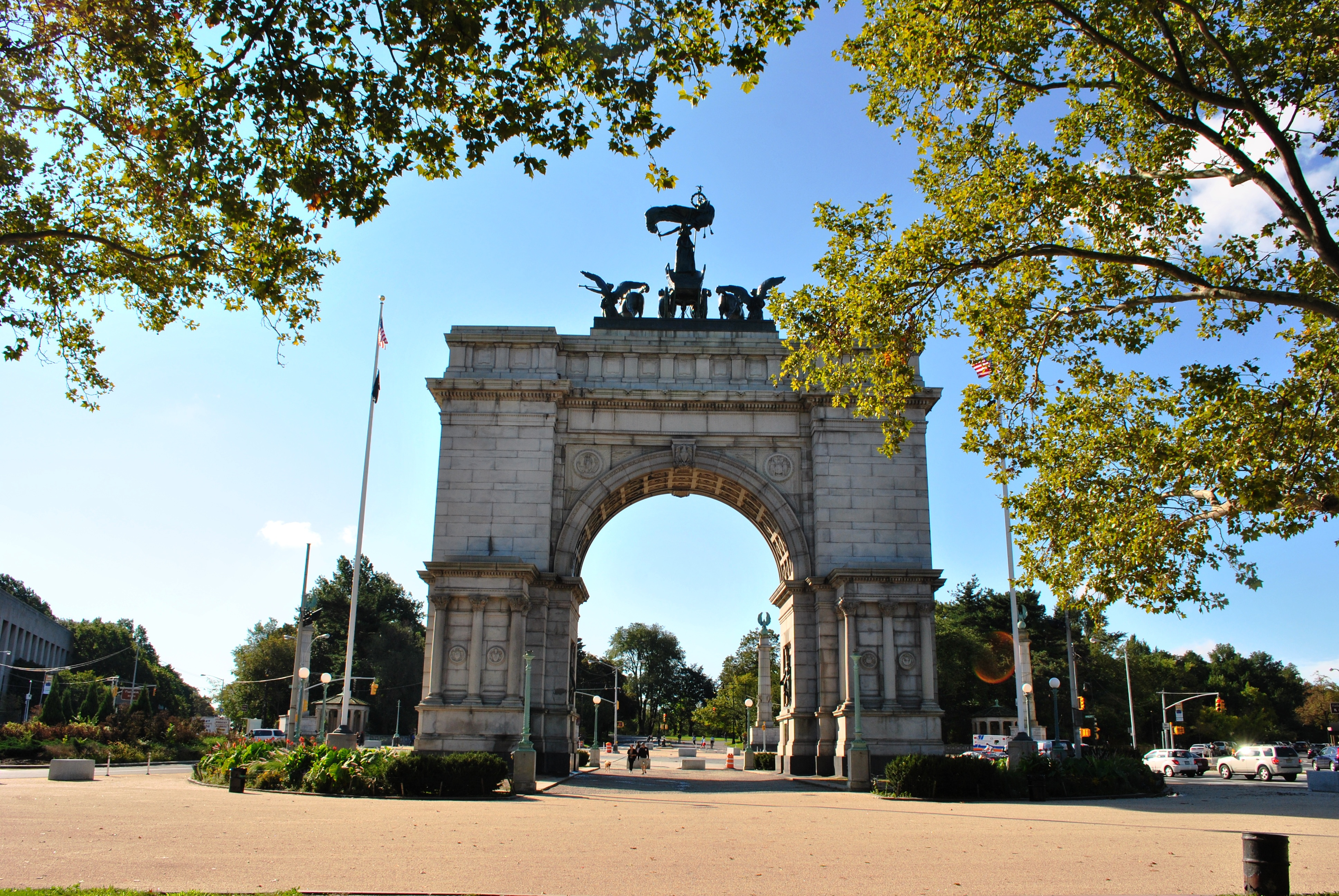
The Soldiers' and Sailors' Arch in Grand Army Plaza

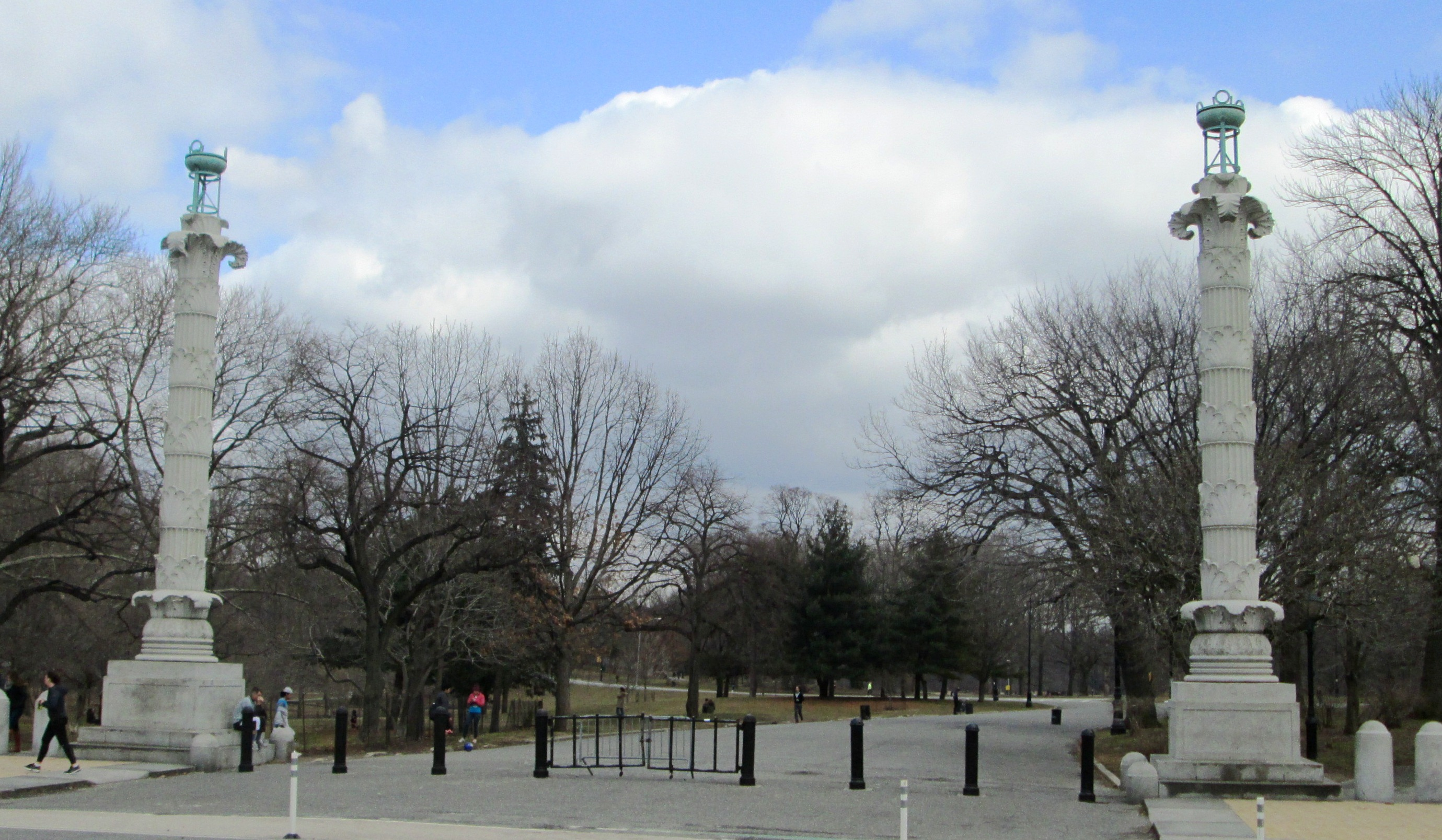
The columns at the park entrance outside Bartel-Pritchard Square

==== Other entrances ====
There are numerous other entrances spaced out along the park's border. These include five entrances on Prospect Park West, four on Prospect Park Southwest, and three on Ocean Avenue on the park's eastern border. In total, there are eighteen park entrances. Of these, the Third, Ninth, and 16th Street and Lincoln Road entrances are considered "major entrances", and are flanked by memorials or other decorations. No entrances to Prospect Park have been built since the 1940s, but two entrances were proposed for the Flatbush Avenue side in 2016 and are expected to be completed in mid-2020.

=== Bridges ===
==== Arches ====
Arches
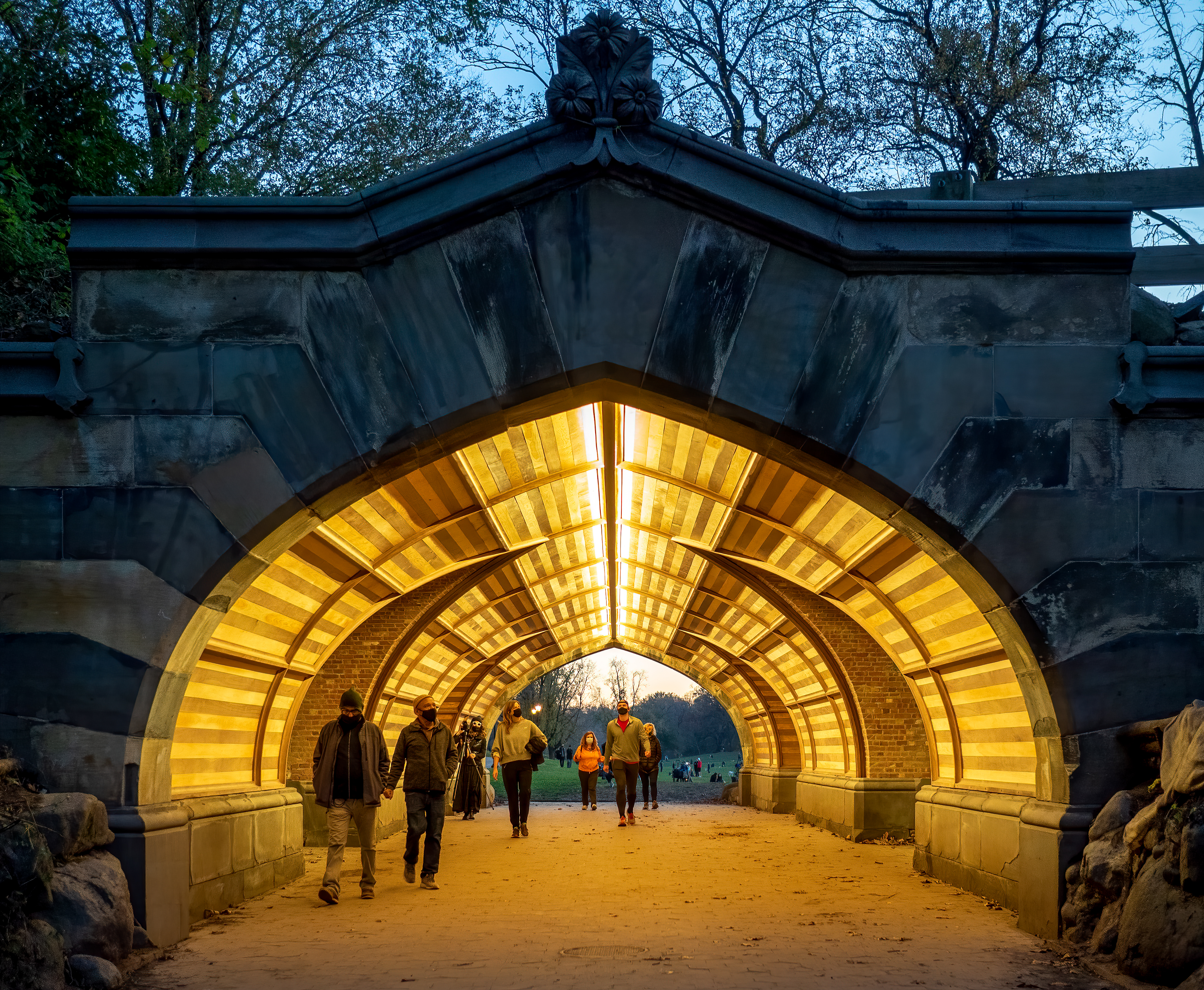
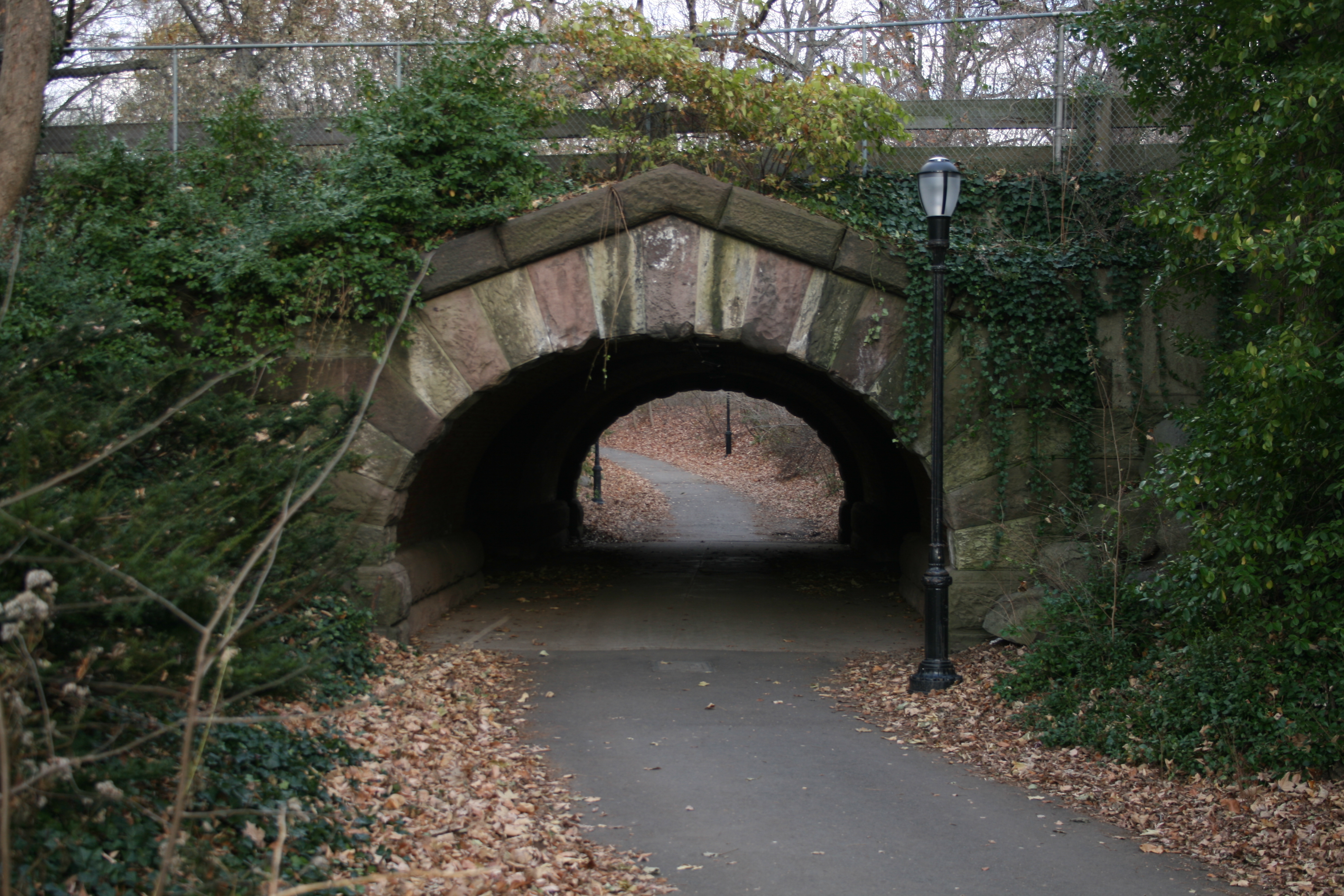
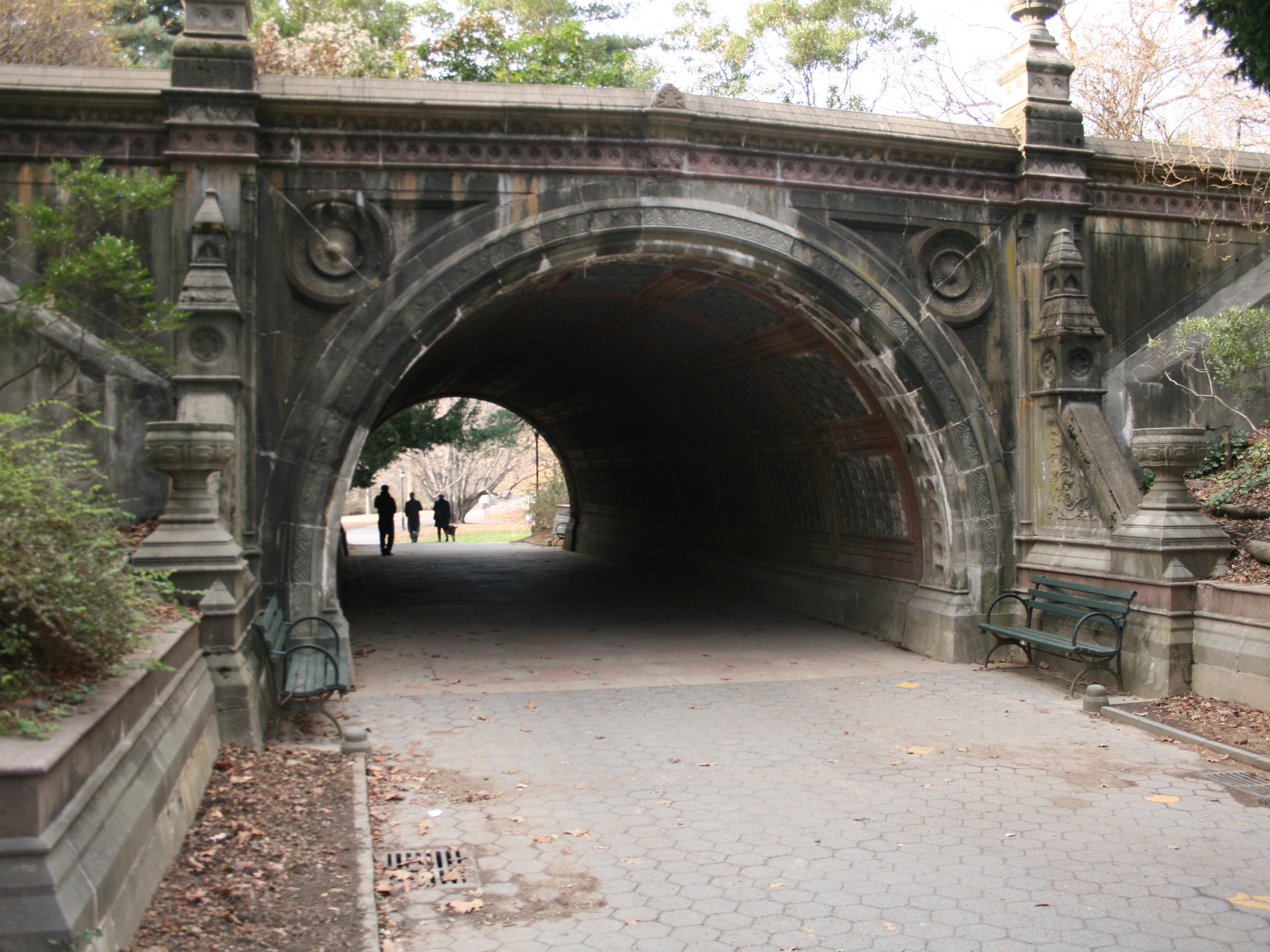
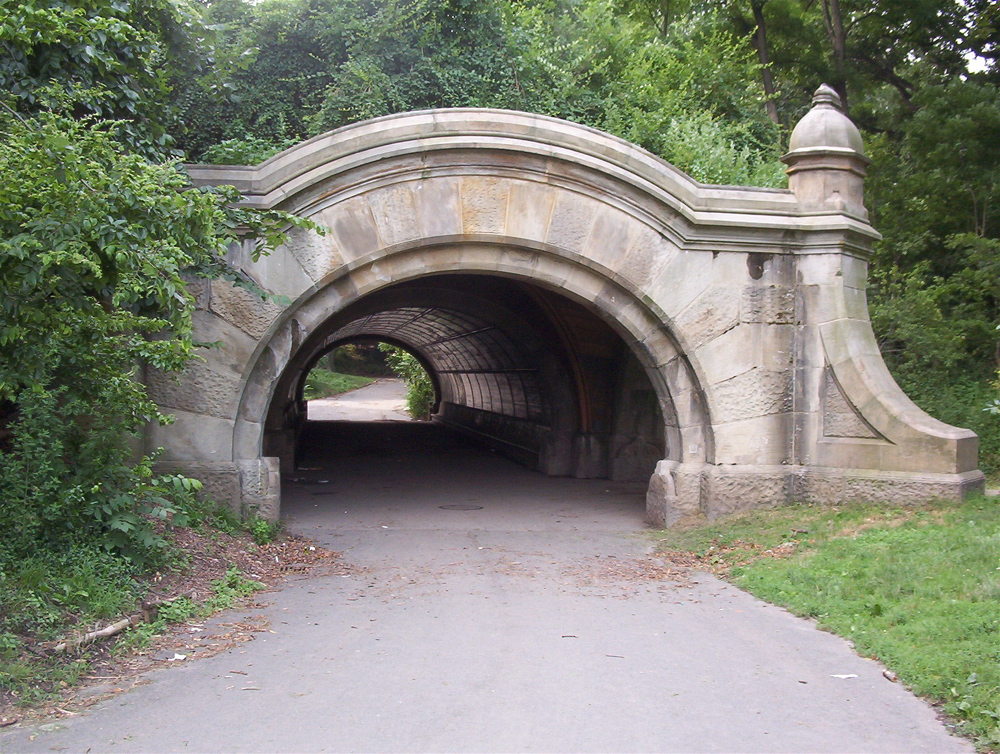
Clockwise from top left: Endale Arch (restored in 2020), East Wood Arch, Meadowport Arch, and Cleft Ridge Span

Prospect Park originally included several arched bridges to provide grade-separated crossings for pedestrian and vehicular traffic; usually, the vehicular drive was located on top of the arch, and the pedestrian path was below. This contrasted with other parks at the time, which did not contain such separations. The arches were designed to be as small and natural-looking as possible so they did not interfere with the scenery. For the most part, the spaces under the arches were originally outfitted with benches, while the arches themselves blended with the foliage. Five arched bridges were ultimately built, all during the late 1860s and early 1870s.

Endale Arch, also known as Enterdale Arch, is located under East Drive, slightly south of the Grand Army Plaza entrance on the north side of the park, and adjacent to the northeast side of Long Meadow. It was one of the first two arches to be completed, in 1868. Its exterior contained interspersed yellow Ohio sandstone and red New Jersey brownstone. The interior was composed of brick set between alternately black and yellow wooden stripes, designed as such to prevent condensation from dripping downward. Endale Arch contained seats underneath it, but these were later removed. In 2014, the Prospect Park Alliance began a five-year restoration of the arch, which was completed in 2020.

East Wood Arch (or Eastwood Arch) is also located under East Drive, connecting the Nethermead Arch to the Willink Hill entrance on the eastern side of Prospect Park. It was the second of the two arches to be completed in 1868. East Wood Arch had a similar design to the Endale Arch, but had a simpler semicircular shape.

Meadowport Arch is located on the northwest side of Long Meadow and passes under West Drive. It was completed in 1870. There were two portals at its eastern end, perpendicular to each other, creating a cross-vault. The arch had Ohio sandstone and wooden lining inside, and the portals contained circular cornices, outward-facing piers, and octagonal domed finials. Meadowport Arch was restored in the 1980s, but has since fallen into disrepair.

Nethermead Arch, also completed c. 1870, carries Center Drive through the center of the park. The bridge contains three arches: one each above the Ambergill, the park path, and the bridle path. The span is made of Ohio sandstone and contains a trim of granite. Unlike some of the other arches, Nethermead did not have any interior wood, but instead, had patterned red brick. The New York Times described its triple span as "one of the most astonishing structures in any city park".

Cleft Ridge Span is located under Wellhouse Drive, at Breeze Hill, on the eastern side of Prospect Park. It was the final arch span to be opened, in 1872. The span was distinctive in its use of red, ochre, and pale gray concrete blocks called "Béton Coignet". Cleft Ridge might have been the first concrete arch span in the United States. Both the interior and exterior designs were elaborate, though these have since eroded.

==== Other spans ====
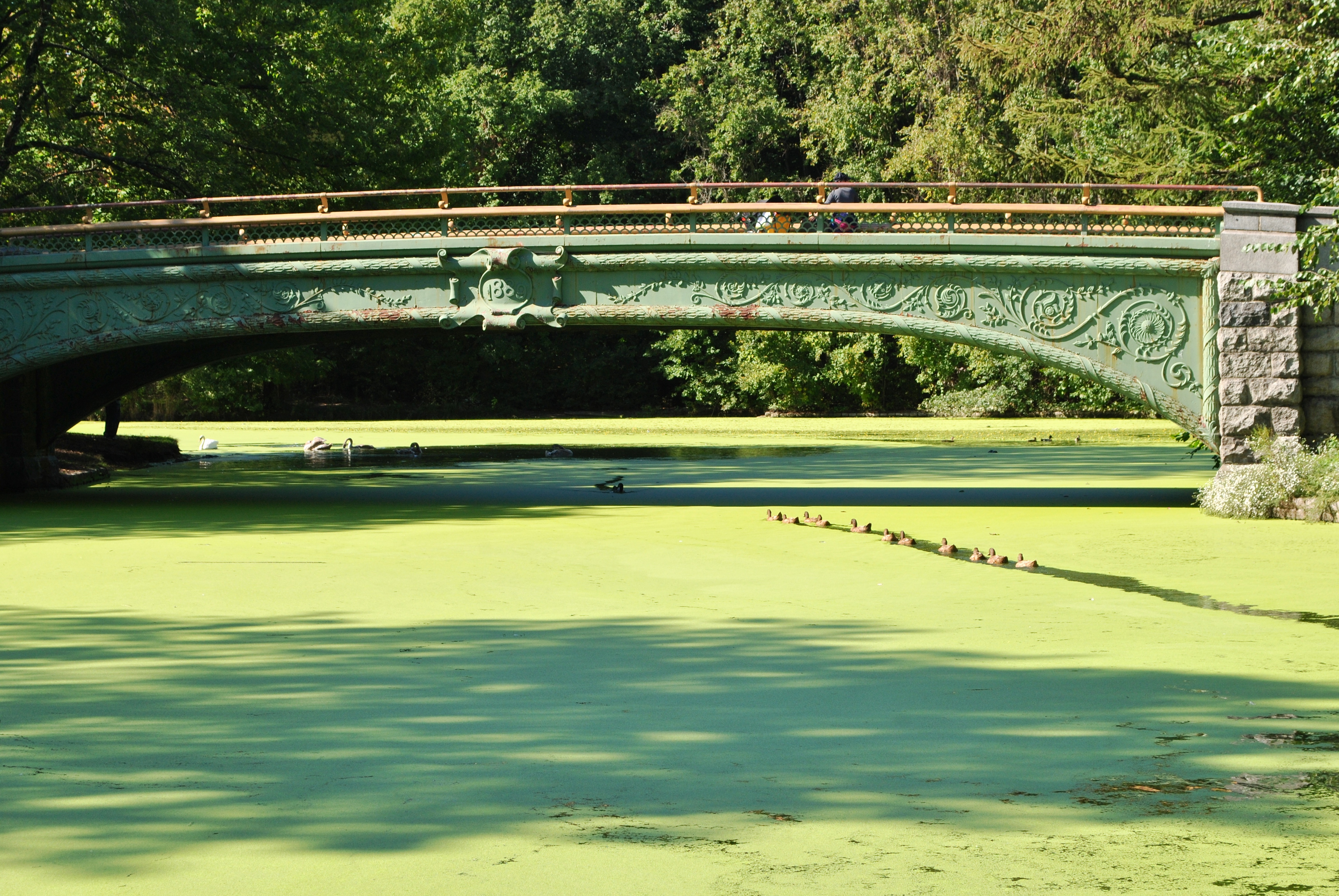
Lullwater Bridge

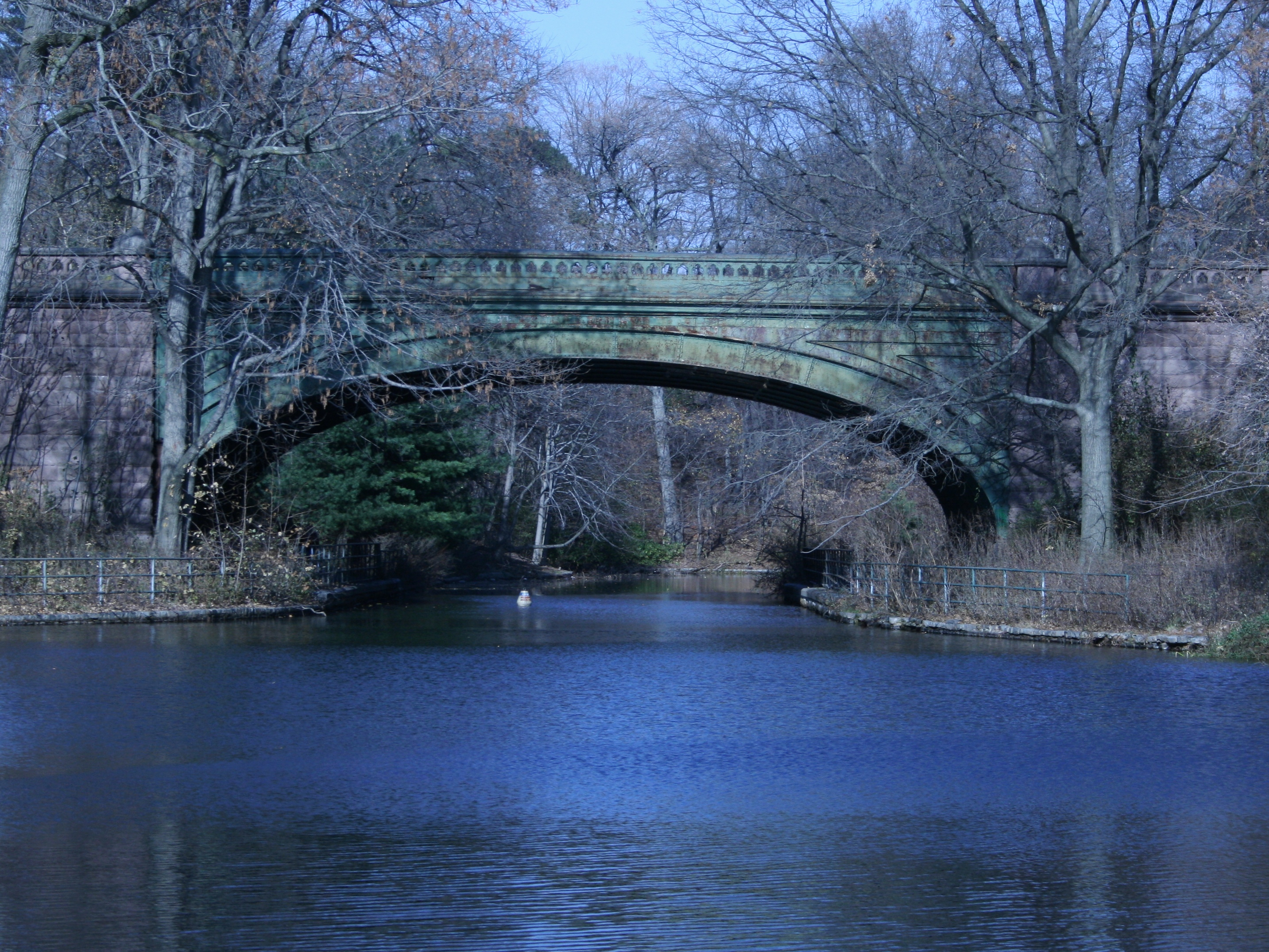
Terrace Bridge

Lullwater Bridge and Terrace Bridge are the only bridges across the watercourse that were built to handle automobile traffic. Lullwater Bridge is located just downstream of the Boathouse, on Prospect Park's eastern side. The current metal span, built in 1905, replaces an oak bridge on the site that was originally constructed in 1868. Further downstream, Terrace Bridge carries Well House Drive over the watercourse just before it empties into the lake. Built in 1890, Terrace Bridge also replaced an earlier wooden span, and it contains cast-iron tracery and brick vaults underneath, which have since deteriorated. It was so named because it was supposed to overlook the unbuilt Refectory, which had been canceled following the 1873 financial crisis.

From northwest to southeast, the Fallkill, Esdale, Nethermead Arch, Rock Arch, Music Grove, and Binnen Bridges also cross the watercourse upstream of the Lullwater Bridge. Fallkill, Esdale, and Rock Arch Bridges are located northwest of Nethermead Arch, while Music Grove and Binnen Bridges are located southeast of the arch. At the source of the watercourse, Fallkill and Esdale Bridges are both intended to look like wooden bridges, though are made of steel and concrete frames. Rock Arch Bridge, a boulder-lined span, crosses over Ambergill Falls; the waterfall had once been buried by the bridge's stonework, but was restored in the late 20th century when the bridge was rehabilitated. To the south, Binnen Bridge and Music Grove Bridge were both designed as wood bridges. Binnen Bridge is located just north of the Lullwater, while Music Grove Bridge further upstream is located next to the Music Pagoda.

=== Drives and paths ===
When it was built, Prospect Park did not have any transverse roadways. Instead, it was circled by a series of four scenic drives, named West, Center, Wellhouse, and East Drive. The drives are paralleled by a more extensive system of pedestrian and bridle paths. Several paths in the park, as well as East Drive, follow ancient Native American trails.

The drives were originally 40 feet (12 m) wide and paved with gravel. The main loop, composed of West and East Drives, meanders around the park just inside its boundaries. The loops were paved with asphalt and opened to automobiles in 1918. Over the following decades, the hours at which vehicles could use the park were slowly restricted. Supporters of a car ban argued that the park should be a haven from the type of city stress that automobiles represent, and that having them use the park sacrifices the safety of those using the park for recreation, while opponents worried that banning traffic in the park would increase traffic outside. The park's West Drive was closed to traffic in 2015. Following a trial run in which the park was car-free during summer 2017, the city determined that there were no major effects on nearby routes, and cars were barred completely from the park beginning in January 2018. All of the drives are designated as protected bike lanes.

There are also four hiking trails inside Prospect Park: the Lullwater, Midwood, Peninsula, and Waterfall trails. They range in length from 0.5 to 1.0 mile (0.80 to 1.61 km), and NYC Parks classifies all of the trails as "easy". The trails are named after the section of the park where they are located.

=== Monuments and statues ===
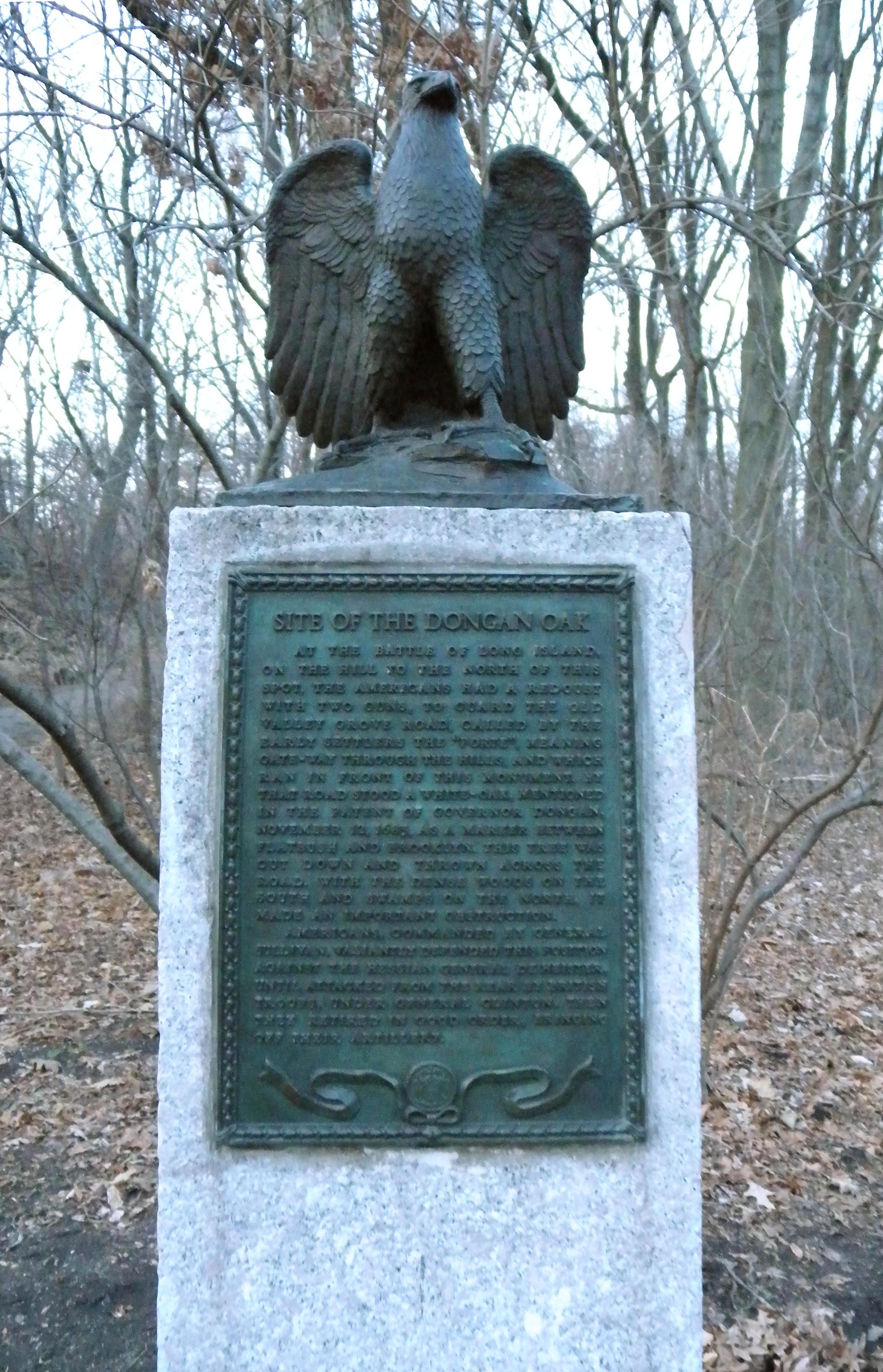
Dongan Oak monument, marking a fighting site in Battle of Long Island

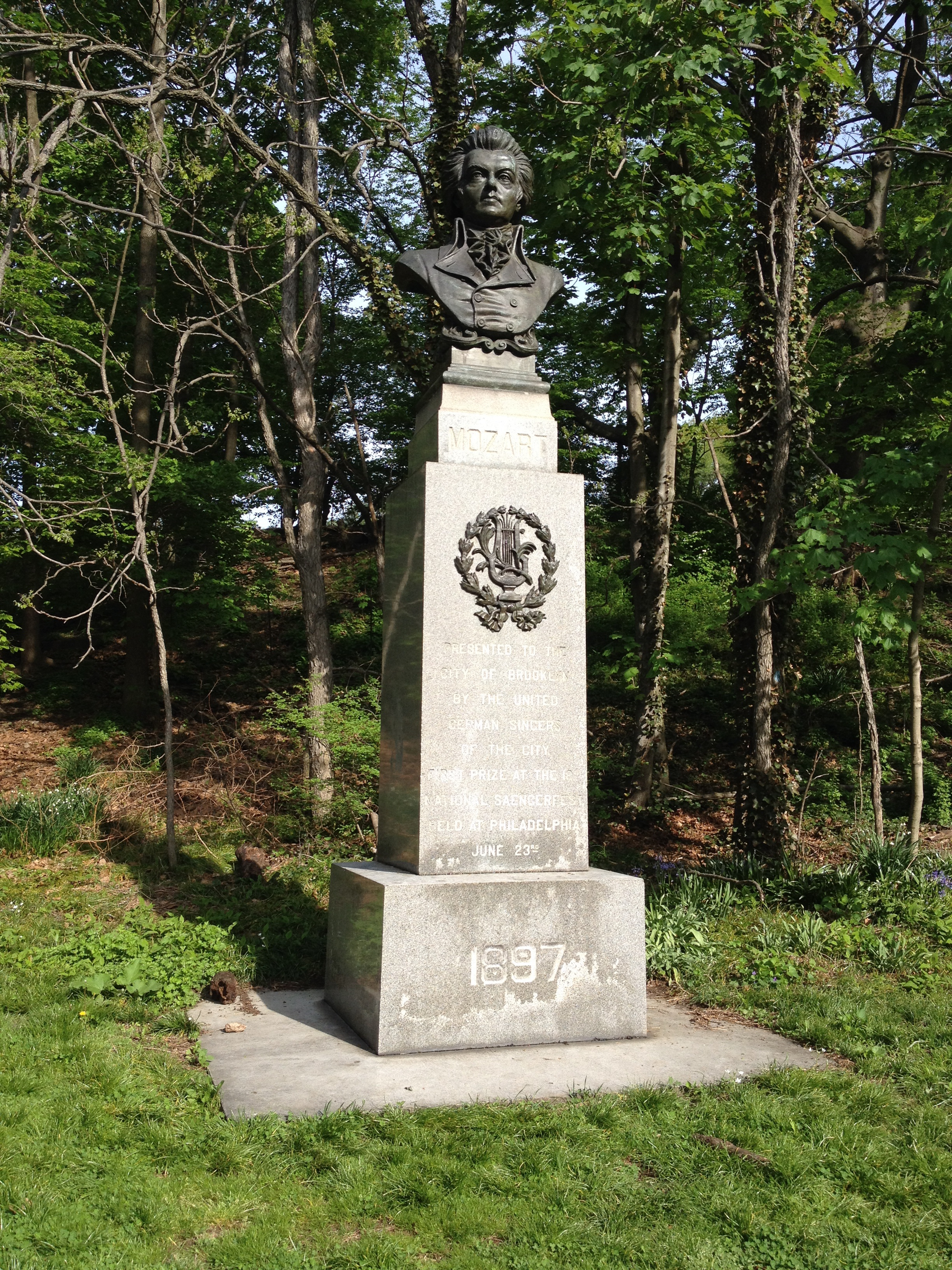
Mozart monument, erected in 1897

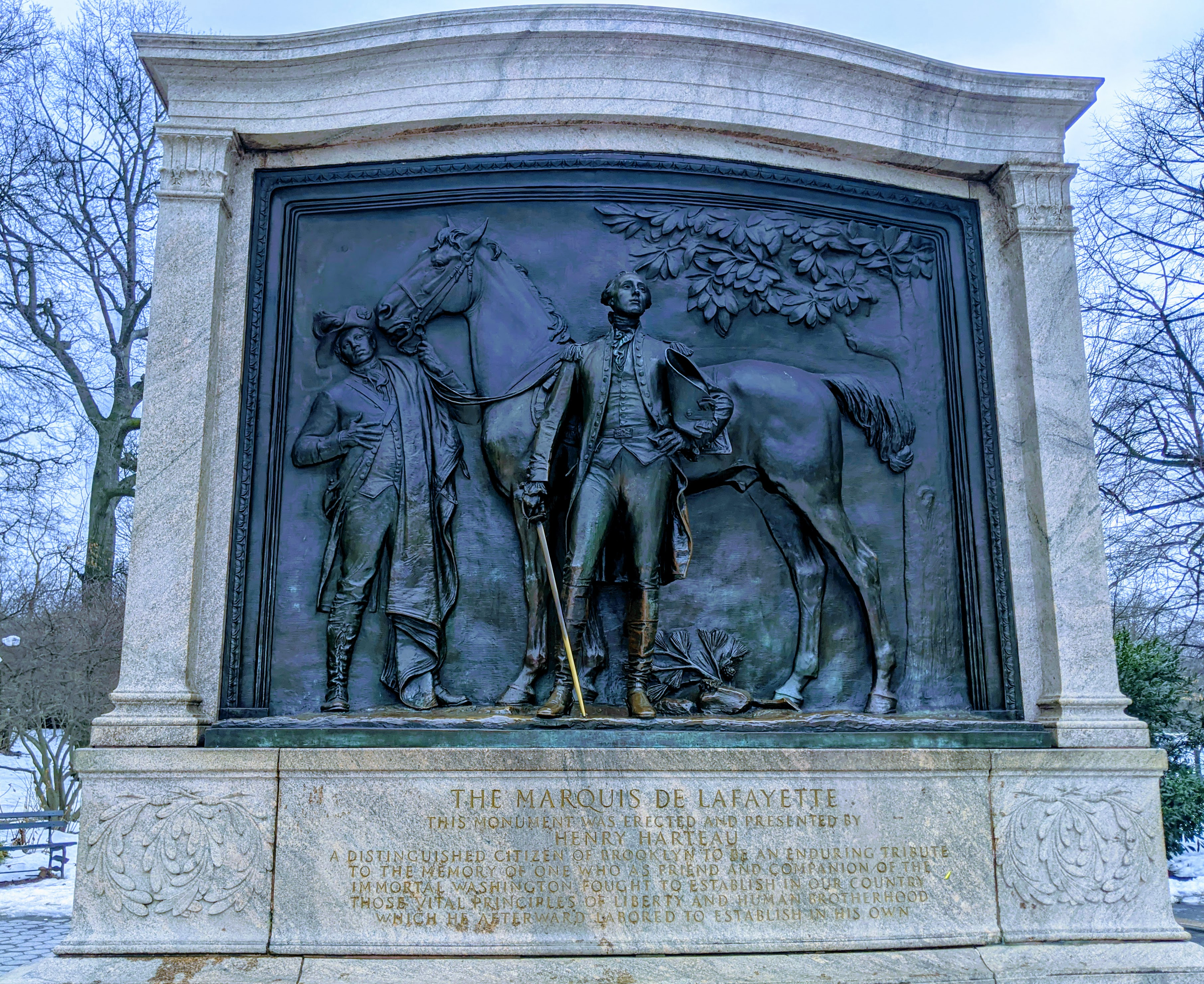
The Lafayette Memorial by Daniel Chester French, 1917

Prospect Park contains dozens of monuments and statues to notable figures, including:

- A bronze statue of Abraham Lincoln, sculpted by Henry Kirke Brown in 1869. Originally situated in Grand Army Plaza, it was relocated to the Concert Grove in Prospect Park in 1896, and restored in the late 1980s. With the Concert Grove's restoration in the 2010s, it was proposed to move the statue back to its original position, but As of 2016, it was still located in the Concert Grove.
- A bronze-on-marble statue of James S.T. Stranahan, sculpted by Frederick MacMonnies and located near the Grand Army Plaza entrance. It was dedicated in 1891 and honors Stranahan, one of the key figures in the park's development.
- The Lafayette Memorial, a bas-relief on granite at the Ninth Street entrance on the park's west side. The monument, which honors Gilbert du Motier, Marquis de Lafayette, was sculpted by Daniel Chester French and was completed in 1917.
- The Maryland Monument, a Corinthian column near Terrace Bridge. It was created by Stanford White and dedicated in 1895. The column commemorates the Maryland 400, members of the 1st Maryland Regiment who charged British forces on Lookout Hill in the Battle of Long Island during the American Revolution, despite being outnumbered.
- The Prospect Park War Memorial, along the eastern shore of the lake. Sculpted by Henry Augustus Lukeman, it was dedicated in 1921. The memorial consists of two bronze figures in front of a curved wall with memorial plaques, containing the names of 2,800 people who died during World War I.
- Monuments to classical composers, including Beethoven, Mozart, and von Weber, in Concert Grove. The surrounding area also contains tributes to poet Thomas Moore, writer Washington Irving, and classical composer Edvard Grieg.
- A proposed monument of Shirley Chisholm at the Parkside and Ocean Avenues entrance. The design, by artists Amanda Williams and Olalekan Jeyifous, was approved by the city government in 2023.

=== Notable structures ===
==== West side and Long Meadow ====
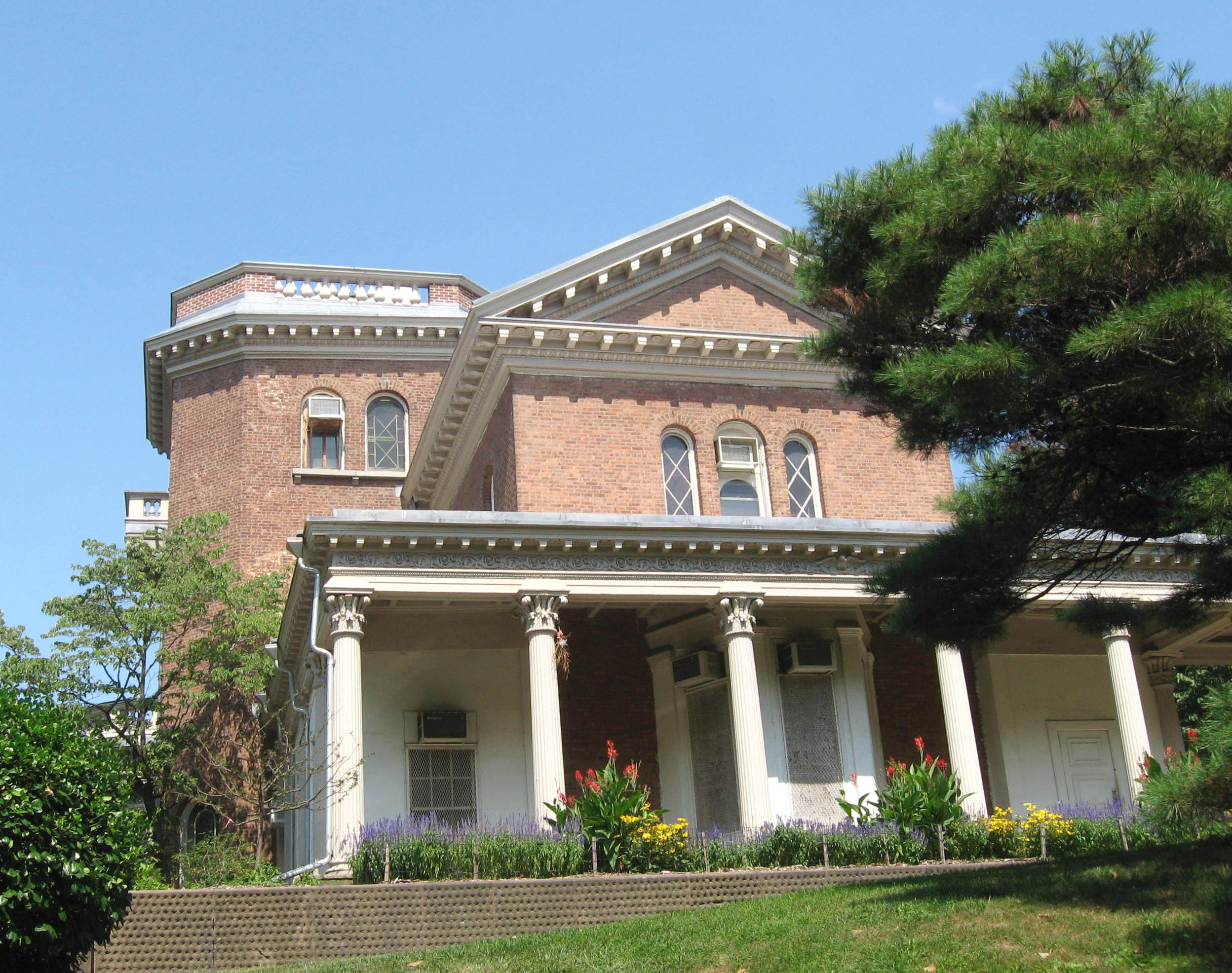
Litchfield Villa, on the west side of the park

The Picnic House is located in Long Meadow on Prospect Park's west side. Built in 1927, it replaced an earlier rustic structure that had burned down the previous year. The structure was designed by J. Sarsfield Kennedy.

The Litchfield Villa is located near the intersection of 5th Street and Prospect Park West, directly west of the Picnic House. The building was originally a private residence built in 1854–1857 in the Italianate style. NYC Parks has used Litchfield Villa as a maintenance and office building since the late 19th century. The villa was listed on the National Register of Historic Places (NRHP) in 1977. A garage compound used by NYC Parks abuts the villa directly to the south.

The Tennis House, constructed in 1909–1910 by Helmle, Hudswell and Huberty, is located on the Long Meadow at West Drive, west of approximately 8th Street. The structure is a neoclassical structure made of limestone and brick, with a red tile roof. It was first used as a locker room for tennis players, but later was converted into a non-public NYC Parks facility. By the 2000s, the structure had become dilapidated. In 2017, it was announced that the Tennis House would be renovated and converted into restrooms as part of a $5.1 million, four-year project.

Roughly southeast of the Tennis House is the Dog Beach, on the western shore of the Fallkill section of the watercourse. It is often used by dogs and their owners during summers, since Prospect Park has an "off-leash" policy that allows unleashed dogs during early mornings and late evenings. The beach was restored in 2017.

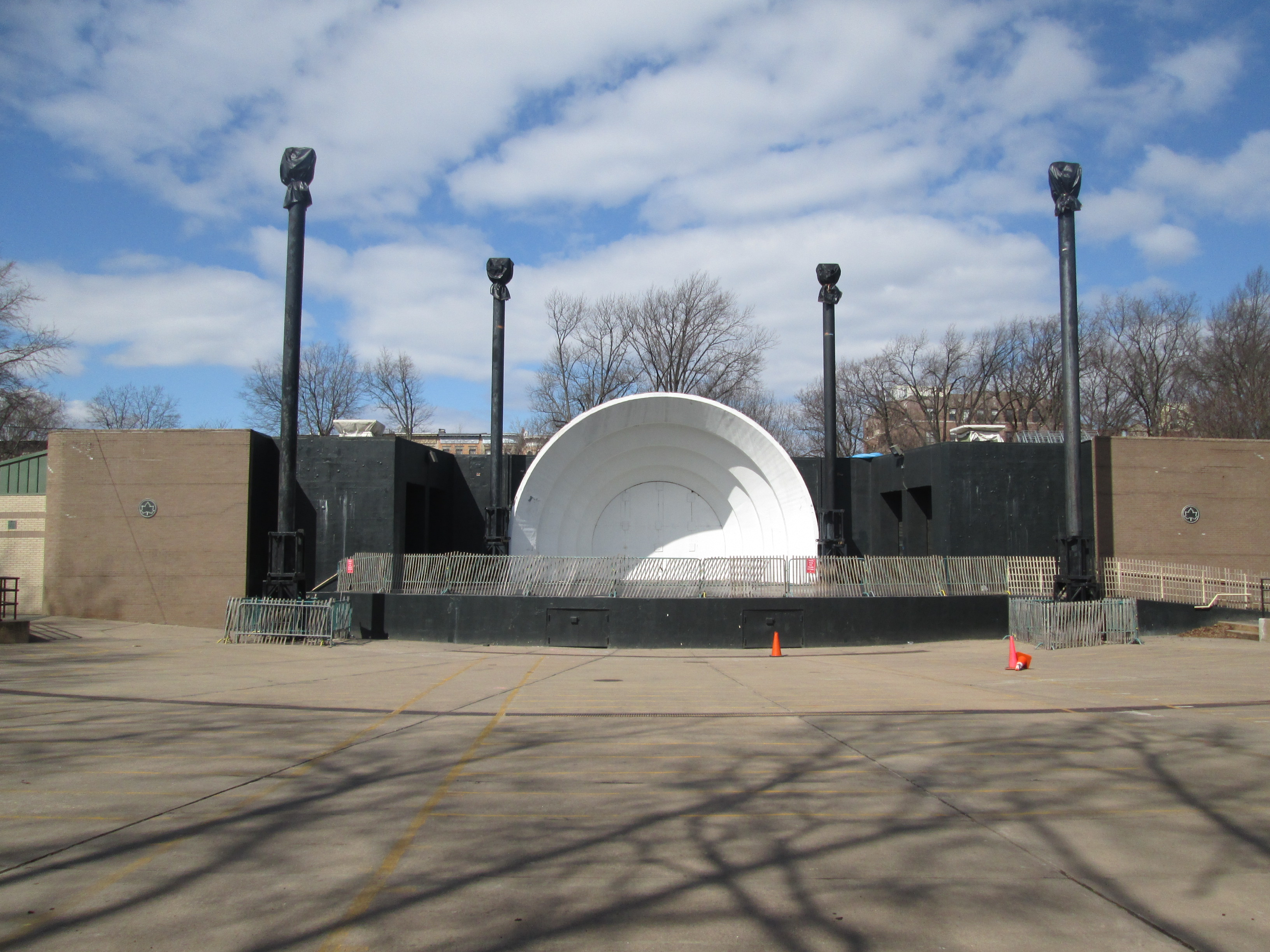
Bandshell

At 10th Street, to the west of West Drive, is the Harmony Playground and Bandshell. The bandshell, designed by Aymar Embury II, was built in 1939 on the site of a former "zoological site", which was used for archery and hockey. The bandshell and the adjacent playground were restored in 2000 and given a musical theme. In June 2021, the Prospect Park Bandshell was renamed the Lena Horne Bandshell to honor Lena Horne, a successful entertainer and Brooklyn native, as well as to show solidarity with the black community. The bandshell hosts numerous concerts every summer through the BRIC Celebrate Brooklyn! festival.

==== Northeast side ====
The Rose Garden is located next to Flatbush Avenue, on the north side of Prospect Park southwest of the Grand Army Plaza entrance. It was built on the site of the Playground, a lawn that had been the first part of Prospect Park to open. During the late 19th and early 20th century, the garden had roses and a goldfish pond. The Rose Garden was renovated in the 1960s, after which the garden did not host any roses. In 2017, the Prospect Park Alliance announced plans to restore the garden, and in the meantime, it placed 7,000 pinwheels in an effort to attract visitors.

To the west, adjacent to the Rose Garden, is another garden called the Vale of Cashmere. The garden was named after Thomas Moore's poem "Lalla Rookh", which in turn referred to Kashmir in what was then northern India. The Vale of Cashmere was once used frequently by the well-to-do. It contains a fountain that originally had a sculpture of a nude youth and six turtles in the center, though the sculpture was stolen in 1941. The Vale became overgrown during the 20th century, and its fountain was abandoned. The Vale of Cashmere later became a popular spot for gay cruising, as documented in the book In the Vale of Cashmere by Thomas Roma. The woods around the vale were damaged in 2012 during Hurricane Sandy and were subsequently restored.

The Prospect Park Zoo occupies a 12-acre (4.9 ha) plot slightly south of the Rose Garden across Flatbush Avenue from Brooklyn Botanic Garden. The zoo was opened in 1935 and has been operated by the Wildlife Conservation Society since 1980. As of 2016, Prospect Park Zoo had 864 animals representing 176 species.

==== East side ====
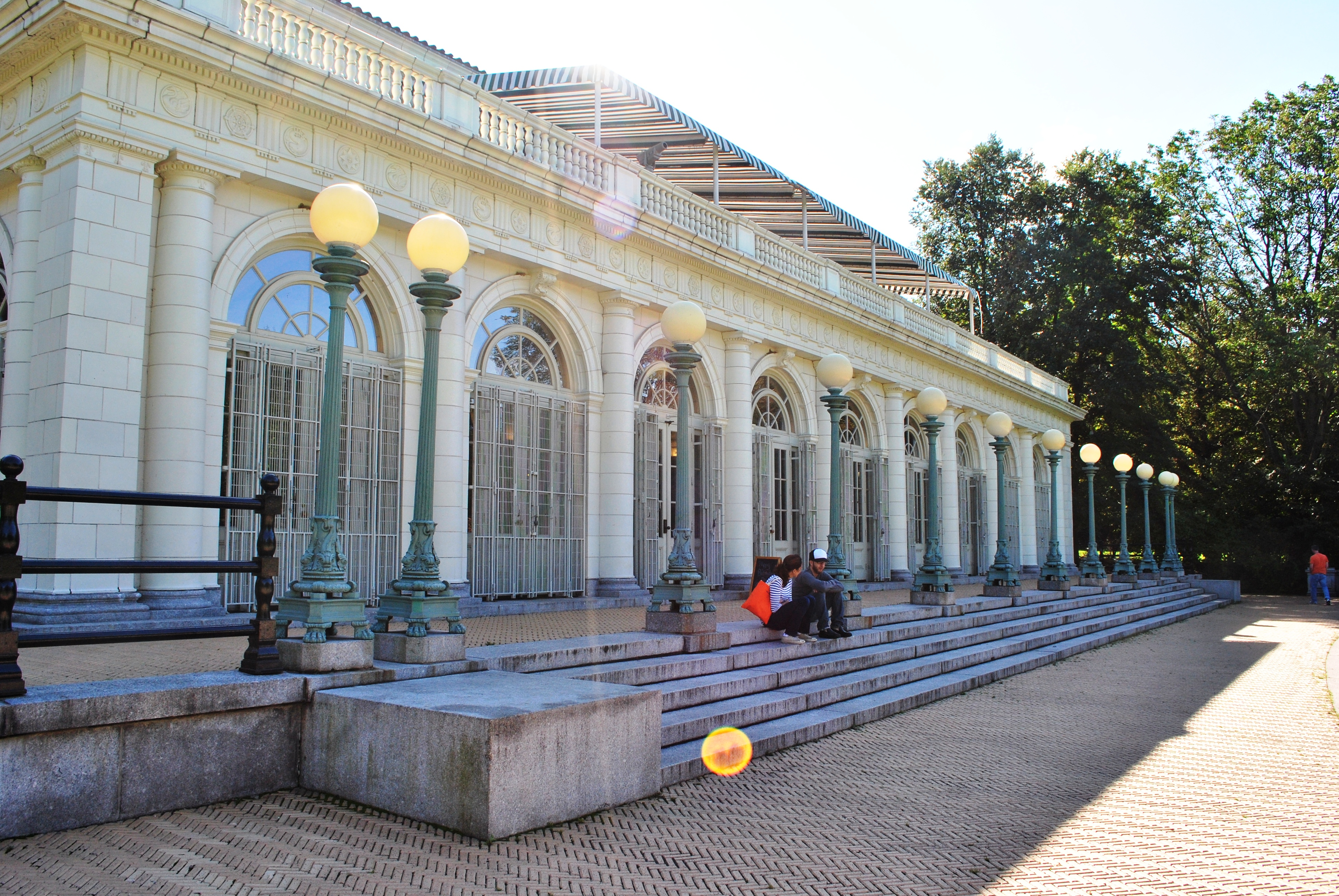
Eastern facade of the Boathouse on the Lullwater

The oldest structure in Prospect Park, the Lefferts Historic House, is located south of the zoo, near the intersection of Ocean Avenue, Flatbush Avenue, and Empire Boulevard. It was built in 1783 and was originally located near the Willink Hill entrance. The structure was relocated in 1920 to make way for the Willink entrance. The house is a New York City designated landmark and operates as a children's museum of Brooklyn family life during the 19th century.

The Prospect Park Carousel is located immediately west of the Lefferts Historic House. The carousel contains 53 horses, created by master horse carver Charles Carmel in 1912, as well as three carvings of other animals and two chariots. The carousel opened in October 1952, superseding another carousel that had burned down over twenty years earlier. It was subsequently restored from 1971 to 1974, and again from 1987 to 1989. Prior to the opening of the current carousel, three separate wooden carousels had been built throughout the park's history, and were located in different parts of the park.

The Willink Hill entrance contains the neoclassical Willink Entrance Comfort Station. The structure opened in 1912 and is designed similarly to the Tennis House.

Further south of the Willink entrance is the Boathouse on the Lullwater, on the Lullwater's eastern shore. Built in 1905–1907, it was the first structure in the park built by McKim, Mead and White, and was also constructed in the neoclassical style. After being saved from destruction in 1964, it was listed on the NRHP in 1972.

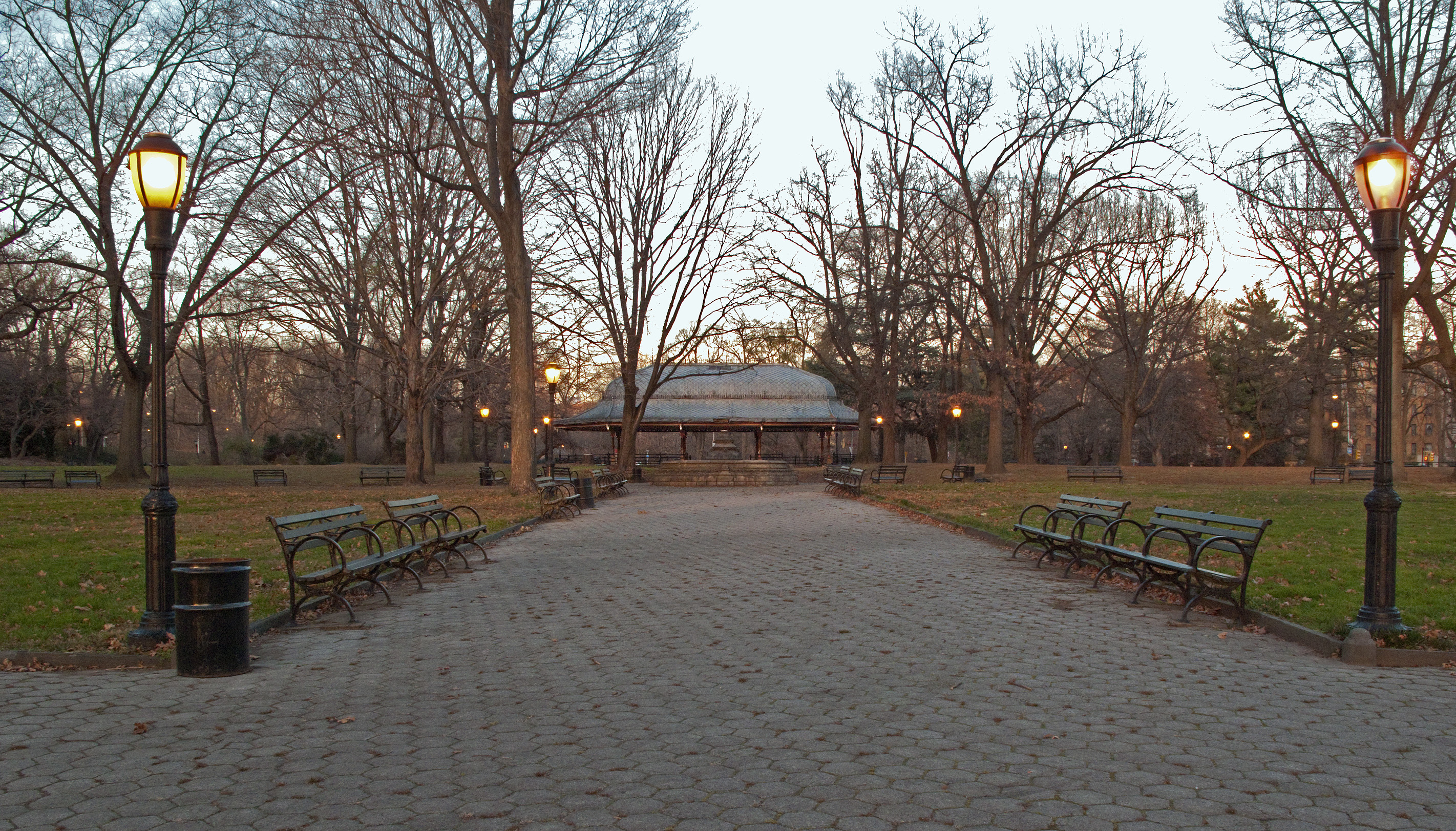
A path leading to the Oriental Pavilion

South of the Boathouse, past the Cleft Ridge Arch, is the Concert Grove, located on the northeast edge of the Lake. Originally built in 1847, it was designed so park patrons could hear music being played on the later-demolished Music Island. The grove's style complements that of the Central Park Mall but was laid out radially. The grove also contains busts of classical composers. A statue of Abraham Lincoln is located at the Concert Grove. In the middle of the grove is the Concert Grove Pavilion, also known as the Oriental Pavilion, measuring 40 by 80 feet (12 by 24 m) with a roof and columns in a Middle Eastern or Indian style; it formerly served as a restaurant but has since fallen into disrepair. In 2021, the Concert Grove Pavilion was restored.

The Samuel J. and Ethel LeFrak Center at Lakeside is located immediately south of the Concert Grove. It was completed in December 2013 and replaces the former Wollman Rink. The multipurpose, year-round facility is used for ice-skating, boating, biking, and roller-skating, as well as winter sports such as hockey and curling. The LeFrak Center accommodates over 200,000 visitors annually.

==== Nethermead and Lookout Hill ====
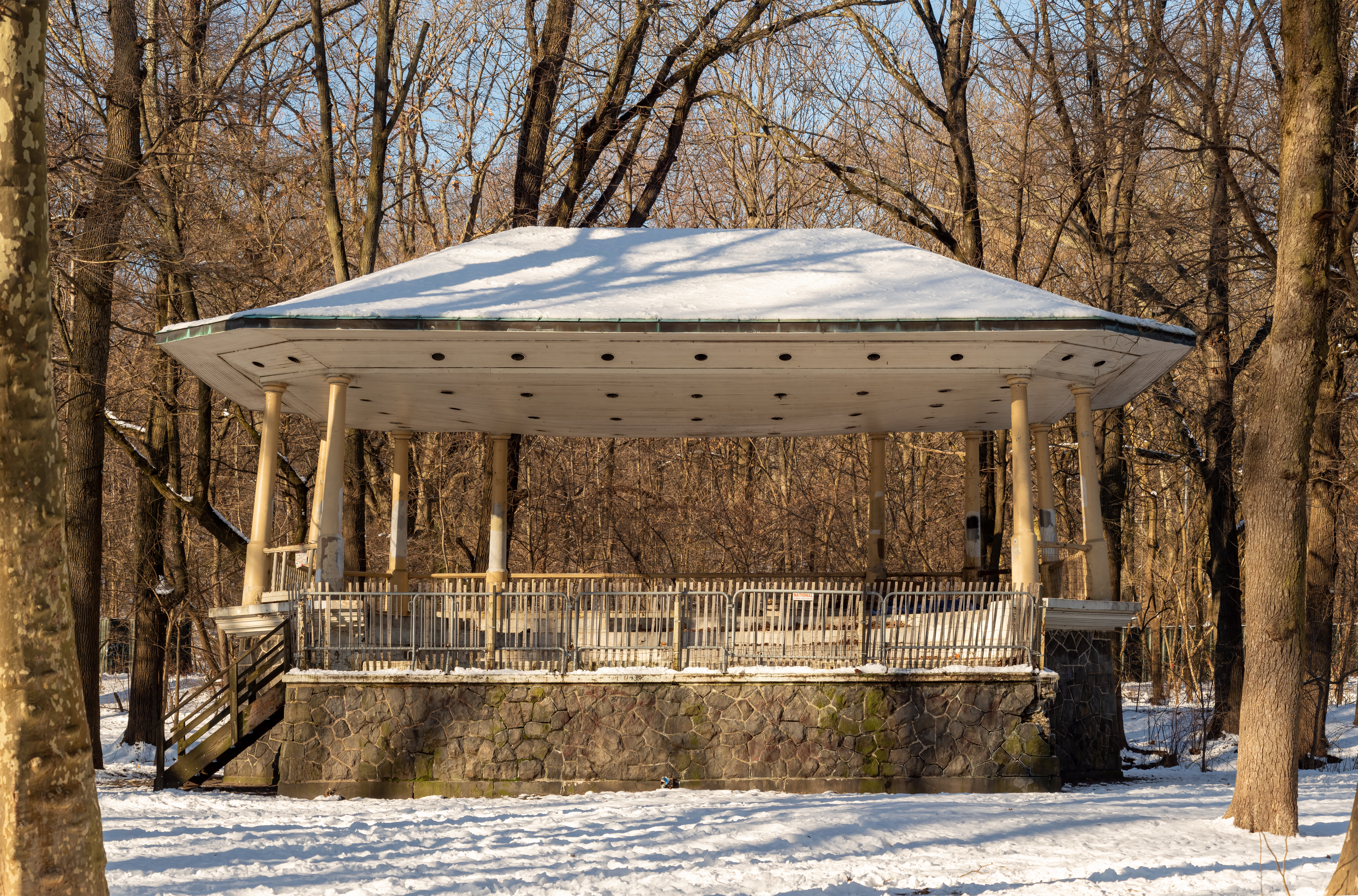
Rebuilt Music Pagoda

The Music Pagoda is located in the Nethermead, on the east side of the park along the watercourse's west shore. The original pagoda, built in 1887, was a wooden structure with an octagonal roof and a stone base. It replaced a "temporary" music stand near the Lullwood. The Music Pagoda was used for concerts until it burned down in 1968. The current pagoda on the site is a re-creation of the original, built in 1971.

The Well House is located on the northern shore of the Lake, abutting the southern slope of Lookout Hill on the southwestern side of Prospect Park. It was the last structure in the park to be built by Olmsted and Vaux, having been built in 1869. It was made of gray stone and brick, and featured a hip roof and a doorway inside a Tudor arch. The house initially contained machinery that powered Prospect Park's watercourse, and at one point, pumped 750,000 U.S. gallons (2,800,000 liters) of water into the watercourse each day. The water from the Well House was drawn from a 70-foot-deep (21 m) well, which led to the Brooklyn Aquifer. Originally, there was a 60-foot-tall (18 m) smokestack behind the Well House, as well as a cistern in front of the building. The machines became obsolete in the early 20th century when Prospect Park was connected to New York City's municipal water system. Subsequently, the tower was demolished and the cistern was filled in. In 2017, the Well House was restored and turned into a composting restroom.

==== South side ====
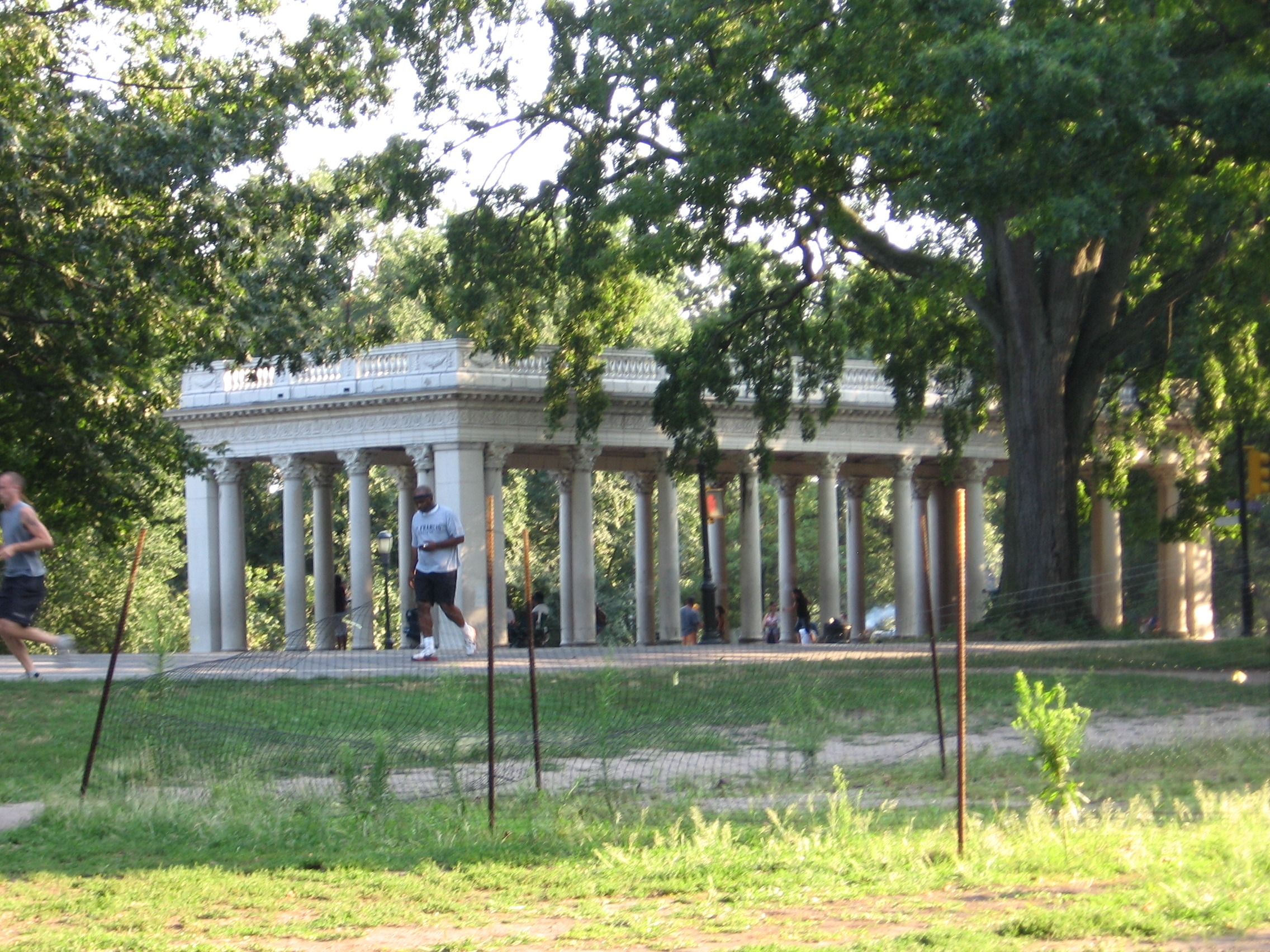
The Peristyle

The Prospect Park Peristyle, also known as the Grecian Shelter or Croquet Shelter, is located on the southwest corner of the park, south of the Lake. Constructed by McKim, Mead and White in 1905, this peristyle was built on the site of the 1860s-era Promenade Drive Shelter. The Prospect Park Peristyle is actually designed in the Renaissance architectural style and consists of a rectangular colonnade with Corinthian columns. It was rehabilitated in 1966 and listed on the NRHP in 1972.

=== Former structures ===
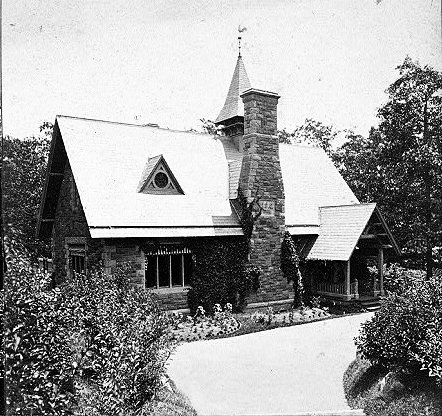
The Dairy, c. 1870

The Dairy Cottage, or "the Dairy", was located near Boulder Bridge west of the zoo. It was a two-story stone cottage with two gabled wings; a public room and women's quarters on the first floor; and a single residence on the second floor. The Dairy was built in 1869 or 1871 to sell fresh milk and other light refreshments to the public; a similar building was also built in Central Park. At the time, sheep and cows were allowed to pasture on the meadows of Prospect Park, and seven cows were purchased specifically to provide milk. However, according to the Brooklyn Daily Eagle, news articles after 1879 do not make a mention of the Dairy providing milk. The cottage later became part of the Menagerie, the precursor to the modern-day zoo, and was encircled by several other zoo buildings to its north and east. All of these buildings were demolished in 1935 when the zoo was built.

There were two unusual structures built in Prospect Park in its early years. The first was a camera obscura booth located on Breeze Hill's western slope, at the east end of the park, built in the early 1880s. The second was the Circular Yacht or Rotary Yacht, a floating carousel with yacht-shaped vehicles. Located near the Long Meadow, the Circular Yacht was constructed by inventor David Smith in 1878 and could hold up to 220 people at once. These structures were both demolished before the 1900s, and the camera obscura later became the site of the now-demolished Old Fashioned Flower Garden.

The park contained a Music Island near the east shore of the Lake. The island was used by musicians who were performing for audiences in the nearby Concert Grove. It was demolished in 1960 to make way for the Wollman Rink. Following the rink's demolition in the early 2010s, a replica of the island was constructed, and it opened in 2012. Across the Lake, two structures were built on the peninsula in the late 19th and early 20th centuries. The Model Yacht Club House, built on the south side of the peninsula in 1900, was an octagonal wood-frame clubhouse that burned down in a fire in 1956. On the opposite or northern side of the peninsula, there was another shelter, similar in design to the Concert Grove Pavilion, which lasted from 1915 to around the 1940s.

On the west side of Prospect Park, there was a conservatory on the Long Meadow. It consisted of sixteen greenhouses located near Seventh Street and Prospect Park West. Though it was a popular visitor attraction, it was supplanted by the Brooklyn Botanic Garden past the park's eastern edge. The conservatory's greenhouses were renovated in 1929–1930, but the cost of upkeep soon became exorbitant. In 1955, the greenhouses were considered redundant and were demolished. At that point, the conservatory's main attraction was an annual Easter flower show.

== Recreation ==
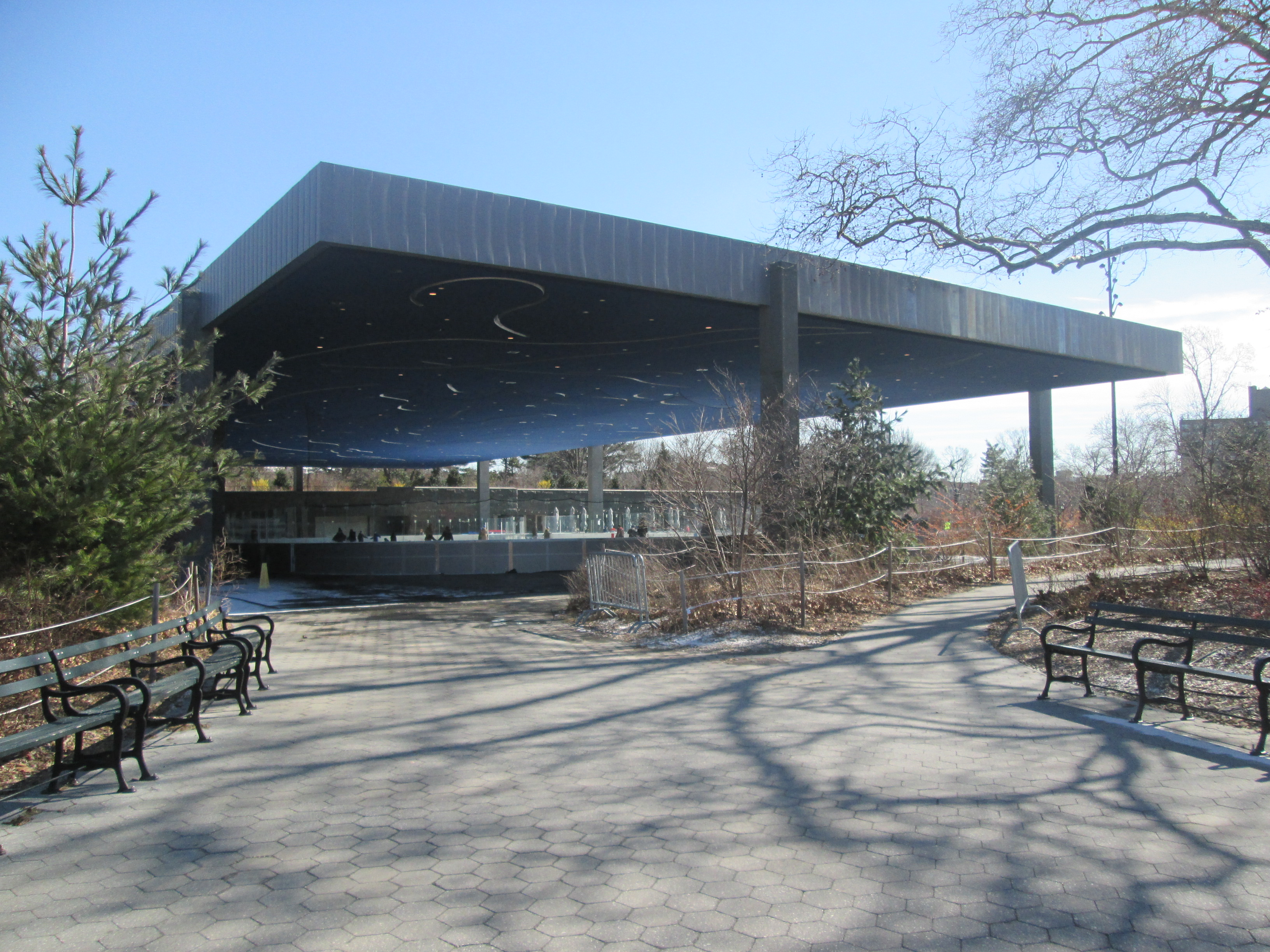
LeFrak Center at Lakeside

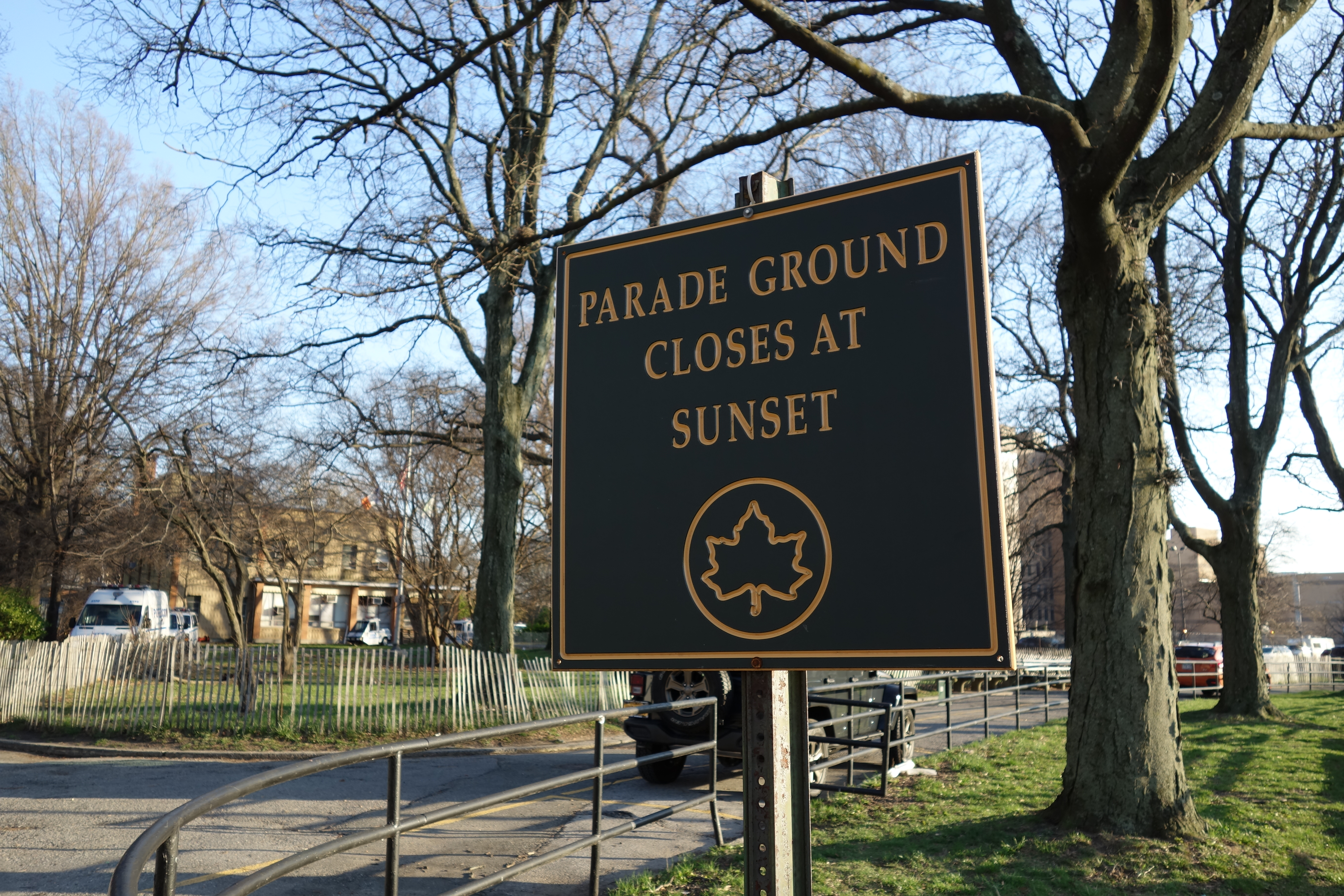
Entrance to the Parade Ground

There are numerous sports hosted in Prospect Park, and specialized facilities exist for several sports. Seven baseball fields are located in the Long Meadow between 9th and 15th Streets. Two are major league-sized fields serving older age groups, while the other five are slightly smaller and intended for younger children, typically 8–12 years old. In the winter, ice skating, cross-country skiing, figure skating, curling, hockey, and tennis are provided in the LeFrak Center at Lakeside. The LeFrak Center also accommodates boating and biking. The Parade Ground also contains a variety of fields for several sports.

Runners also use the trails and drives of Prospect Park. The pedestrian lanes of East Drive and West Drive form an 3.36-mile-long (5.41 km) paved loop. The Prospect Park Track Club, formed in 1970, organizes regular training runs and races in and around the park. Reporting over 2,000 members, Prospect Park Track Club records itself as one of the largest running clubs in Brooklyn as of 2023. Organizations including NYCRUNS and the New York Road Runners also host road running races in the park. This includes the New York City Half Marathon which, since 2018, has been run from Prospect Park to Central Park. NYCRUNS's Brooklyn Marathon was first hosted in 2011, with a course that initially consisted of eight laps around Prospect Park; in 2022, the marathon adopted a new course that crossed Brooklyn and passed through the park.

Other sports are also played in Prospect Park. The Prospect Park Women's Softball League has been playing softball games on summer evenings in Prospect Park since 1973. Circle rules football is also played seasonally inside the park. Since the 1930s, the nearby Kensington Stables has hosted horse-riding lessons in Prospect Park. Pedalboating is also open to the public on the lake. Prospect Park's rolling hills also accommodate sledding during the winters.

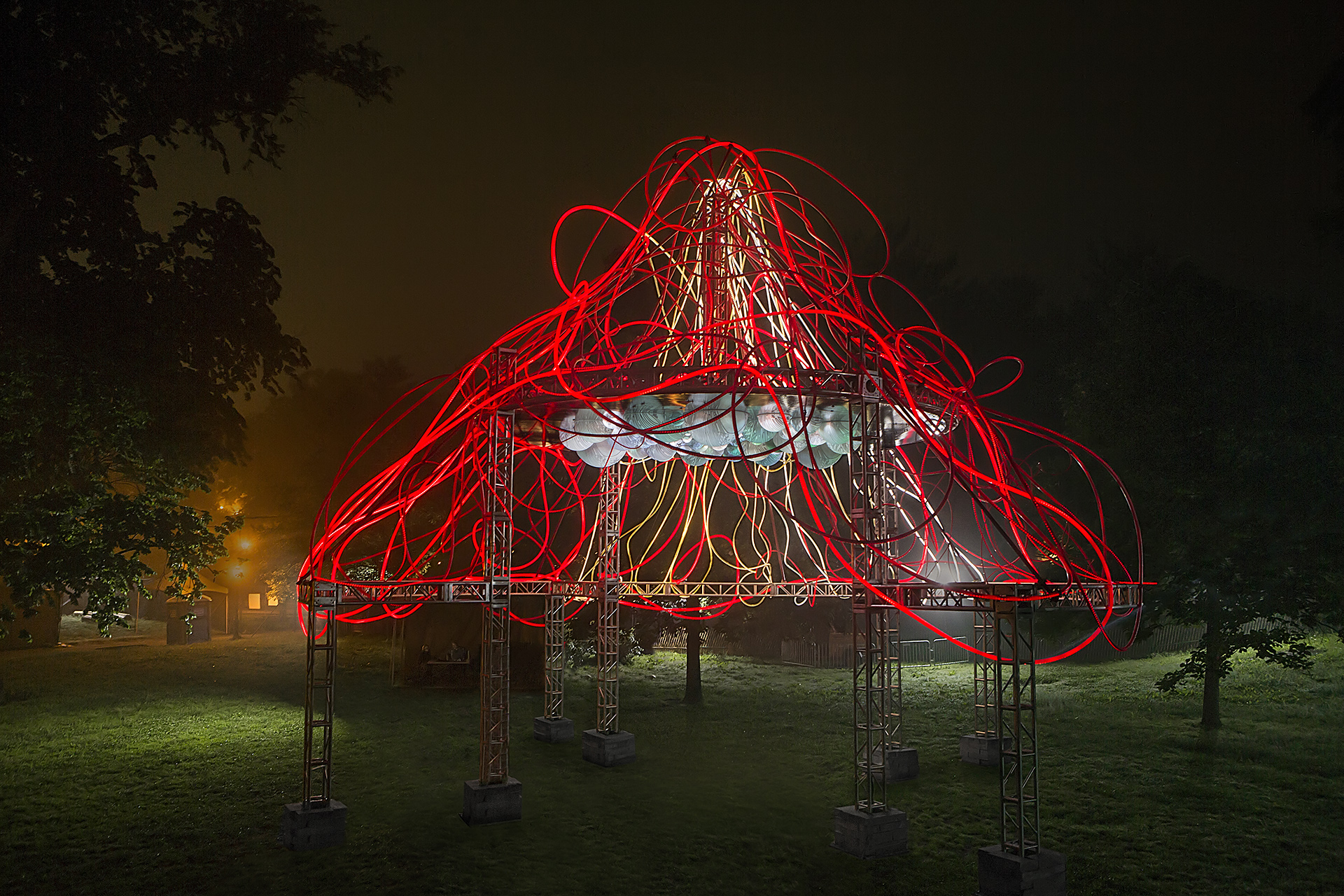
Prospect Park Bandshell, featuring a light installation by Grimanesa Amorós.

The Bandshell hosts frequent concerts, most notably the "Celebrate Brooklyn!" Performing Arts Festival, a series of summer concerts founded in 1979 that draws performing artists from around the world. The festival is produced by BRIC Arts Media Bklyn.

=== Parade Ground ===
The site of the present-day Parade Ground, at Prospect Park's southwest corner, was first proposed in 1866 and was to be used for training militia. The state approved the acquisition of a 40-acre (16 ha) rectangular area just south of Parkside Avenue and handed control of the plot to the Prospect Park commissioners. The Parade Ground was designated to be used for sports and military drills. It was set apart from the main section of the park in fear that the high level of activity would damage the grass and plants and disrupt the park's pastoral feel. Initially, the Parade Ground contained a long, wood-frame building, which included a two-story pavilion for officers' quarters, as well as a restroom to the south and a guard room to the north. Other uses included a gathering on June 15, 1927, when the Parade Ground attracted over 200,000 people to greet pioneering aviator Charles Lindbergh.

The militia no longer use the Parade Ground, but the plot is still an active athletic complex. In its present form, the Parade Ground has fifteen numbered courts and fields, used for soccer, baseball, softball, basketball, and volleyball. They encompass the Prospect Park Tennis Center, four baseball diamonds, two softball fields, a football field, a soccer field, basketball and volleyball courts, the Paul Ricard Pétanque Court and three giant multi-use fields. The Stewart Playground is also on the east side of the Parade Ground.

Many Major League Baseball stars got their start at the Parade Ground, including Joe Torre and Sandy Koufax. In 2003, the Parade Ground had a netball court installed next to the basketball courts. The next year, the Parade Ground underwent a $12.4 million restoration. The netball court was replaced by an outdoor adult fitness center in 2019, due to a lack of use, and a dog run in the Parade Ground opened in 2020.

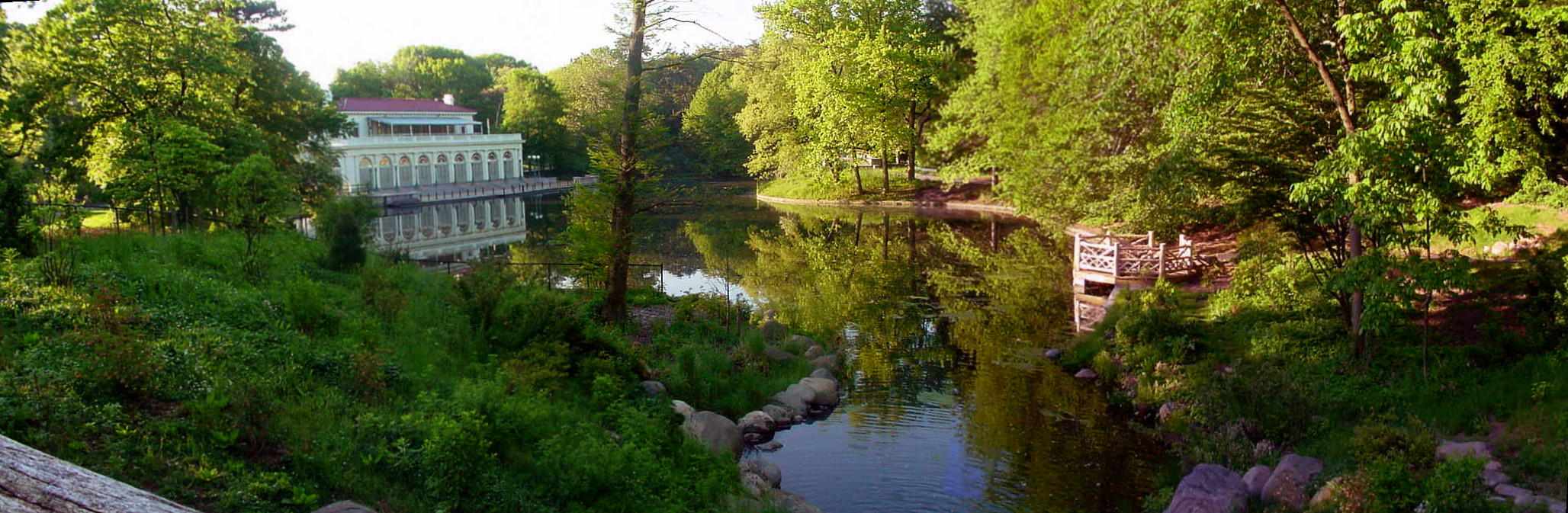
Boathouse at the Lullwater

== Management ==
A nonprofit organization called Prospect Park Alliance manages Prospect Park, while NYC Parks owns and operates the land and facilities. The Alliance's responsibilities include maintaining and restoring natural and recreational areas, as well as providing educational and cultural programs. In the fiscal year ending June 30, 2022, the Alliance had net assets (own equity) of about $37.2 million and liabilities of $3.1 million, which amounted to total assets of $40.3 million. Net assets increased $5.9 million from the fiscal year ending June 30, 2021.

Prior to the Prospect Park Alliance's founding, there was no private maintenance of the park. The Alliance was created in April 1987 after the city had spent $10 million in federal funds to renovate the park in the early 1980s. The Alliance subsequently started new programs to reach out to the surrounding communities, and its renovation programs caused housing prices in the area to increase by the 1990s.

== Transportation ==
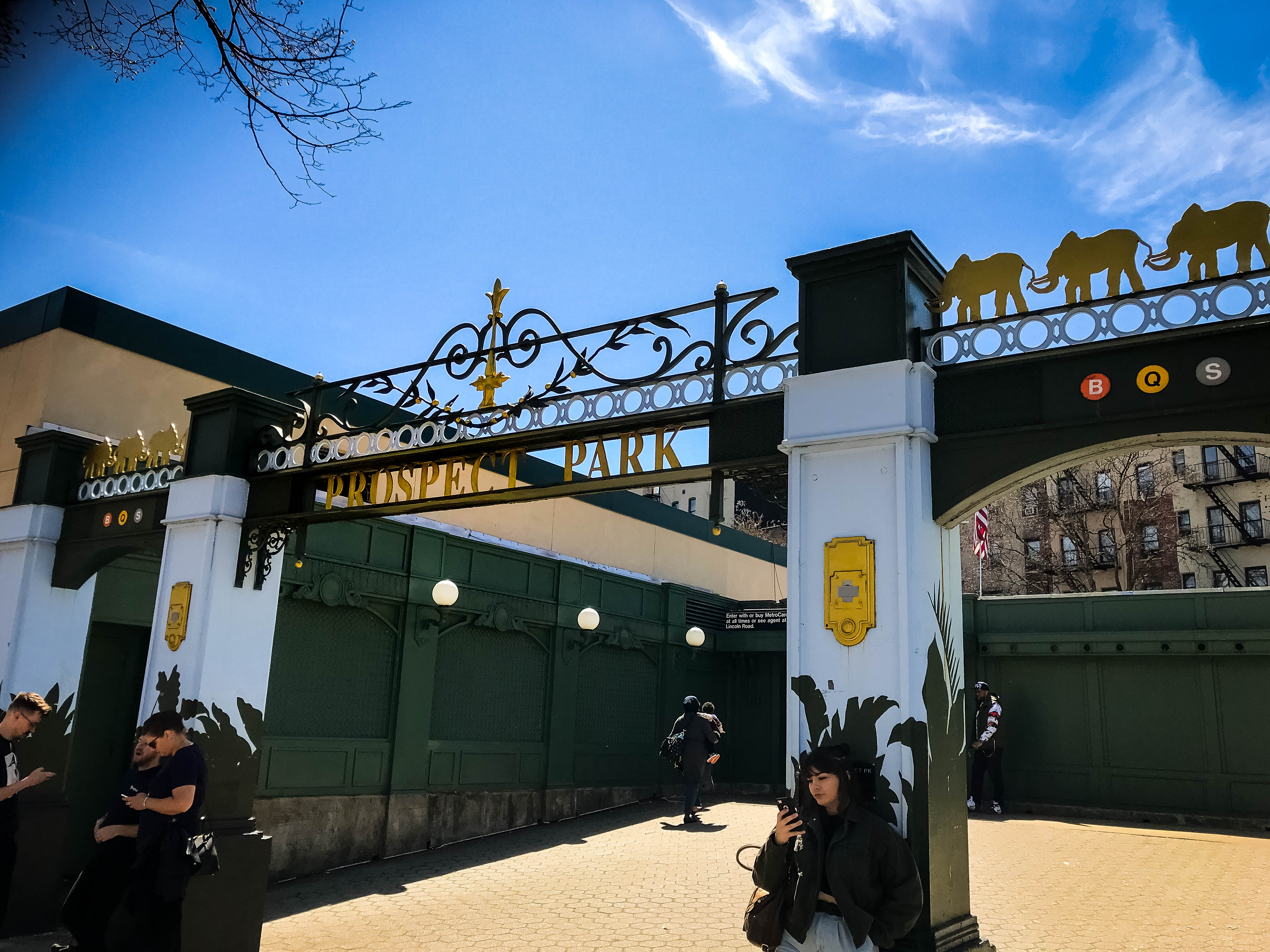
Entrance to the Prospect Park station

There are four New York City Subway stations that directly serve the park. The eastern side of Prospect Park is served by the park's eponymous station (B, Q, and S trains) and the Parkside Avenue station (Q train). The western side is served by 15th Street–Prospect Park (F, <F>, and G trains). Grand Army Plaza is served by the 2 and 3 trains at the plaza's eponymous station. Bus service is provided on the western side by the B61, B67 and B69 buses, the southwestern side by the B68 bus; the eastern side by the B16, B41, B43 and B48 buses; and the southern side by the B16 bus.

== Incidents ==
=== Animals ===
During the 1970s, there were multiple incidents involving animal injuries or deaths at the Prospect Park Zoo. This included the scalding death of a monkey in 1975, allegedly by a zoo employee, as well as an acting zoo director who was accused of shooting at pigeons and killing zoo animals. A zoo employee also locked himself in a monkey enclosure for several hours in 1974 to protest the deaths of ten animals. These incidents, as well as several others at the Central Park Zoo, prompted protests by animal-rights groups who wanted to close the two zoos and move the animals to the larger Bronx Zoo. This directly led to the Wildlife Conservation Society's takeover of the Prospect Park Zoo in 1980.

In May 1987, an 11-year-old boy climbed into the polar bear enclosure after hours at the Prospect Park Zoo and was subsequently mauled by two of the bears; both bears were then fatally shot by police officers. The incident contributed to the Wildlife Conservation Society's decision to redesign the zoo to emphasize species more appropriate to its small size and to visitor interactions.

In July 2010, federal authorities captured 400 Canada geese in the park and gassed them to death due to air safety concerns brought up after the emergency landing of US Airways Flight 1549 in January 2009.

=== Crimes and deaths ===
Several murders have occurred in Prospect Park during its history. In August 1975, a 15-year-old recent graduate of Ditmas Junior High School, was strangled with a belt in a wooded area of the Vale of Cashmere. In June 1993, a 42-year-old man was shot to death while resisting a group of teenagers trying to steal his bicycle; the shooter received a maximum 25-year prison term. In April 2006, a 61-year-old man was found stabbed to death in the Vale of Cashmere. A 41-year-old homeless man was found beaten to death in a wooded area near a jogging path two years later, in June 2008. A 23-year-old man was fatally shot at the Parade Ground in March 2011, having recently been jailed on charges of being an accomplice in another man's murder.

Other incidents have included the April 2018 suicide of lawyer and environmental activist David Buckel, who lit himself on fire to protest the use of fossil fuels.

== See also ==
- List of New York City scenic landmarks
- List of New York City Designated Landmarks in Brooklyn
- List of parks in New York City
- National Register of Historic Places listings in Brooklyn
