= List of sculptures of Ludwig van Beethoven =

External image
- Anton Dietrich's Bust, on the Google Arts & Culture website

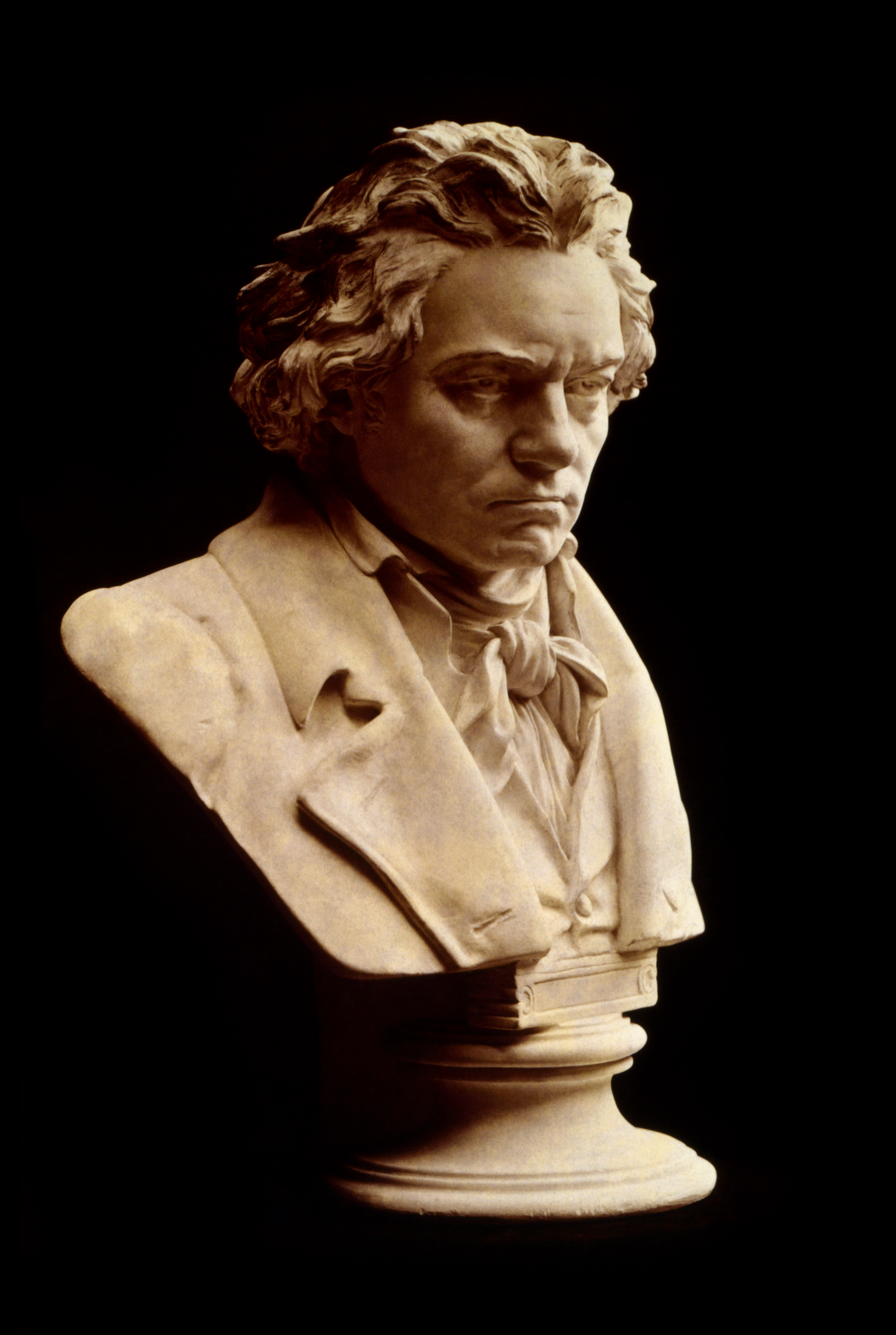
Bust of Beethoven by Hugo Hagen, 1892, Library of Congress, Washington, D.C.

The German composer Ludwig van Beethoven (1770–1827) is among the most admired composers in the history of Western music, and has been the subject of many private and public sculptures, including busts, reliefs, statues and others. The first, a bust by Franz Klein, was commissioned by Johann Andreas Streicher and created in 1812, while the composer was still alive. After Beethoven's death in 1827, his hometown, Bonn, immediately began planning a monument for the following year, though a cholera outbreak delayed this. A design competition was eventually held, in which a submission by Ernst Julius Hähnel beat ones from Friedrich von Amerling, Gustav Blaeser and Friedrich Drake. In 1845, Hähnel's monument was erected, due to finances given by Robert Schumann, Charles Hallé, George Thomas Smart and especially Franz Liszt. While the monument's height and simplicity were criticized, the reliefs surrounding the base were met with public approval. The statue's representation of a figure standing on a decorated base with its legs slightly apart was popular at the time, and later inspired Theodore Baur's statue of c. 1895 in the Library of Congress.

The Beethoven monuments that followed Hähnel's, while retaining a high pedestal, began to portray the composer in a less simplistic and increasingly heroic light. The most significant representative of this, and the most famous Beethoven monument from the second half of the 19th century, was Kaspar von Zumbusch's 1880 monument in Beethovenplatz, Vienna. The city had intended to erect a monument for Beethoven since his death, but serious action to do so began only in the 1870s, when a competition for a design was held and Zumbusch's winning design was created with financial support from Liszt and Brahms.

In the early 20th century, the glorified portrayals of Beethoven reached their peak, with god-like representations such as Max Klinger's monument (1902), unveiled at the Vienna Secession (now in the Museum der bildenden Künste), and Fidus's unexecuted design for a 'Beethoven temple' (1903). The 20th century also saw a brief return to the simplistic style of the 19th century, such as Robert Weigl's statue at the Heiligenstädter Park in Vienna (1910) and Hugo Uher's statue in Karlsbad (1929). Also at this time, Antoine Bourdelle and Naoum Aronson, both students of Auguste Rodin, began creating busts of the composer; Bourdelle was especially prolific. As the century progressed, ideas on depicting Beethoven became largely ununified, and were often especially allegorical, such as Theodor von Gosen's monument in Alameda Central, Mexico City (1921). In 1926, Berlin hosted a monument competition in preparation for the composer's 100th anniversary the following year; the entire competition was controversial and was eventually canceled due to criticism from the press and the committee's inability to form a consensus. There had been submissions from famous sculptors including Ernst Barlach, Peter Breuer and Georg Kolbe, although Breuer and Kolbe eventually had their designs constructed in 1938 and 1948 respectively. After World War II, experimentation in portraying Beethoven increased even further, exemplified by Klaus Kammerichs's three-dimensional reproduction (1986) of Joseph Karl Stieler's painted portrait and Markus Lüpertz's controversial abstract portrayal (2014).

There is a large collection of busts in the Beethoven House, a museum and cultural institution based in Bonn that studies Beethoven's life and legacy, including ones by an unknown artist based on a sculpture by Josef Danhauser (c. 1890); Fernando Cian (first quarter of the 20th century); Pierre Félix Masseau (1902); Aronson (1905); a mask supposedly by Wilhelm Hüsgen (1920–1927); Eduard Merz (1945/46); Lewon Konstantinowitsch Lasarew (1981); and Cantemir Riscutia (1998).

== Sculptures ==
Sculptures of Ludwig van Beethoven
Image	Type	Location	Date (Note: For public monuments the approximate date the work was unveiled is given if available; for other works the approximate time of creation is given.)	Sculptor	Ref(s)
	Bust	Kunsthistorisches Museum; Vienna, Austria	1812	Franz Klein	
	Bust	La Scala; Milan, Italy	First half of the 19th century	Anton Dietrich	
	Statue	Münsterplatz; Bonn, Germany	12 August 1845	Ernst Julius Hähnel	
	Relief	Liceu; Barcelona, Spain	March 1847	Agapit Vallmitjana i Barbany	
External image: Dorcière's relief, on the Statues – Hither & Thither website	Relief	Conservatoire de Musique de Genève; Geneva, Switzerland	1856–58	Louis Dorcière	
	Bust	Beethovengang, Heiligenstadt; Vienna, Austria	15/23 June 1863	Anton Dominik Fernkorn	
	Bust	Walhalla; Donaustauf, Germany	1866	Arnold Hermann Lossow after Anton Dietrich	
External image: Schaller's bust, on the Royal Society of Musicians of Great Britain's website	Bust	Royal Philharmonic Society; London, United Kingdom	1871	Johann Nepomuk Schaller	
	Relief	Frieze of Parnassus; Albert Memorial; London, United Kingdom	1872	Henry Hugh Armstead	
	Statue	Royal Museum of Fine Arts; Antwerp, Belgium	1874	Jacques de Braekeleer	
	Other sculpture	Galleria d'Arte Moderna; Milan, Italy	1874	Giuseppe Grandi	
External image: Giuseppe Grandi's sculpture, on the Google Arts & Culture website	Other sculpture	Galleria Civica d'Arte Moderna e Contemporanea; Turin, Italy	1874	Giuseppe Grandi	
External image: Bust by Bertheauld, on the Statues – Hither & Thither website	Bust	Grand Théâtre de Genève; Geneva, Switzerland	1879	Bertheauld?	
	Statue	Beethovenplatz; Vienna, Austria	1 May 1880	Kaspar von Zumbusch	
External image: Relief on the Alte Oper, on the Statues – Hither & Thither website	Relief	Alte Oper; Frankfurt, Germany	1880	Unknown	
	Bust	Central Park; New York, New York, US (United States)	22 July 1884	Henry Baerer	
External image: Ferdinand Freiherr von Miller's bust, on the Tower Grove Park website	Bust	Tower Grove Park; St. Louis, Missouri, US (United States)	1884	Ferdinand Freiherr von Miller	
External image: Johannes French's bust, on the Statues – Hither & Thither website	Bust	Concertgebouw; Amsterdam, Netherlands	1888	Johannes French	
	Bust	Beethoven House; Bonn, Germany	c. 1890	Unknown (based on a sculpture by Josef Danhauser)	
	Bust	Library of Congress; Washington, D.C., US (United States)	1892	Hugo Hagen	
	Bust	Prospect Park; New York, New York, US (United States)	20 October 1894	Henry Baerer	
	Statue	Naples, Italy	1895	Francesco Jerace	
	Statue	Library of Congress; Washington, D.C., US (United States)	c. 1895	Theodore Baur	
	Bust	? (Note: The bust was stolen in 1970; only fragments remain.); Last seen in Lincoln Park; Chicago, Illinois, US (United States)	1897	Johannes Gelert	
	Relief	Helenental; Baden bei Wien, Austria	1899	Josef Valentin Kassin	
External image: Thomas Crawford's statue, on the Digital Commonwealth Massachusetts Collections Online	Statue	New England Conservatory of Music; Boston, Massachusetts, US (United States)	1900	Thomas Crawford	
	Bust	Garden of the Beethoven House; Bonn, Germany	First quarter of the 20th century	Fernando Cian (Note: The portrait bust is based on a sculpture by Fernando Cian and is presumed to have been executed by Cian himself.)	
	Bust	Garden of the Beethoven House; Bonn, Germany	1902	Pierre Félix Masseau	
	Statue	Museum der bildenden Künste; Leipzig, Germany	1902	Max Klinger	
External image: Sculpture by an unknown artist, on the Statues – Hither & Thither website	Relief (architectural)	Burschenschaftsdenkmal; Eisenach, Germany	1902	Unknown	
	Other sculpture	Museum of Fine Arts; Boston, Massachusetts, US (United States)	After 1902	Max Klinger	
	Other sculpture	Tiergarten; Berlin, Germany	1904	Rudolf and Wolfgang Siemering	
	Bust	Garden of the Beethoven House; Bonn, Germany	1905	Naoum Aronson	
	Other sculpture	Museum der bildenden Künste; Leipzig, Germany	1907	Max Klinger	
	Statue	Aston Webb Building, University of Birmingham; Birmingham, United Kingdom	1907	Henry Alfred Pegram	
	Bust	Garnethill; Glasgow, Scotland	1909	James Alexander Ewing	
	Statue	Heiligenstädter Park; Döbling, Vienna, Austria	1910	Robert Weigl	
	Bust	Golden Gate Park; San Francisco, California, US (United States)	6 August 1915	Henry Baerer	
	Bust	Parque de la Independencia; Rosario, Argentina	1917	Erminio Blotta	
	Mask	Garden of the Beethoven House; Bonn, Germany	1920–1927	Wilhelm Hüsgen? (Note: Wilhelm Hüsgen is the presumed creator of the mask.)	
	Statue	Alameda Central; Mexico City, Mexico	1921	Theodor von Gosen	
	Relief	Ungargasse 5 Vienna, Austria	7 May 1924	Anton Grath	
	Relief	Malá Strana; Prague, Czech Republic	March 1927	Otakar Španiel	
	Bust	Sauerhof; Baden bei Wien, Austria	10 May 1927	Hans Mauer	
	Bust	Martonvásár, Hungary	1927	Jànos Pàsztor	
	Statue	Nuremberg, Germany	1927	Konrad Roth	
	Statue	Monument to Ludwig van Beethoven; Karlovy Vary, Czech Republic	29 September 1929	Hugo Uher	
	Statue	Budapest, Hungary	1932	János Horvay	
	Statue	Pershing Square; Los Angeles, California, US (United States)	14 October 1932 (Note: Installed to honor William Andrews Clark Jr., founder of the Los Angeles Philharmonic)	Unknown	
	Relief	Rostock, Germany	1934	Paul Wallat	
	Statue	Alter Zoll; Bonn, Germany	1938	Peter Breuer	
	Other sculpture	Plaza Lavalle; Buenos Aires, Argentina	15 November 1944	José Fioravanti	
	Bust	Garden of the Beethoven House; Bonn, Germany	1945/46	Eduard Merz	
	Statue(s)	Frankfurt, Germany	1948	Georg Kolbe	
	Bust	Redoute, Bad Godesberg; Bonn, Germany	1955	Franz Rotter	
	Other sculpture	Doblhoff Park; Baden bei Wien, Austria	1969	Matija Vuković	
	Bust	Graz Opera; Graz, Austria	1969	Fred Pirker	
	Relief	Hegyvidék (District XII); Budapest, Hungary	1970	László Csontos	
	Other sculpture	Hlohovec, Slovakia	c. 1970	Unknown	
	Statue	Jan Kochanowski Park; Bydgoszcz, Poland	1970s	Witold Marciniak	
	Statue	Siolim; Goa, India	1 May 1976	Cypriano Fernandes	
	Bust	Parque de Berlín; Madrid, Spain	1981	Unknown	
	Bust	Garden of the Beethoven House; Bonn, Germany	1981	Levon Lazarev	
	Other sculpture	Beethovenhalle; Bonn, Germany	1986	Klaus Kammerichs after Joseph Karl Stieler	
External image: Kuschel's statue, on the Naruto, Tokushima website	Statue	Naruto, Tokushima, Japan	1997	Peter Kuschel	
	Bust	Garden of the Beethoven House; Bonn, Germany	1998	Cantemir Riscutia	
	Statue	Jesús de Monasterio Park; Santander, Spain	1999	Ramón Ruiz Lloreda	
External image: Yuan Xikun's bust, on the Google Arts & Culture website	Bust	Jintai Art Museum; Beijing, China	2004	Yuan Xikun	
External image: Burkhard Mohr's bust, on the Statues – Hither & Thither website	Bust	Bad Godesberg; Bonn, Germany	before 2008	Burkhard Mohr	
	Other sculpture	Stadtgarten; Bonn, Germany	30 March 2014	Markus Lüpertz	
	Statue(s)	Martonvásár, Hungary	31 December 2014	Nagy János	

=== Bourdelle's sculptures ===
The French sculptor Antoine Bourdelle (1861–1929) greatly admired Beethoven, of whom he created at least 45 sculptures from 1893 to the end of his life. (Note: So as not to overwhelm the list with sculptures by Bourdelle, the sculptures have been put in a separate section and limited.)

Sculptures by Antoine Bourdelle
Image	Type	Location	Date	Ref(s)
External image: Antoine Bourdelle's study, on the Smithsonian Institution website	Bust (a study)	Hirshhorn Museum and Sculpture Garden; Washington, D.C., US (United States)	1889	
	Bust	Cleveland Museum of Art; Cleveland, Ohio, US (United States)	1891	
	Bust	Musée Ingres; Montauban, France	1891	
External image: Antoine Bourdelle's mask, on the List Visual Arts Center website	Mask	List Visual Arts Center; Cambridge, Massachusetts, US (United States)	1901	
	Bust	Musée Ingres; Montauban, France	1901–1902	
	Bust	Beethovenhalle; Bonn, Germany	1902	
External image: Antoine Bourdelle's bust, on Google Arts & Culture	Bust	Beethoven House; Bonn, Germany	1902	
	Bust	Strasbourg Museum of Modern and Contemporary Art; Strasbourg, France	1903	
	Bust	Musée d'Orsay; Paris, France	1903	
External image: Antoine Bourdelle's statue, on the Courtauld Institute of Art's website	Statue	Musée Bourdelle; Paris, France	1904–1908	
External image: Antoine Bourdelle's bust, on the Metropolitan Museum of Art's website	Bust	Metropolitan Museum of Art; New York, New York, US (United States)	c. 1926 [1902]	
External image: Antoine Bourdelle's statue, on a website dedicated to Beethoven	Bust	Montevideo, Uruguay	25 December 1927	
	Other sculpture	Musée Ingres; Montauban, France	1927–1928	
External image: Antoine Bourdelle's statue, on the Princeton University Art Museum website	Statue	Princeton University Art Museum; Princeton, New Jersey, US (United States)	1929	
	Bust	Jardin du Luxembourg; Paris, France	1978 [1902]	
External image: Antoine Bourdelle's bust, on the Ohara Museum of Art website	Bust	Ohara Museum of Art; Kurashiki, Japan	Undated	

== Unexecuted sculptures ==
Unexecuted sculptures
Sketch	Date	Sculptor	Ref(s)
	c. 1840	Gustav Blaeser	
	1840s	Friedrich von Amerling	
	c. 1840–1845	Friedrich Drake	
	c. 1890	Emil Eugen Sachse	
	1903	Fidus	
	1926	Ernst Barlach	

== See also ==
- Beethoven Frieze – 1901 painting by Gustav Klimt
- Beethoven (Mähler) – Two portraits of Beethoven by Joseph Willibrord Mähler
