= Statue of Gouverneur K. Warren =

Statue in Brooklyn, New York, U.S.

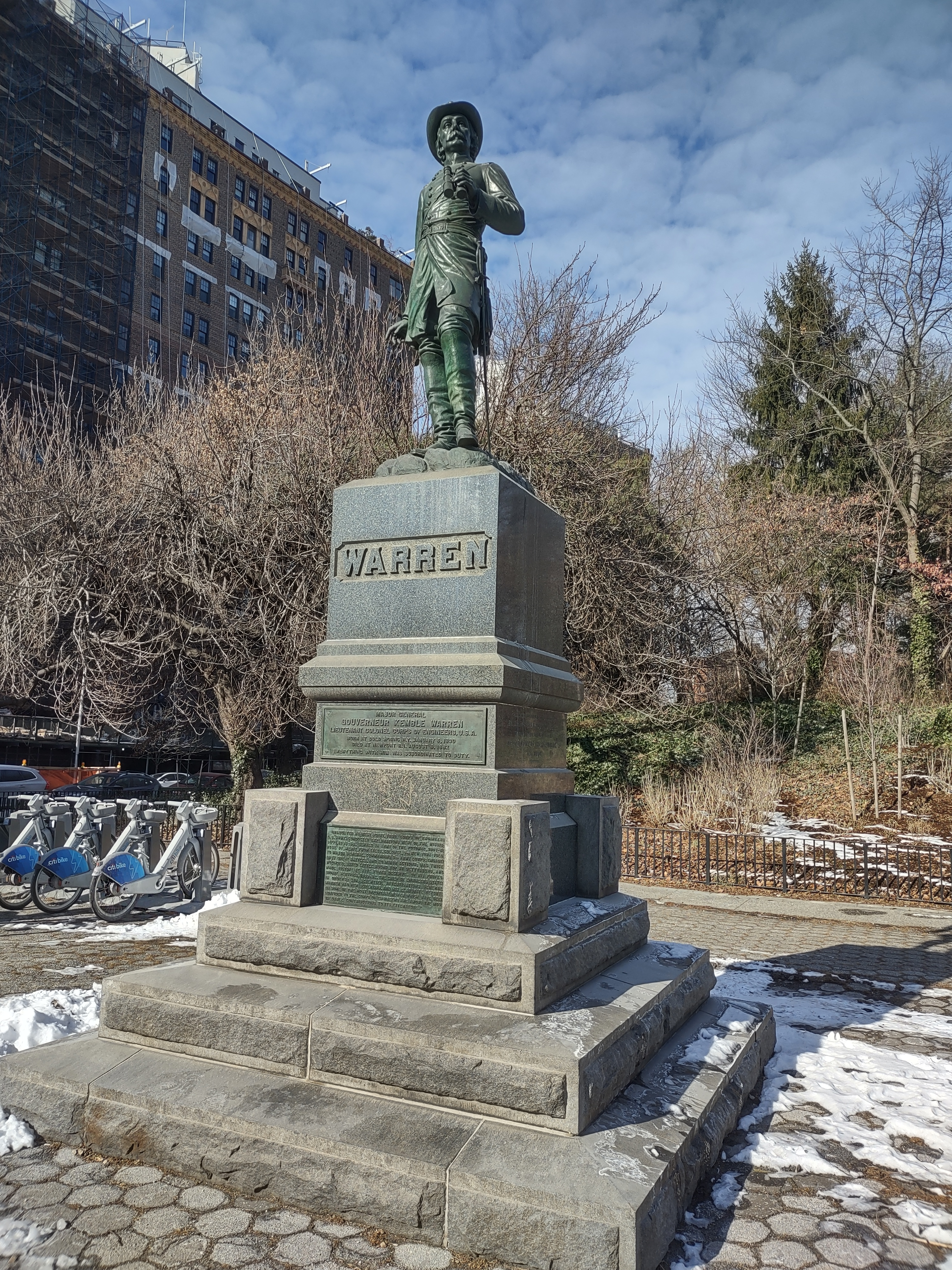
- The statue in 2025
- Artist: Henry Baerer
- Medium: Bronze; granite
- Subject: Gouverneur K. Warren
- Location: New York City, New York, U.S.; 40.673015°N 73.97065°W

A statue of Gouverneur K. Warren by artist Henry Baerer is installed in Brooklyn's Grand Army Plaza, in the U.S. state of New York. The bronze sculpture of Warren in military garb rests on a Conway green granite pedestal quarried from Little Round Top. It was cast in 1893, commissioned by the G.K. Warren Post, No. 286, G.A.R. for $10,000, and dedicated on June 26, 1896. The memorial was cleaned in 1938, and conserved in 2001.

There is another bronze statue of Warren on Little Round Top.
