= Ludwig van Beethoven (Baerer) =

Sculptures series by Henry Baerer

- Artist: Henry Baerer
- Type: Sculpture
- Subject: Ludwig van Beethoven
- Location: New York City; San Francisco

Ludwig van Beethoven is a series of sculptures of Ludwig van Beethoven by German-American sculptor Henry Baerer. Versions are displayed in Central Park and Prospect Park in New York City, as well as Golden Gate Park in San Francisco. The sculpture in Central Park was dedicated on July 22, 1884. It includes two bronze statues, including a bust of Beethoven and an allegorical female figure on a polished Barre Granite pedestal.

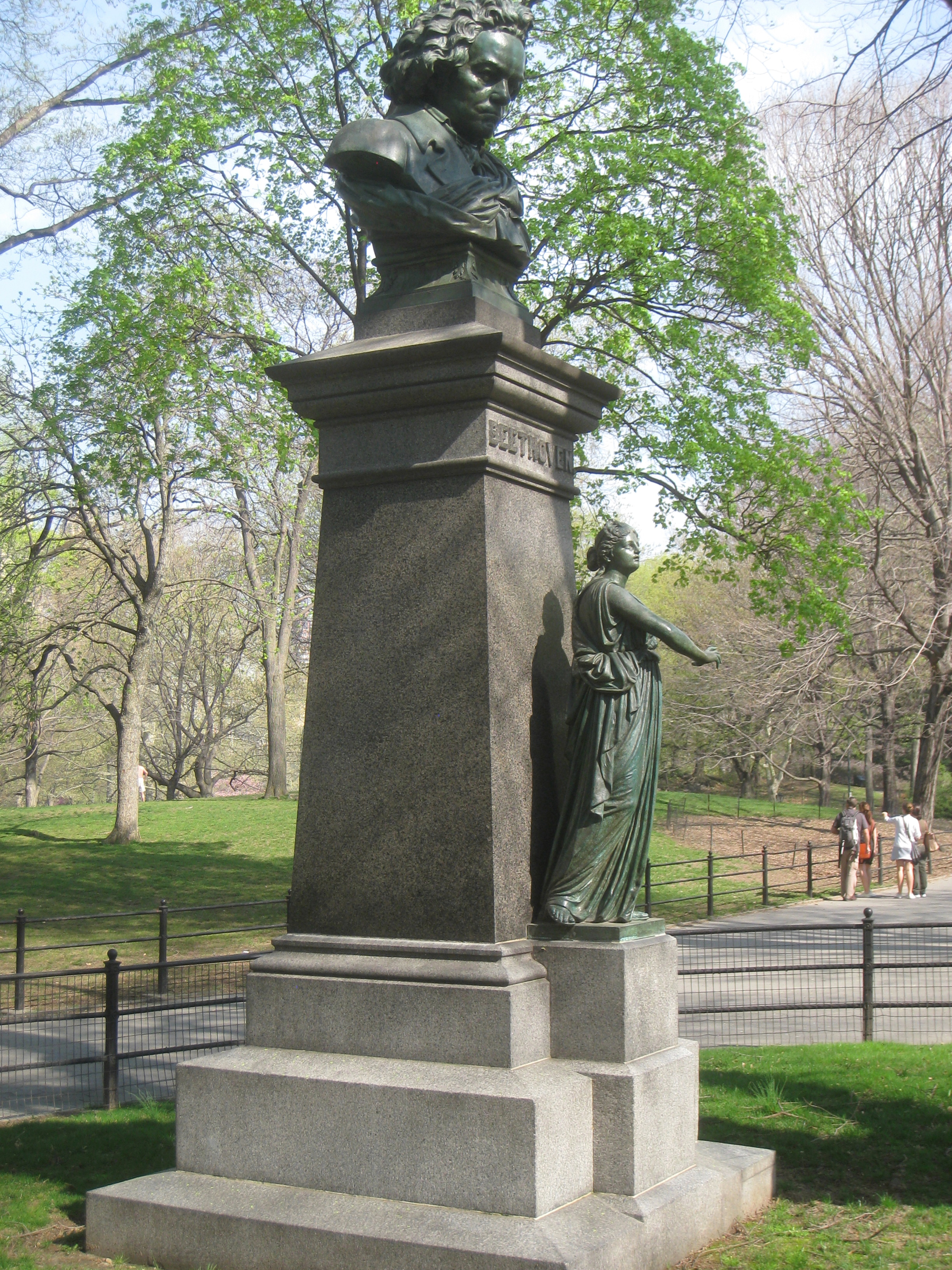
Central Park, Manhattan, New York City

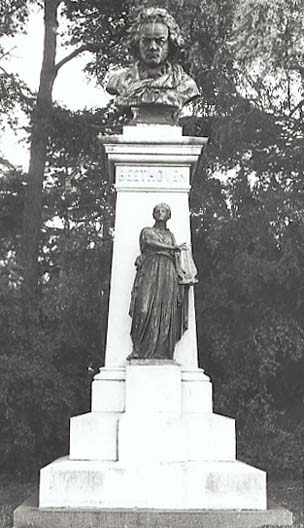
Golden Gate Park, San Francisco

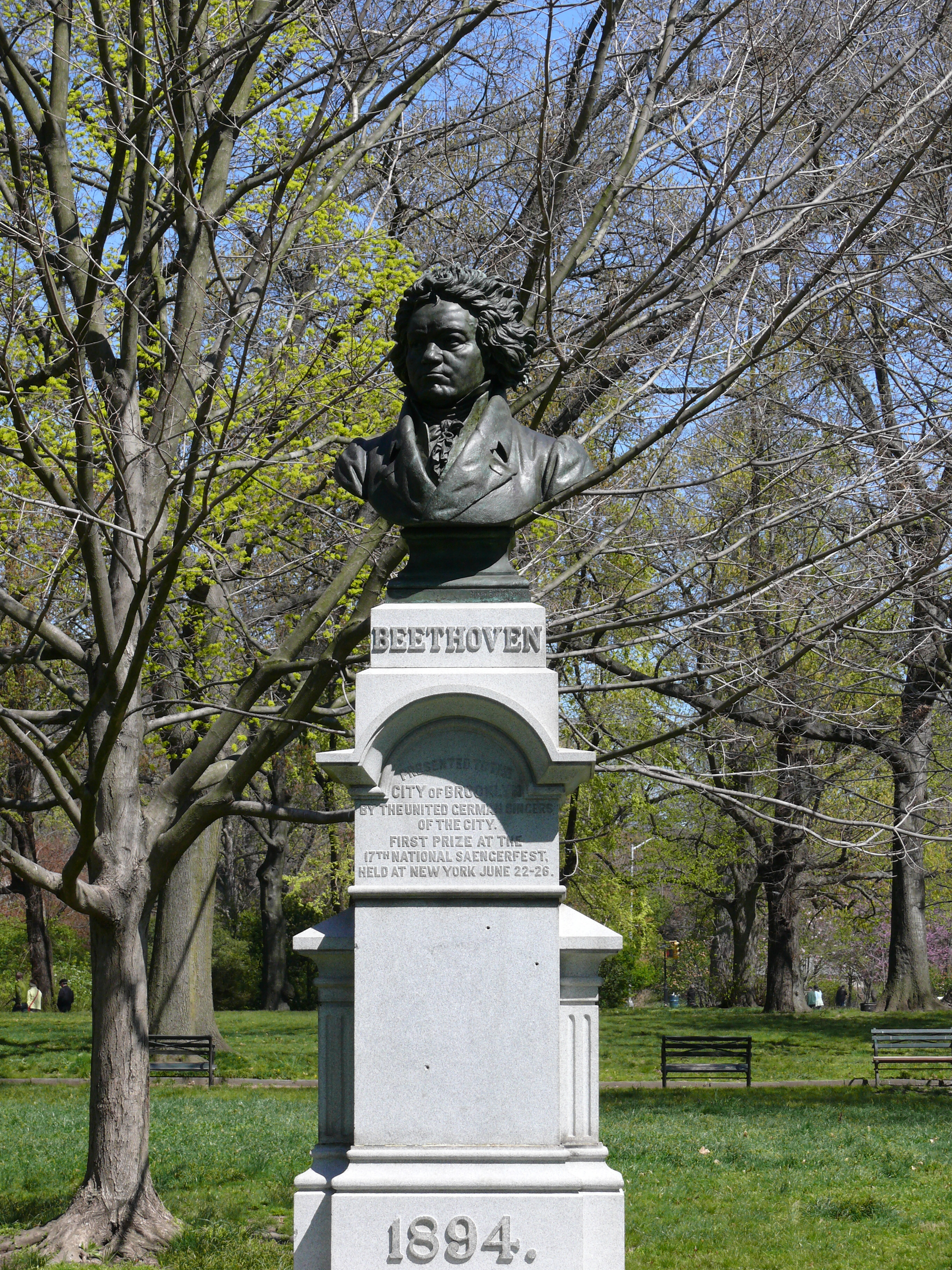
Prospect Park, Brooklyn, New York City

== See also ==
- 1884 in art
