= Beethoven (sculpture) =

Sculpture by Max Klinger

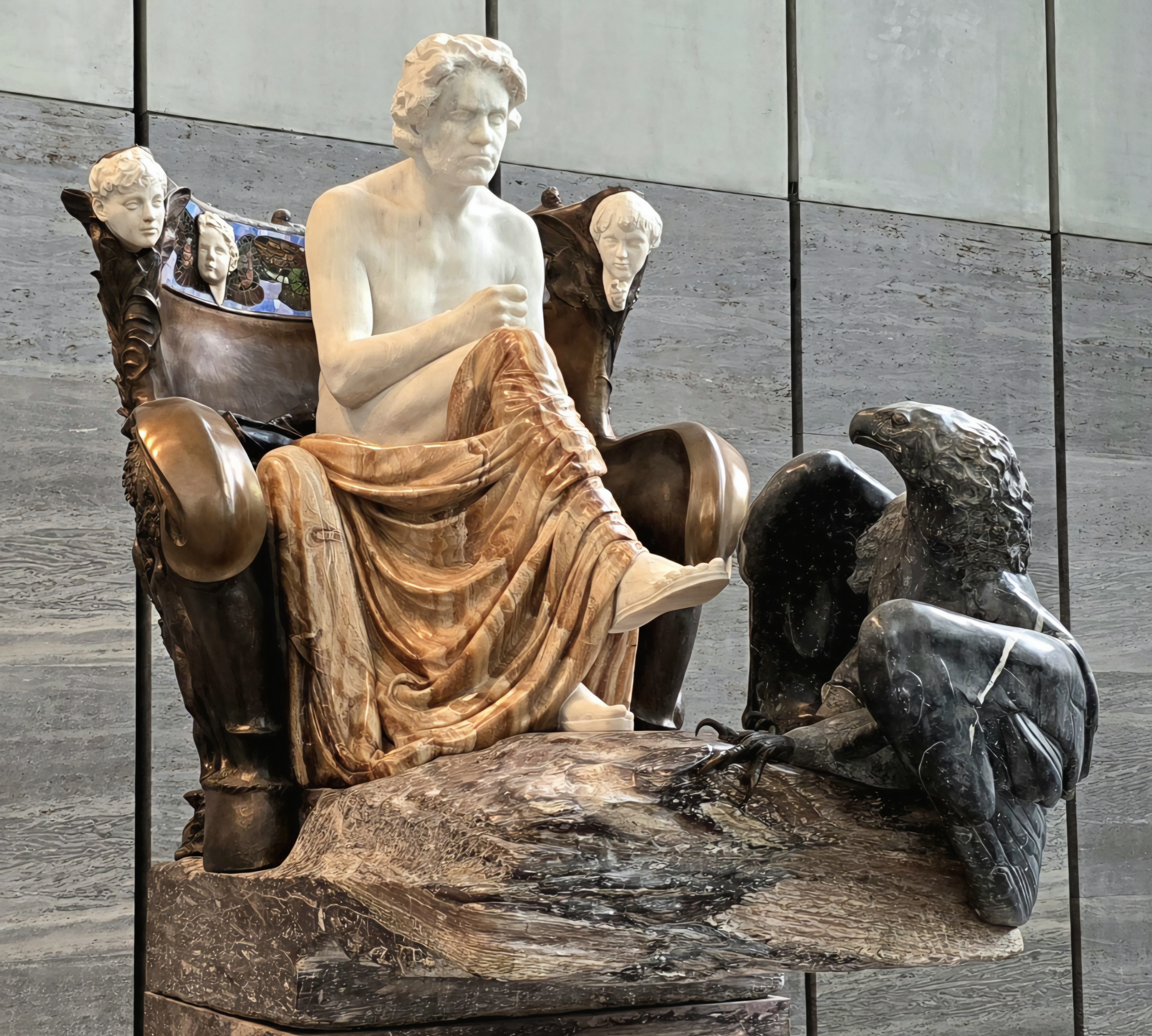
- Artist: Max Klinger
- Year: 1902
- Dimensions: 310 cm (120 in)
- Location: Museum der bildenden Künste, Leipzig

Beethoven is a 1902 sculpture by the German sculptor Max Klinger from 1902. The sculpture is part of the collection of the Museum der bildenden Künste in Leipzig, Germany.

== Description and symbolism ==
On a large black marble pedestal stands a richly decorated throne on which the composer Ludwig van Beethoven sits, with clenched hands and a concentrated, energetic expression, as well as a bare torso. He has an eagle in front of him. This type of representation is that of an Olympic god. Klinger endowed Beethoven with the attributes of the highest ancient god (Zeus or Jupiter). The eagle is the symbolic animal of this god and also alludes to the myth of Prometheus. Beethoven's wide coat that wraps around his lower body and the sandals he wears are also modeled after antique models. With angel heads and allegorical scenes on the outside of the throne, the composer is also associated with Christian motifs.

The Beethoven figure is 150 centimetres (59 in) tall (from head to toe), while the total height of the sculpture is 310 centimetres (120 in).

== Materials ==
Klinger used a variety of different and very valuable materials for sculpture. The upper part of the body and the feet are made of Greek marble from the Syros. For the alabaster-colored clothing, Klinger used Laas marble from South Tyrol. The rock base and eagle are made of Pyrenean marble. He used amber for the eagle's eyes. The claws are made of bronze, as is the throne. The angel heads on top of the throne are made of ivory. Mosaic strips are made of glass, agate, jasper, and nacre. They are underpinned by gold leaf.

== History ==
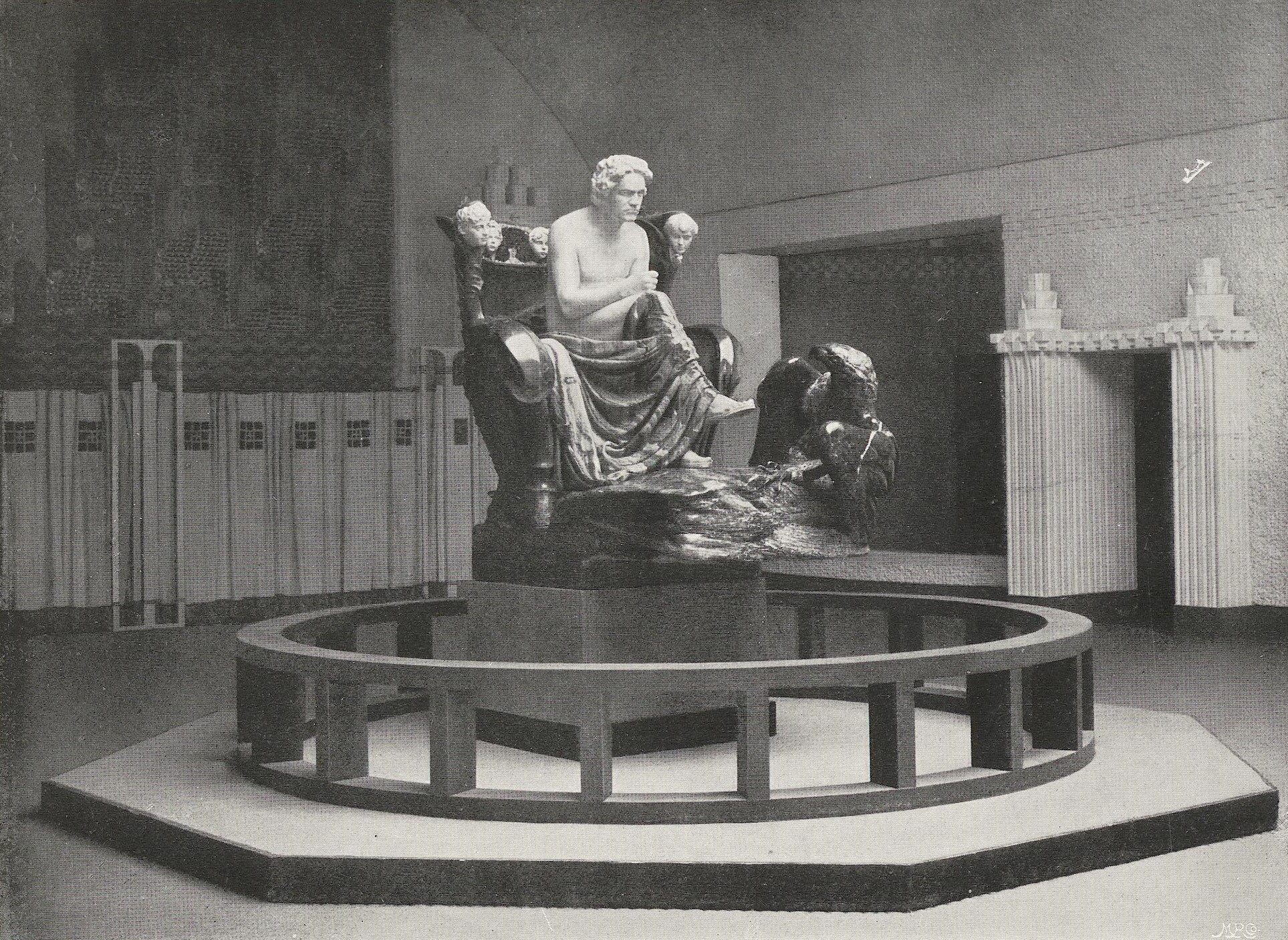
At the Vienna Secession's exhibition

Klinger had the idea for a Beethoven sculpture as early as 1886 during a stay in Paris. Although he immediately began to put the idea into practice, he worked on it for a long time. The sculpture was first presented at the 14th exhibitions of the Vienna Secession where it was unveiled on 15 April 1902. The event received considerable publicity, including newspaper coverage of the sculpture's transportation to the Secession Building and its assembly by Klinger. The sculpture, including all parts, weighs over 4 metric tons (3.9 long tons) or 4 metric tons (4.4 short tons). For transport, it had to be dismantled into several parts. In Leipzig, a committee was formed under the chairmanship of the then mayor Carl Bruno Tröndlin to negotiate the purchase of the sculpture for the Museum der bildenden Künste. In competition with Vienna, the committee was able to secure the purchase price of Goldmark 250,000 demanded by Klinger.

== Disputes ==
It caused controversy for depicting Beethoven as ghost-like and in a hunched position, which critics regarded as a poor tribute. Thomas Mann was among those who praised it precisely because Beethoven looks vulnerable and tender, like someone who has overcome weakness. Mann wrote: "Klinger's frail little Beethoven, who is sitting on a huge godly throne fervently concentrated, his fists clenched—that is a hero."

In his 2013 book A Kingdom Not of This World, Kevin Karnes writes that it "constituted an essential, perhaps the essential, artistic expression of fin-de-siècle utopian longing in the Austro-German artistic world".
