= Laas marble =

Marble from South Tyrol, Italy

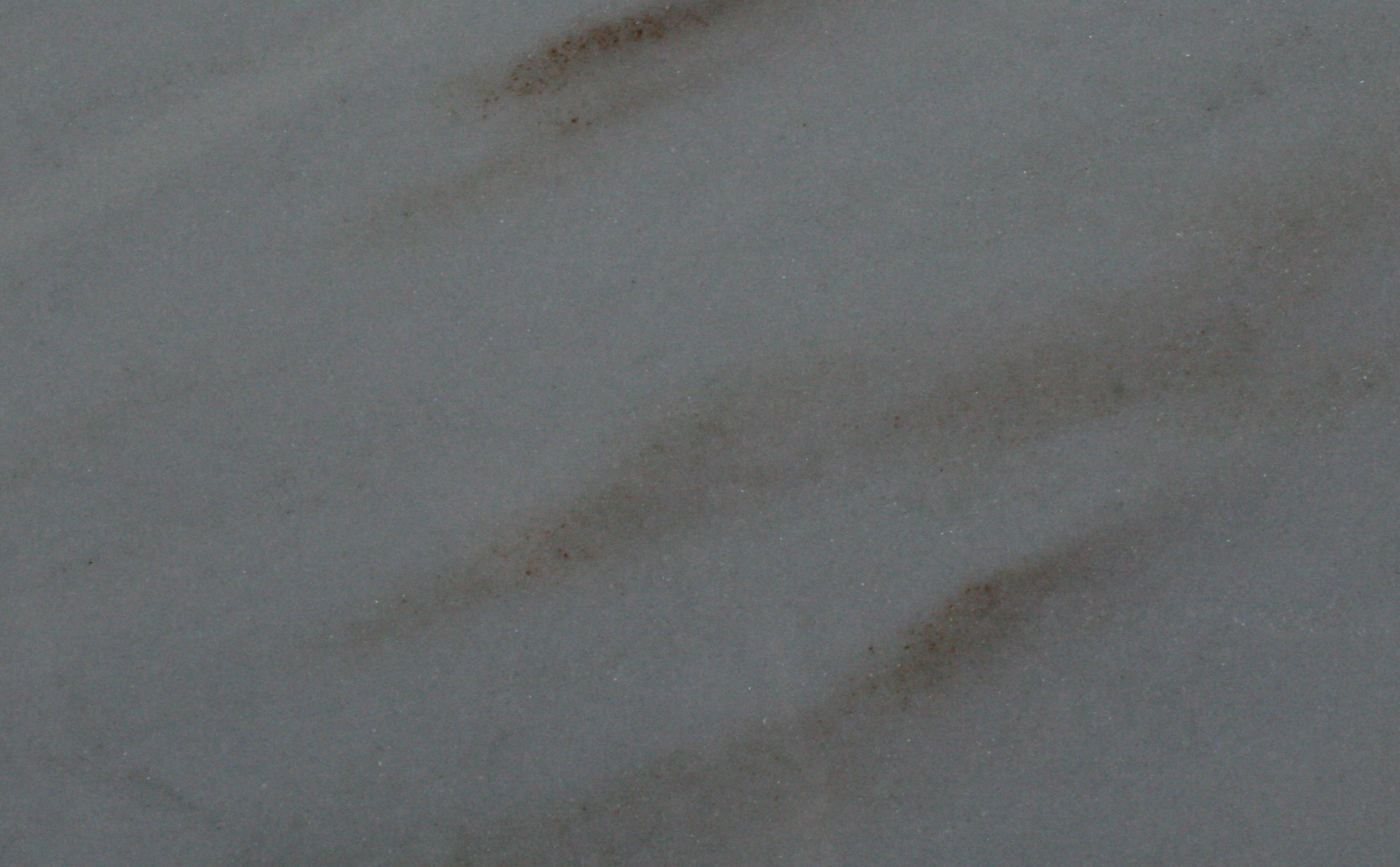
Laas/Lasa marble Lasa Venato Vena d’Oro (“gold vein”), a rare variety of Laas marble. Sample approx. 20 × 13 cm

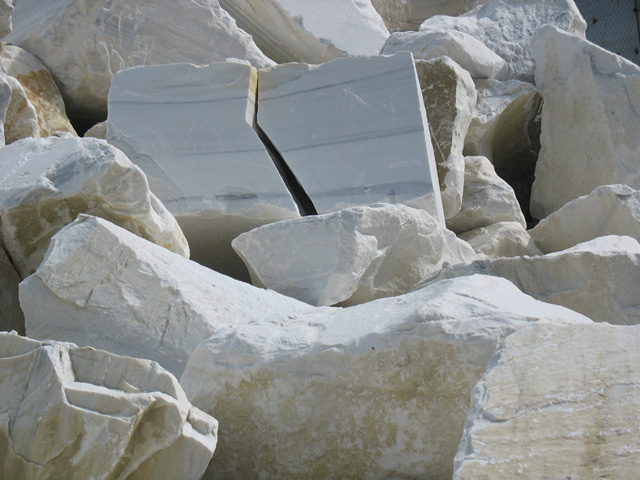
Broken block of Laas/Lasa marble with blue veins

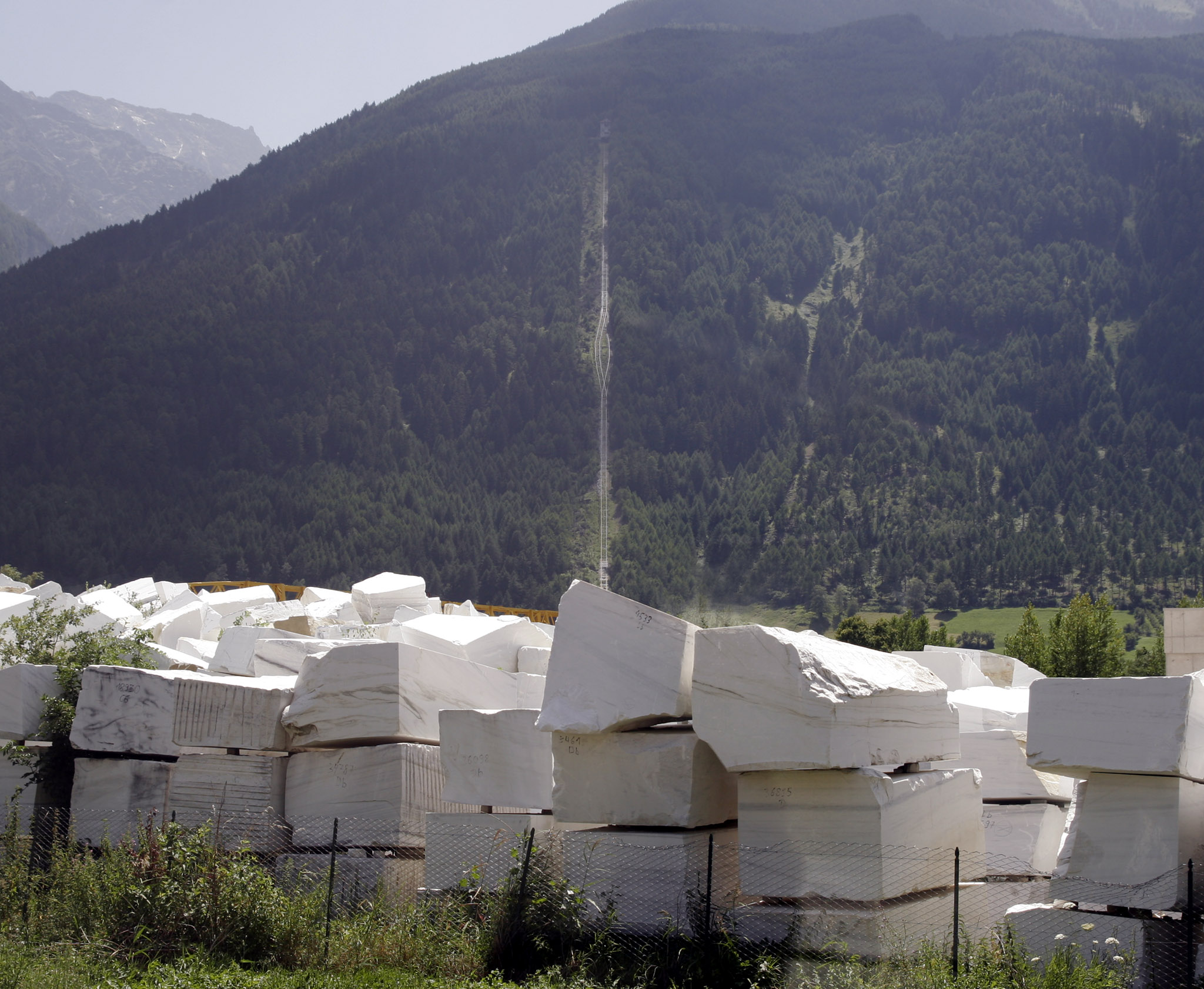
Stacked marble blocks at the Lasa Marmo plant in Laas/Lasa

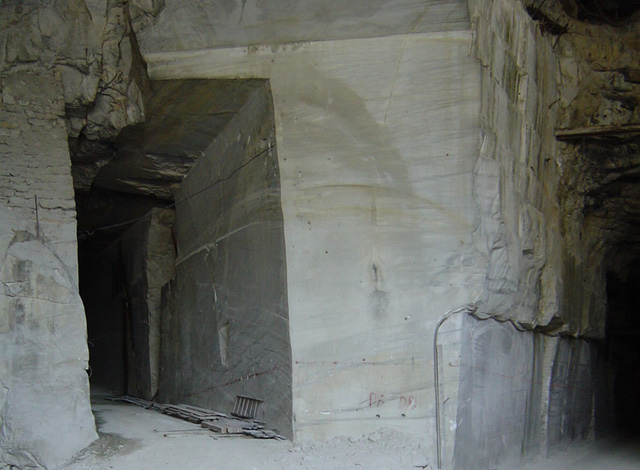
White Water quarry in the Laas/Lasa Valley

Laas marble (German: Laaser Marmor; Italian: marmo di Lasa) is a very strong, robust and weather-resistant marble from South Tyrol, the northernmost and predominantly autonomous province of Italy. It is quarried in the Laas Valley (German: Laaser Tal; Italian: Val di Lasa) in the municipality of Laas, a side valley of the westernmost principal valley of South Tyrol, the Vinschgau (Italian: Valle Venosta).

Due to the bilingual status of the region, the marble is known by both its German and Italian names: Laaser Marmor (German) and marmo di Lasa (Italian). South Tyrol was traditionally and politically part of the Austro-Hungarian Empire until the end of World War I. It was annexed by the Kingdom of Italy in 1920. The designation marmo di Lasa was adopted alongside the long-established German name Laaser Marmor during the Italianization of South Tyrolean place names in 1923.

The municipality of Laas/Lasa and its associated communes had a population of 4,177 residents (as at 31 December 2024). Of those residents, 97.45% speak German as their mother tongue; 2.41% speak Italian as their mother tongue and 0.13% speak Ladin (the third official language of South Tyrol).

The current name “Laaser Marmor”, aligned with the municipality’s name, was known in its early history as Tiroler Marmor (Tyrolean Marble) or Vinschgauer Marmor (Vinschgau Valley Marble). A major boost to the marble being called Laaser Marmor and becoming increasingly well known in the German-speaking countries, regardless of its actual quarrying location in the Laas Valley, came about ever more since the World Expo of 1873 in Vienna, where two companies presented the marble stone in the exhibition area of the Austro-Hungarian Imperial Geological Institute. Especially in the 19th century, numerous stone sculptors favoured using Laas / Lasa Marble (Laaser Marmor), particularly in the Austro-Hungarian Dual Monarchy and the German Empire.

In 1930, the commencement of operations of the company, named at that time, “Società Anonima Lasa per l’Industria del Marmo”, helped to well establish the Italian description “Lasa Marmo”, which was then recognised by the UIBM (Italian Patents and Trademark Office) as a “Storico Marchio di Interesse Nazionale” (‘Historical Trademark of National Interest’) in 2021.

== Geology ==
The Laas Marble deposit is part of a line of other isolated marble deposits in the Ortler Alps in the southern part of the Vinschgau Valley, which are located not far from and parallel to a large geological fault line (Periadriatic Seam). These marble deposits are able to be traced as a belt from Laas/Lasa in the west of South Tyrol to the Puster Valley (Pustertal) in the east. Not all of the exposed marble deposits in this zone have been quarried.

They are mostly embedded in polymetamorphic gneisses, which have undergone a medium to high degree of transformation during their formation. South of Laas/Lasa, predominantly white marble appears on the surface alongside mylonitised mica schists, paragneisses and amphibolites (collectively known as the Laas / Lasa Unit).

This massive deposit of marble in the north-eastern flank of the Ortler Mountains Group encompasses a reserve of approximately 500 million cubic metres. Created 400 million years ago during the Variscan orogeny as the deposits of limestone in Northern Africa were transported via the continental plate drift to the area of modern day Laas/Lasa, means it is now located around 40 kilometres west of Meran/Merano. The limestone was slowly transformed into marble through extreme heat and pressure.

== Quarries ==
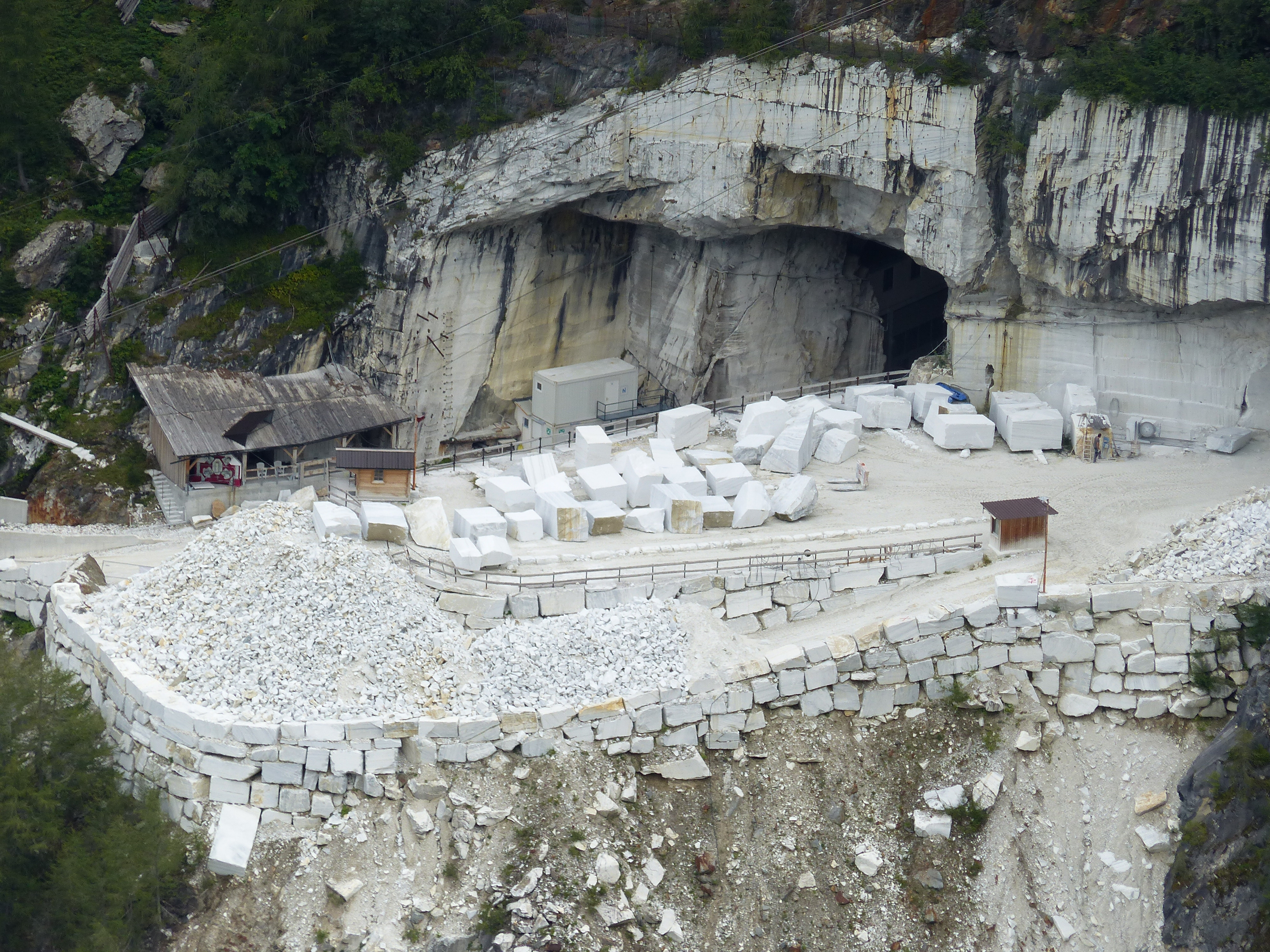
Entrance to the White Water quarry adit

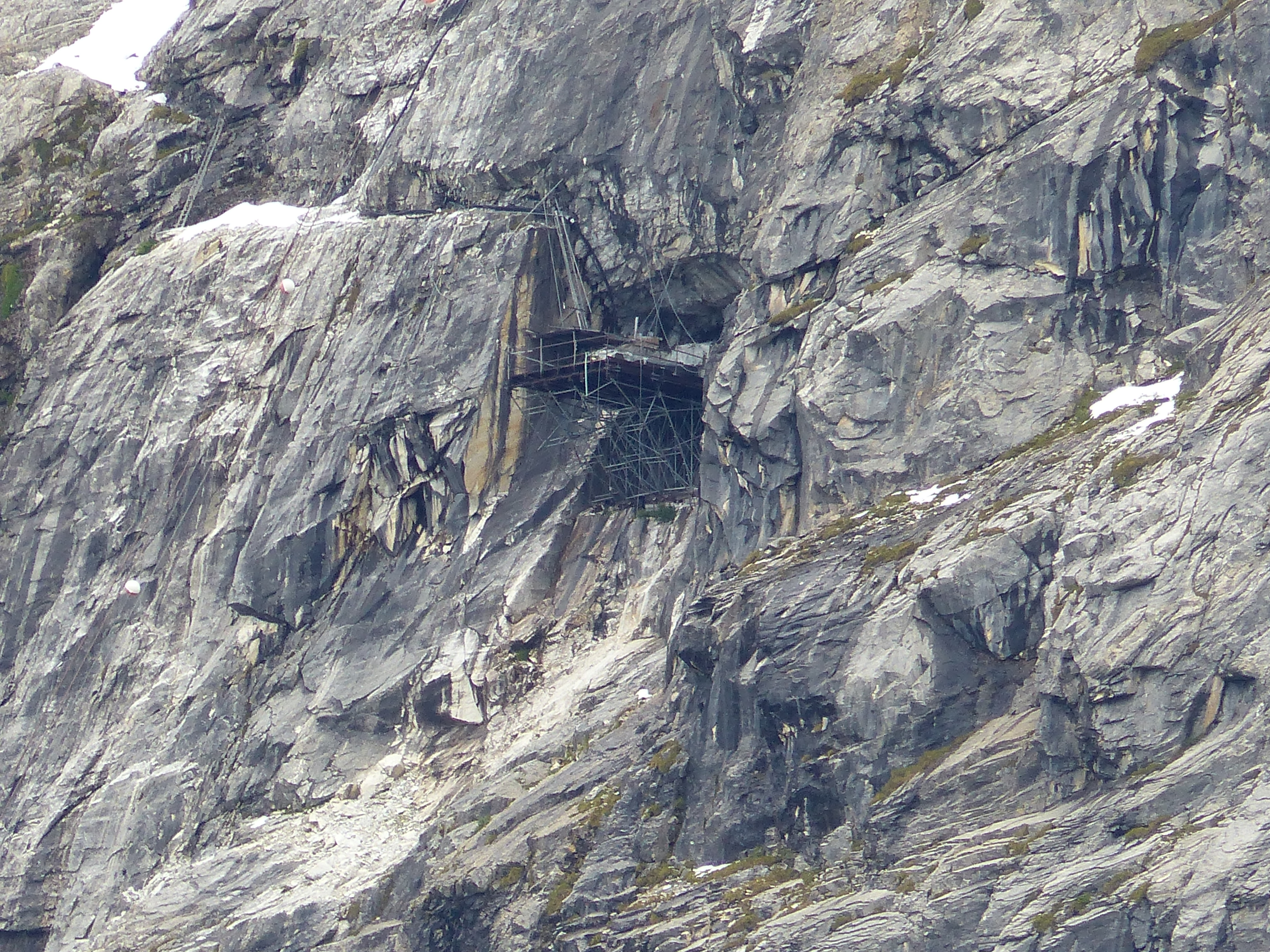
Loading platform of the Upper Jennwand quarry (elevation 2,288 m, Italy)

Within the municipal territory of Laas/Lasa, marble quarrying has historically taken place at several locations. As of 2025, active extraction is carried out in the Weißwasser (White Water) quarry, while other quarry sites within the municipality include Tarnellerbrückl (Tarnell Bridge) and Nesselwand (Nessel Rock Face).

The Jennwand quarry, within the municipal area of Laas/Lasa, has a history of marble extraction and is designated for industrial quarrying. The marble deposit of the Jennwand massif is estimated at approximately 30 million cubic metres.

== Properties and mineral composition ==
The Laas/Lasa Marble is frost-proof and suppliers guarantee its resistance to de-icing salt. Its content of calcium-carbonate is between 96.4 to 98.6%. According to standardized testing (EN 1926), Laas/Lasa marble shows a compressive strength of around 80 MPa. Quartz and mica layers are enclosed, and larger calcite crystals with a rhombohedral structure appear. These properties make Laas/Lasa Marble extremely suitable for outdoor use in regions with very cold and icy conditions. While other types of marble, such as Carrara marble, often cannot withstand such harsh climatic conditions and must be protected from cold and frost, Laas/Lasa Marble shows hardly any damage even at extreme temperatures. This makes it very suitable for façade cladding and other outdoor applications. Other mineral components of the rock include actinolite, dolomite, pyrite, titanite, rutile and zircon.

== Commercial varieties ==
These commercial varieties of Laas/Lasa Marble are well-known: The Pure White Statue Marble is stocked under the name Lasa Bianco Statuario. Within the White Laas/Lasa Marble Group are the varieties: Lasa Bianco Perla, Lasa Bianco Classico, Lasa Bianco Ortles, Lasa Bianco Nuvolato and Lasa Bianco Nuvolato Forte. Lasa Venato is the collective name of the veined varieties on offer and includes these types: Lasa Venato, Lasa Venato Vena d’Oro, Lasa Venato Vena Verde, Lasa Venato Cevedale, Lasa Venato Fior di Melo, Lasa Venato Arabescato und Lasa Venato Fantastico.

There are also polychrome marble types in addition to these aforementioned varieties, particularly in the White Water Quarry (Weißwasserbruch), which usually have a cream-coloured base colour with inclusions in a wide variety of shades (red, yellow, brown, blue, green, grey and black). Every single marble slab and every block of marble is one of a kind. These varieties are offered under the brand name, Lasa !ndiviual.

The various colour nuances of Laas/Lasa Marble are due, among other things, to blue or grey-blue veins caused by inclusions of tourmaline or graphite. Finely distributed graphite colours the marble bluish-grey, while iron oxides such as clinozoisite or limonite produce reddish or yellowish tones. The red-coloured and slightly translucent marble, caused by mineral deposits, is particularly rare.

== History of quarrying marble in Laas/Lasa ==
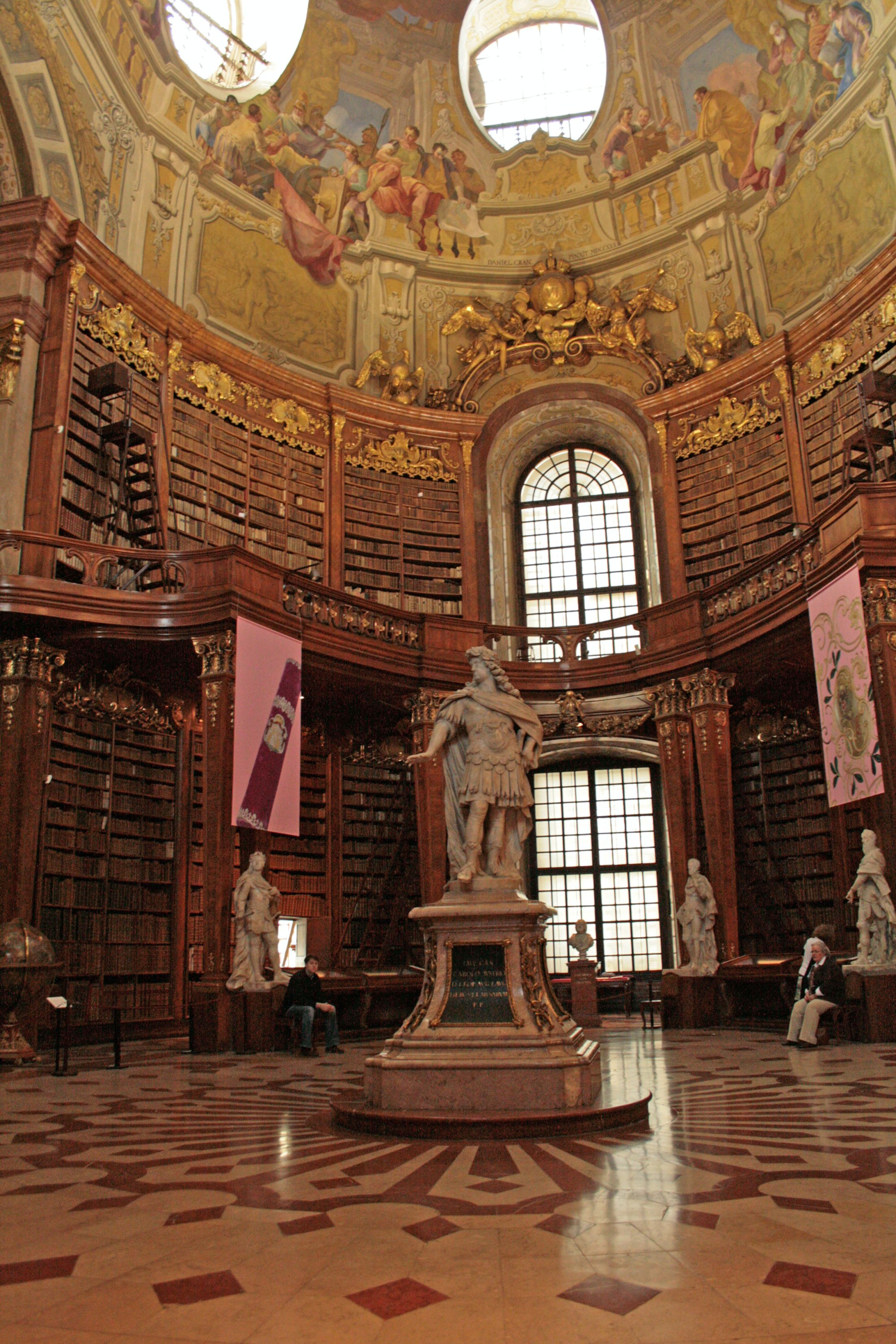
Statues in the Prunksaal der Österreichischen Nationalbibliothek; State Hall of the Austrian National Library (formerly the Vienna Court Library)

=== First mention as a useful stone ===
Already in ancient Roman times, Laas/Lasa Marble was used for producing milestones that were located along the “Via Claudia Augusta” in what is nowadays the Vinschgau Valley in western South Tyrol. The earliest documented indication in reference to Laas/Lasa Marble is in a written form inscribed into a gravestone, that Bishop Viktor III of Chur (in eastern Switzerland) brought from Vinschgau Valley around 720 A.D. and had it erected for someone whose name is not truly able to be identified: “Hic sub ista lapide marmorea, qvem Vector ver in lvster preses ordinabit venire de Venostes, hic reqviescit dominus” (‘Here, beneath this marble stone, which the esteemed Count Victor had brought from the Vinschgau Valley, this gent rests’).

=== Today’s mining ===
Laas/Lasa Marble is quarried all year round in the White Water Quarry (Weißwasserbruch) in the Laas/Lasa Valley, which geographically belongs to the municipality of Laas/Lasa. In the underground White Water Quarry, located at approximately 1,500 metres above sea level, pure white marble is extracted in mining halls measuring about 100 metres in length, 20 metres in width, and 30 to 40 metres in height. The diamond wire saws and a diamond cutting machine used in the process cut marble layers weighing up to 8,000 tonnes from the mountain, which are then cut into standard block sizes of approximately 3.20 × 1.20 × 1.40 metres.

== Well-known monuments and buildings ==
=== Victoria Memorial in London ===
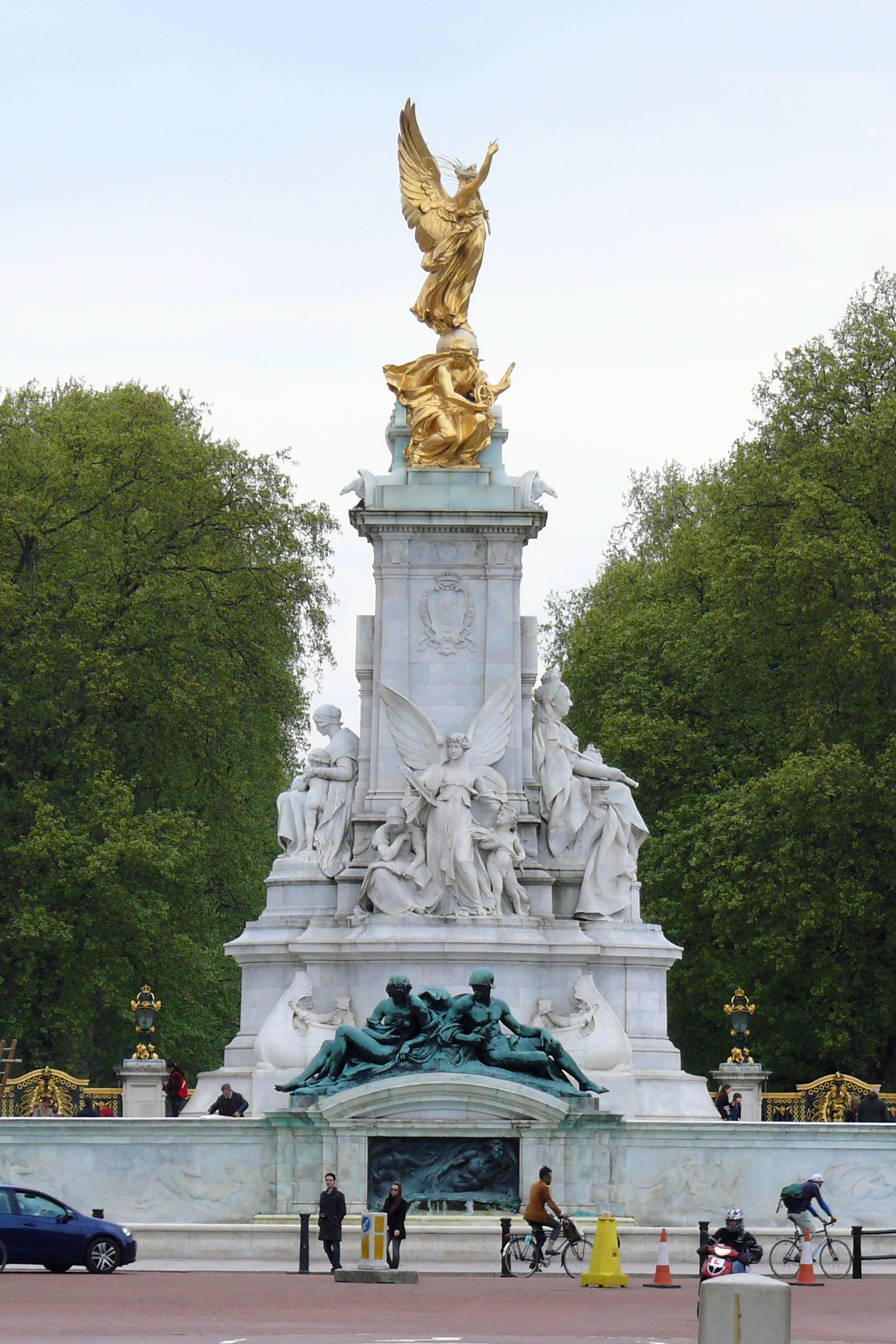
The Victoria Memorial in London

The Victoria Memorial is a 25-metre-high monument featuring a group of figures made of Laas/Lasa Marble, erected in honour of Queen Victoria. The memorial stands at the south-western end of The Mall, directly in front of Buckingham Palace, and is one of London's most famous monuments. It was unveiled on 16 May 1911. The design and overall layout are by Sir Aston Webb, while the sculptural work is by British artist Thomas Brock. The ensemble includes the gilded Goddess of Victory at the top and several allegorical female figures. The central pylon of the memorial is made of Greek marble, while all sculptural works and figures are carved from Laas/Lasa marble and gilt bronze. Although its Beaux-Arts and Edwardian Baroque design was already considered traditional for the early modern period, the work, weighing around 2,300 tonnes, is one of the most impressive national monuments in the United Kingdom. The memorial was erected on land that was used for silkworm breeding in the Middle Ages and later converted into a country house. This estate became the property of the royal family in 1763 and was expanded into what is now Buckingham Palace, in front of which the monument still stands today.

=== Marble crosses on American soldier cemeteries ===
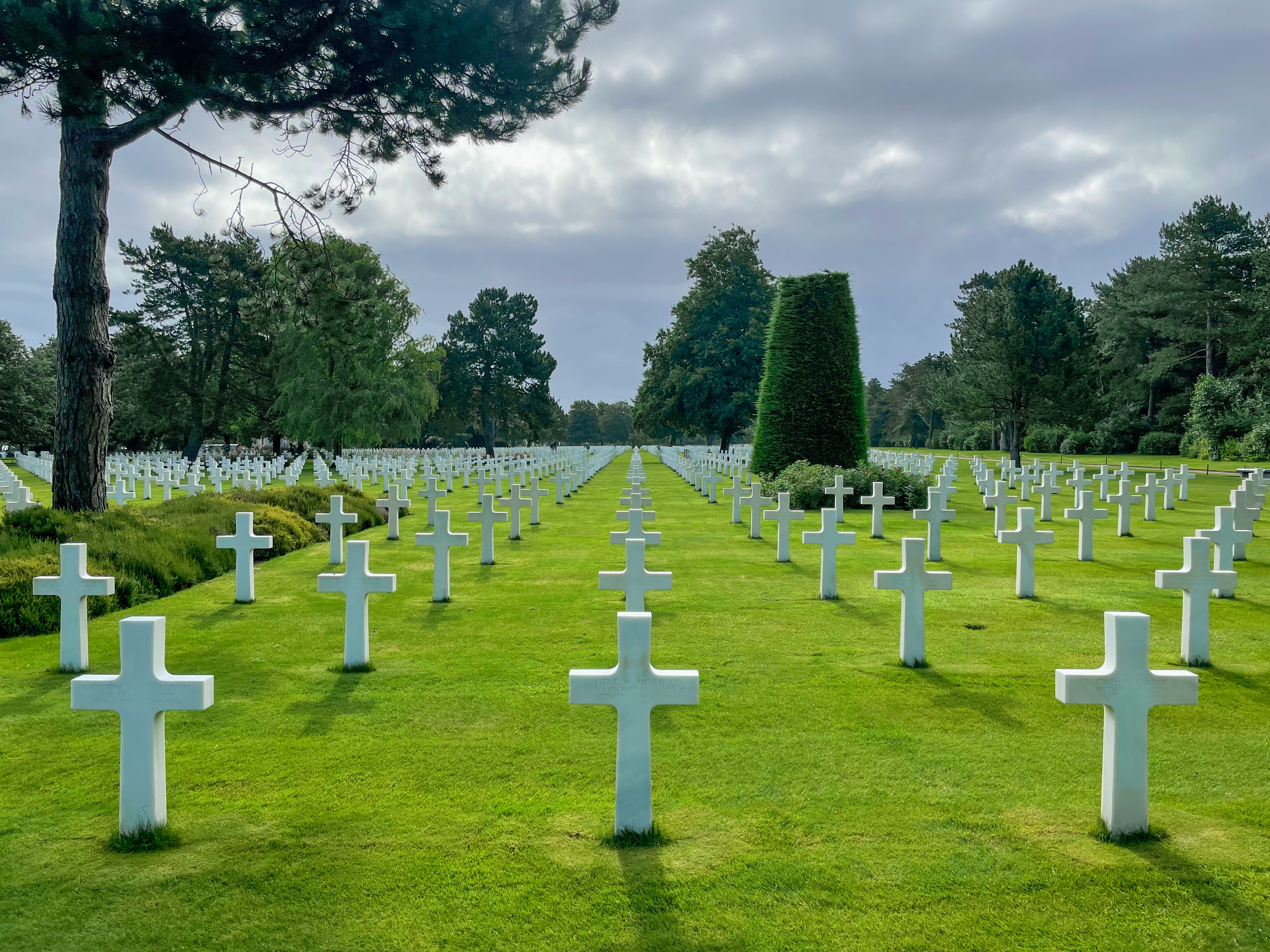
Normandy American Cemetery and Memorial

Between 1949 and 1962, the Laas/Lasa Marble industry received its largest order to date: the production of pure white grave crosses and Stars of David for US soldiers who fell in the Second World War. The client was the American Battle Monuments Commission (ABMC), which selected exclusively white marble from the White Water quarry in the Lasa Valley for its war graves. Extensive investments were made to implement this major project, which at times employed almost 600 workers. Each cross produced was inspected on site by ABMC representatives and only accepted if it was of impeccable quality. By 1962, the company Lasa Marmo had produced and delivered a total of 90,156 gravestones, for which the ABMC paid around 3.2 million US dollars. The white marble crosses and Stars of David made from Laas/Lasa Marble now stand in 15 American military cemeteries from the Second World War, 13 of which are in Europe and one each in Tunisia and the Philippines. The company continues to produce replacement stones for the ABMC to replace damaged grave markers in these cemeteries.

=== Sheikh Zayed Grand Mosque, Abu Dhabi ===
Sheikh Zayed Grand Mosque in Abu Dhabi

One of the biggest mosques in the world is the Sheikh Zayed Grand Mosque in Abu Dhabi, which was constructed between 1994 and 2007. The planners chose two types of white marble from the White Water Quarry, Lasa Bianco Classico und Lasa Bianco Ortles for the extensive interior wall and floor coverings. These were the only types that met the requirements for polished, sandblasted and bush-hammered surfaces with a uniform colour tone. Around 20,000 m² of marble slabs as well as 27,000 m³ of solid pieces were supplied in total by Lasa Marmo which were used for decorative elements, including arches, column cladding, cornices and inlaid panels. The use of the material is particularly impressive in the large prayer hall, whose walls, arches and floor surfaces are largely made of Laas/Lasa Marble. Floral inlays made of semi-precious stones, glass and gold were incorporated into the marble surfaces. The mosque, which can accommodate around 40,000 worshippers, was named after Sheikh Zayed bin Sultan Al Nahyan, the founder of the United Arab Emirates. Today, it is one of the most important religious buildings in the region and is open to visitors of all faiths. The project was one of the largest and most challenging contracts in the Lasa Marmo company's history.

=== World Trade Center Transportation Hub, New York ===
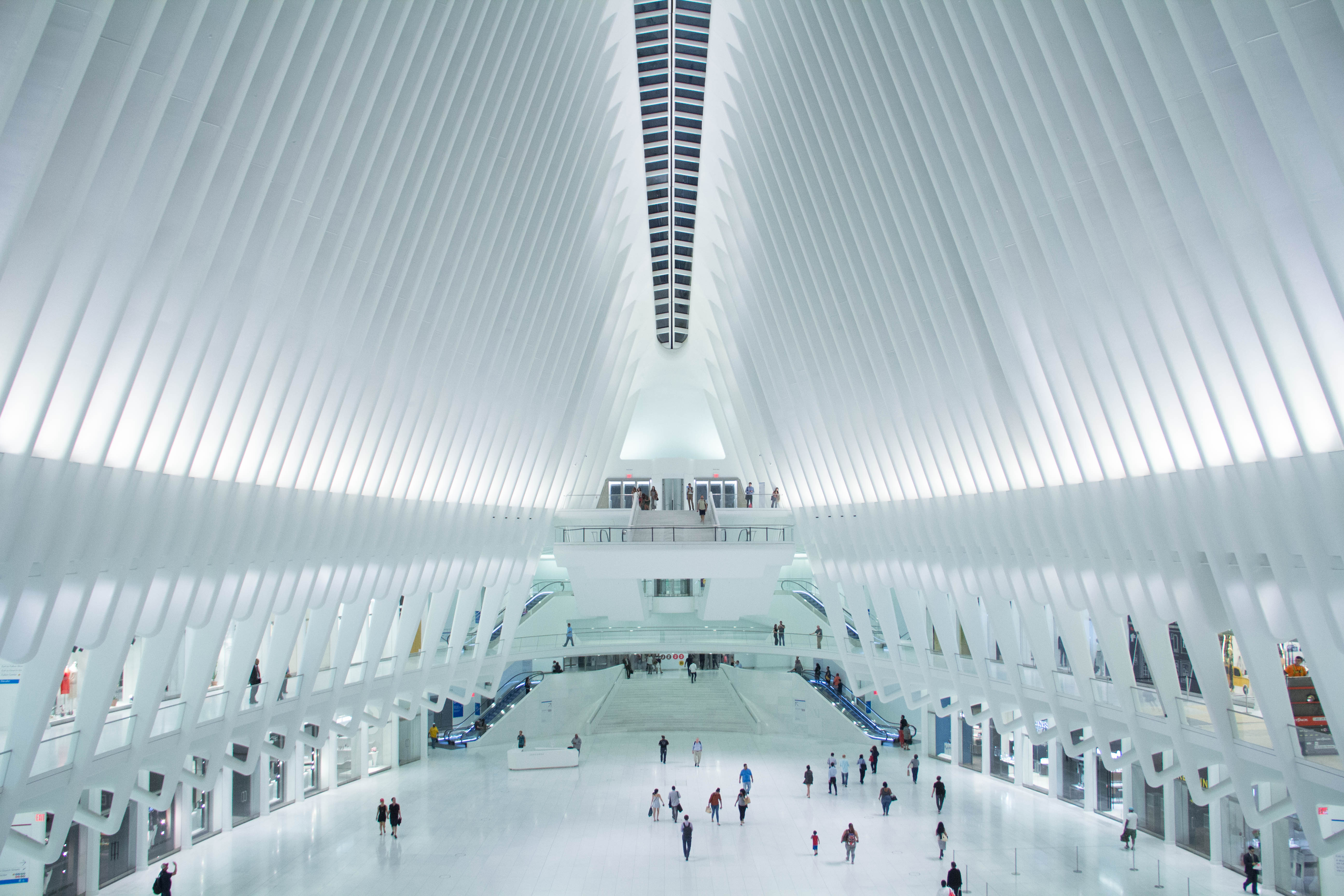
World Trade Center Transportation Hub (Oculus), New York City

The design of the World Trade Center Transportation Hub in New York by the architect Santiago Calatrava required considerable quantities of Laas/Lasa Marble which were supplied by Lasa Marmo between 2012 and 2016; in actual fact around 40,000 m² of the type Lasa Bianco Nuvolato. Over 70,000 individually manufactured components – including floor and wall panels, plinths, solid stair treads and special moulded parts – with a total weight of around 3,000 tonnes were produced at the factory in Laas/Lasa and transported by ship to the USA. The station, whose exterior shape is modelled on a white dove of peace and which bears the name ‘Oculus’, was opened on the 3rd of March 2016. Today, the light-coloured Laas/Lasa Marble characterises the appearance of the main hall and numerous connecting passages and platforms, forming a central design element of the Port Authority Trans-Hudson’s (PATH) largest transit hub.

=== Finlandia Hall, Helsinki ===
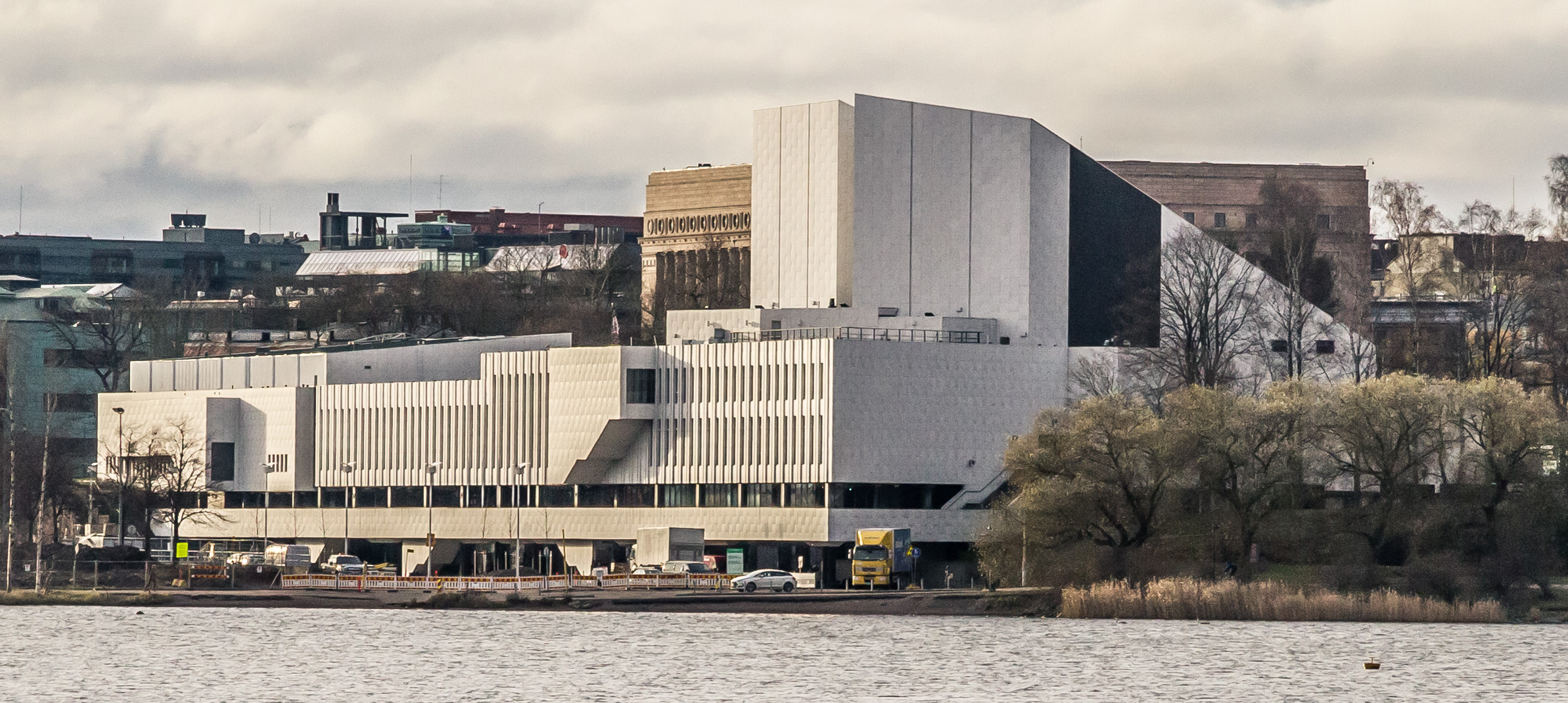
Finlandia Hall in Helsinki, photographed in 2014, before the later façade renovation

The landmark building Finlandia Hall in Helsinki, designed by the Finnish architect, Alvar Aalto and completed in 1971, gained a complete facelift between 2022 and 2023 with a new outer façade made of Lasa Bianco Nuvolato marble from Laas/Lasa. The Carrara marble which was originally used proved unsuitable for Helsinki's harsh climate and had to be replaced. The choice of material was based on the results of the EU research project TEAM (2000–2005), which investigated the durability of various types of marble. Laas/Lasa Marble proved to be particularly resistant to frost and to the so-called bowing effect, a typical deformation of many marble façades. For the renovation project, 6,800 m² of 3 cm thick façade panels were manufactured and intensively tested, including around 12,000 individual parts, the quality of which was checked using ultrasound and material tests. Under the architectural direction of Teemu Tuomi (Arkkitehdit NRT Oy), the façade was renovated in the spirit of Aalto's original design. Thanks to its technical properties and light, uniform aesthetics, Laas/Lasa Marble blends harmoniously into the building's characteristic black and white concept. On the 4th of January 2025, the renovated Finlandia Hall was ceremoniously reopened. The project is considered exemplary for sustainable marble renovations in cold climates and highlights the importance of Laas/Lasa Marble as a high-quality material for demanding international architectural projects.
