= Johann Andreas Streicher =

German piano maker and composer (1761–1833)

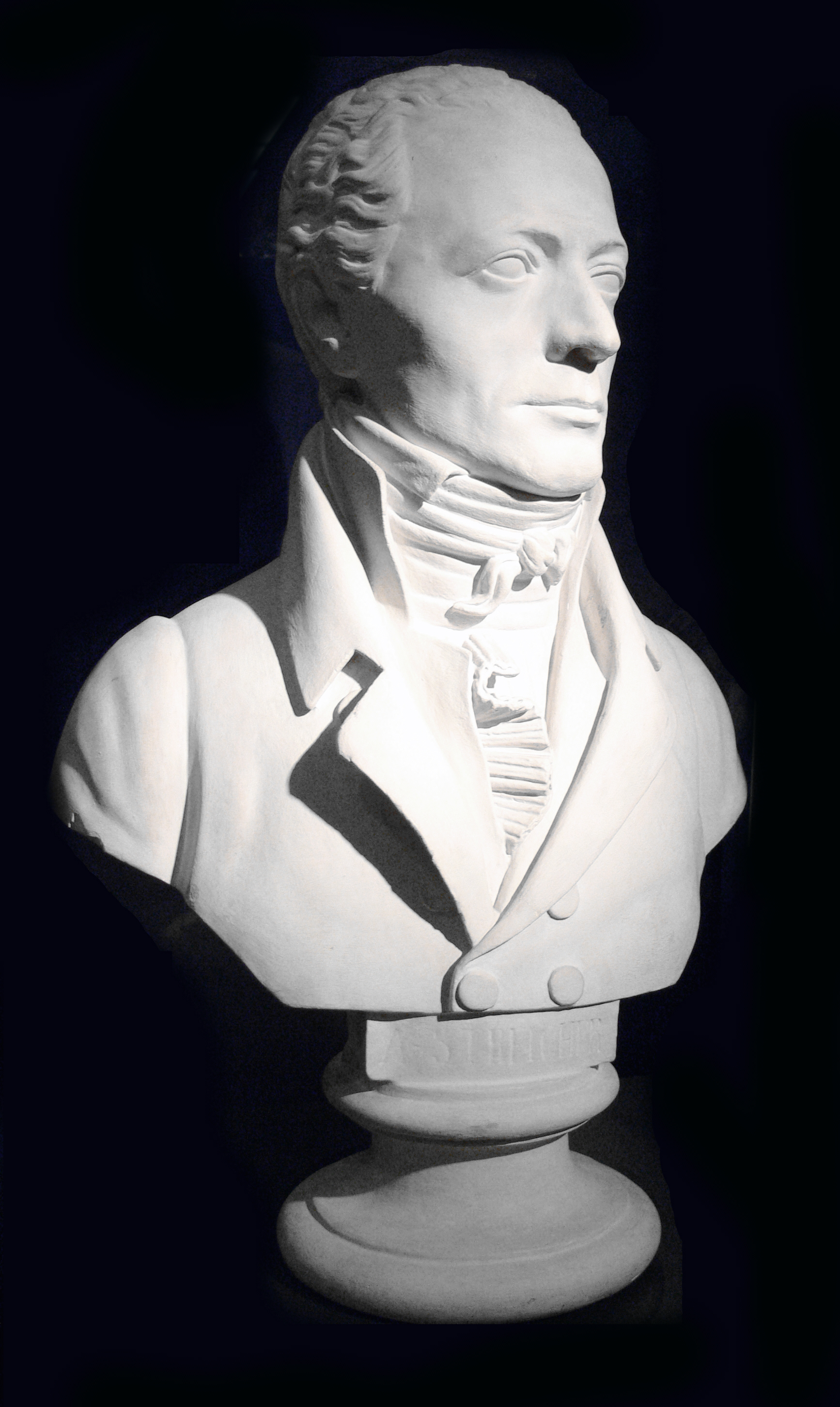
Andreas Streicher—bust by Viennese sculptor Franz Klein

Johann Andreas Streicher (13 December 1761 – 25 May 1833) was a German pianist, composer and piano maker. In 1793, he married Nannette Streicher (1769–1833), another piano maker and daughter of Augsburg piano maker Johann Andreas Stein. In 1794, they moved to Vienna. From that time, Streicher worked as a piano teacher and became increasingly known for his compositions. The Streicher piano-making business provided at least one fortepiano to Beethoven in his early years, of which the composer was fond, writing that it was "too good for me ... because it robs me of the freedom to produce my own tone".

== Works ==
- (S. [Johann Andreas Streicher]): Schiller’s Flucht von Stuttgart und Aufenthalt in Mannheim von 1782 bis 1785. Stuttgart und Augsburg, Verlag der J[ohann]. G[eorg]. Cotta’schen Buchhandlung [Inhaber: Georg von Cotta], 1836. [Incomplete text of the biography without the final chapters.]
- (Johann)Andreas Streichers Schiller-Biographie. Hrsg. von Herbert Kraft. (Mannheim, Wien, Zürich 1974) (Forschungen zur Geschichte Mannheims und der Pfalz, hrsg. von der Gesellschaft der Freunde Mannheims und der ehemaligen Kurpfalz. Mannheimer Altertumsverein von 1859, Neue Folge, 5). [First complete edition with a commentary based on the manuscripts.]
- Zehn Choral-Vorspiele für Orgel (mit cantus firmus), op. 4
