= Franz Klein (sculptor) =

Austrian sculptor

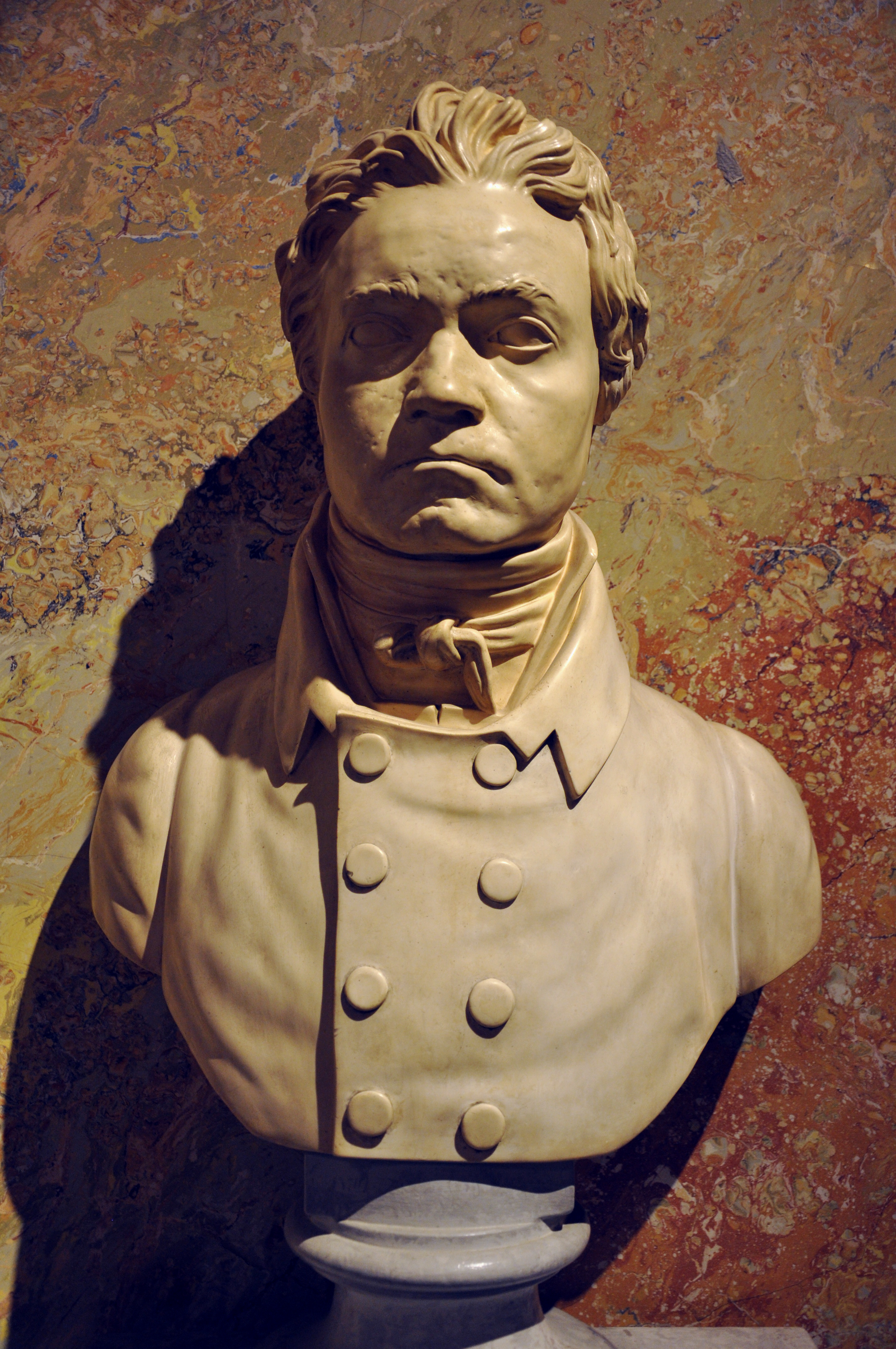
Bust of Beethoven, by Franz Klein (1812)

Franz Klein (1779–1840) was an Austrian sculptor; he was born and died in Vienna. He is known particularly for his bust of Ludwig van Beethoven, made in 1812.

== The life mask ==
Johann Andreas Streicher, pianist and piano-maker, and friend of Beethoven, supervised a private concert hall in Vienna, and in 1812 statues of musicians, sculptured by Klein, were placed in the hall. For the statue of Beethoven, Streicher commissioned Klein to make a life mask of Beethoven.

Creating the mask involved spreading fluid plaster on the face; the first attempt failed, as Beethoven thought he might suffocate. The second attempt was successful. H. C. Robbins Landon has written that this life mask is "without any question, the most important documentary evidence of Beethoven's features." From the life mask, Klein made a bust of Beethoven; the eyes, hair and clothes were added by the sculptor. During the 19th century, various copies of the sculpture were made, in plaster or bronze.

=== Later history of the life mask ===
Sculptor Anton Dietrich acquired the life mask, from which he made several busts of Beethoven, the first of them shown in 1820. After Dietrich's death the life mask was acquired by the sculptor Kaspar von Zumbusch, who created a monument of Beethoven in Vienna (1873–1880).

A mask came into the hands of Bulgarian-born Parisian painter Michel Katzaroff. After painting 36 portraits of Beethoven, in around 1952 Katzaroff gave the life mask to violinist and composer Eve Hungerford, who was very much interested in Beethoven. Beethoven's life mask (dated "1827?") was presented to the National Library of Australia by her nephew of and is part of Hungerford's manuscript collection of papers.
