= Henry Baerer =

American sculptor (1837–1908)

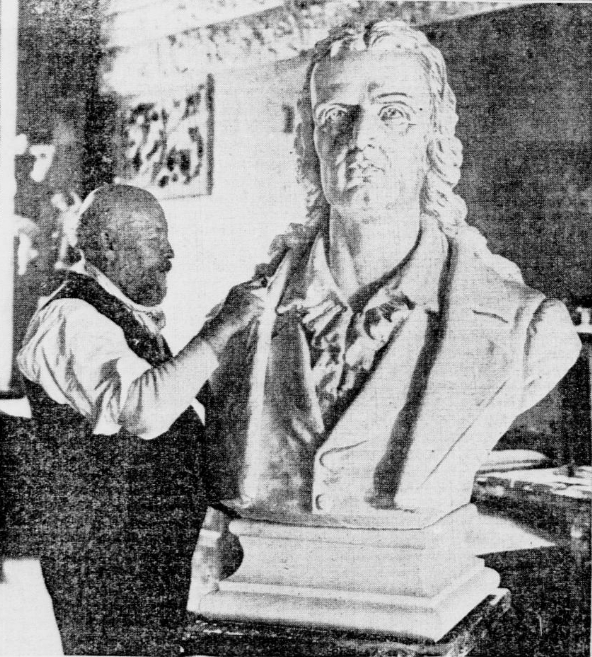
- Baerer with bust of Friedrich Schiller, 1905
- Born: 1837
- Died: 1908 (aged 70–71)
- Notable work: Bronze bust of Beethoven
- Style: sculpture

Henry Baerer (1837–1908) was an American sculptor born in Kirchheim, Hesse, Germany.

== Works ==
Works include:

- two versions of the Puck magazine mascot on the Puck Building, New York (1886)
- Bronze bust of Beethoven for a monument in Central Park (1884)
  - Nearly identical bust in Prospect Park, Brooklyn
  - Identical monument in Golden Gate Park, San Francisco (dedicated 1915)
- Bust of John Howard Payne in Prospect Park, Brooklyn (Moved to Home, Sweet Home Museum located at 14 James Ln, East Hampton, NY 11937)
- Statue of Edward Brush Fowler in Fort Greene Park, Brooklyn
- Bust of Franz Schubert in Fairmount Park, Philadelphia
- Statue of Gouverneur K. Warren in Grand Army Plaza, Brooklyn, New York
- Bronze statue of Conrad Poppenhusen in College Point, Queens, New York

== Gallery of works ==
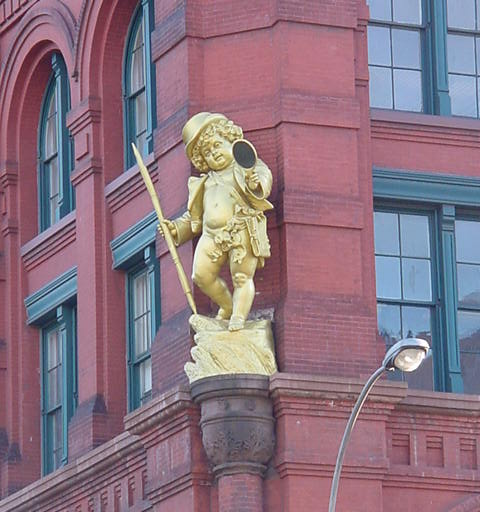
Puck

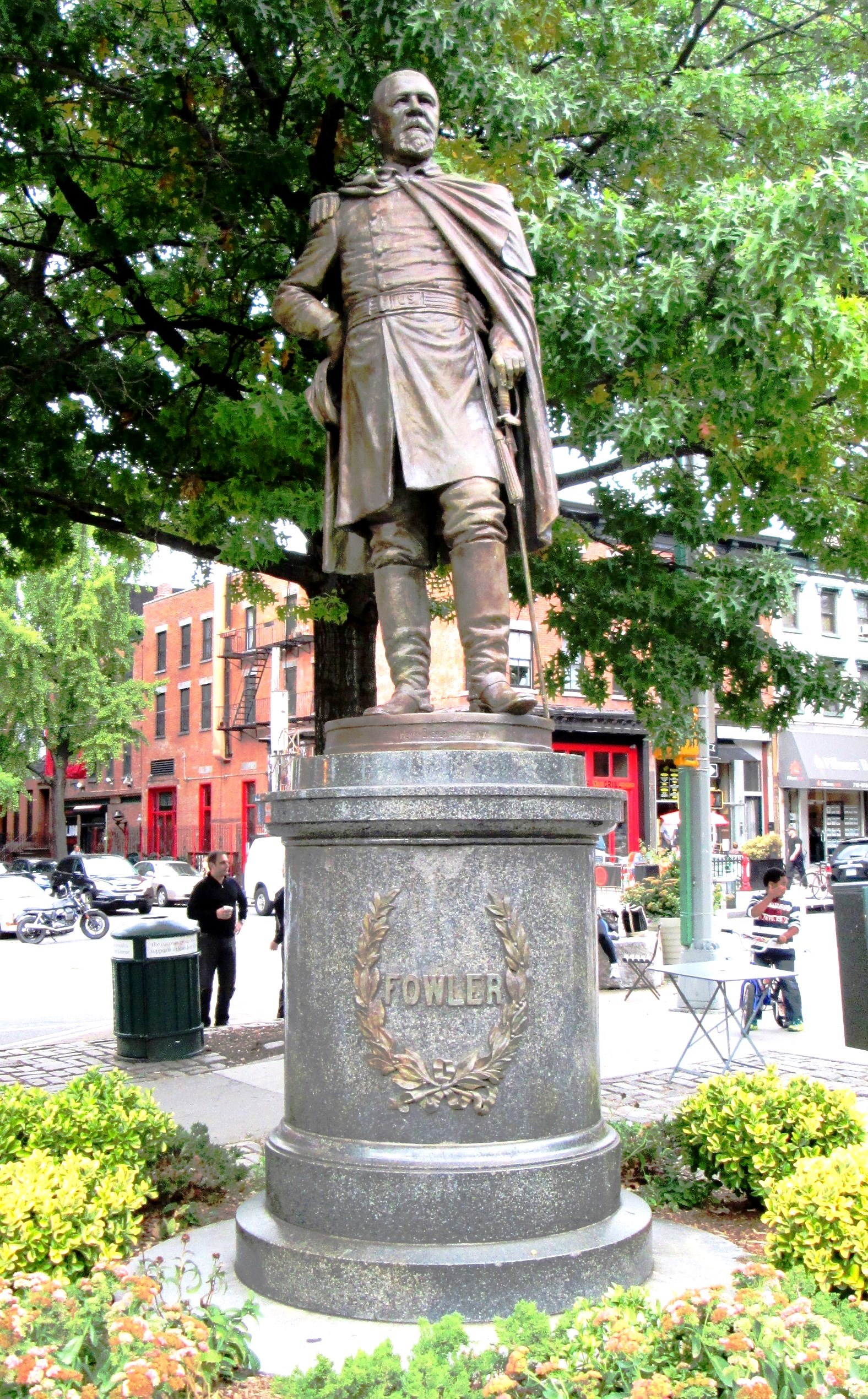
General Edward Brush Fowler

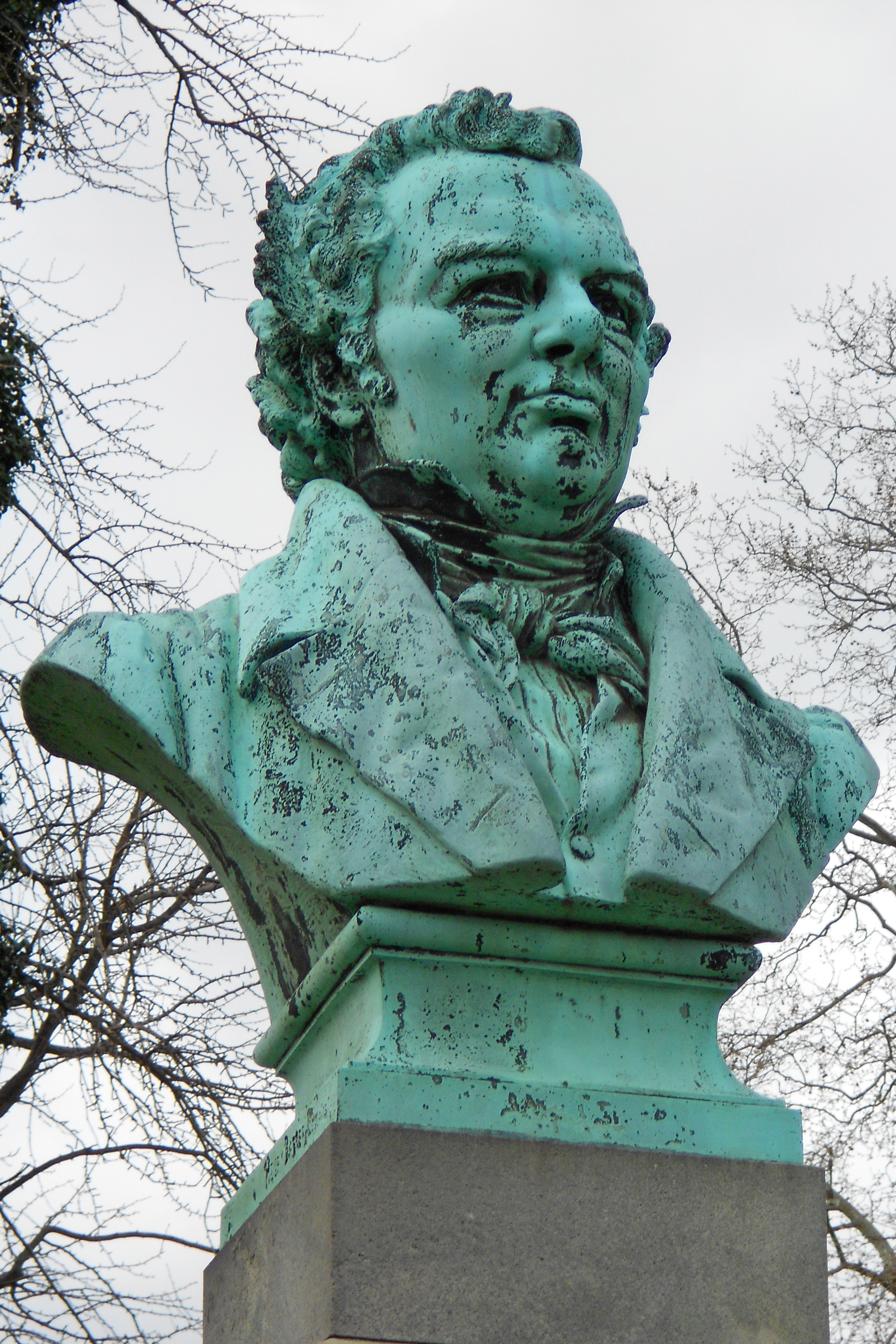
Bust of Schubert

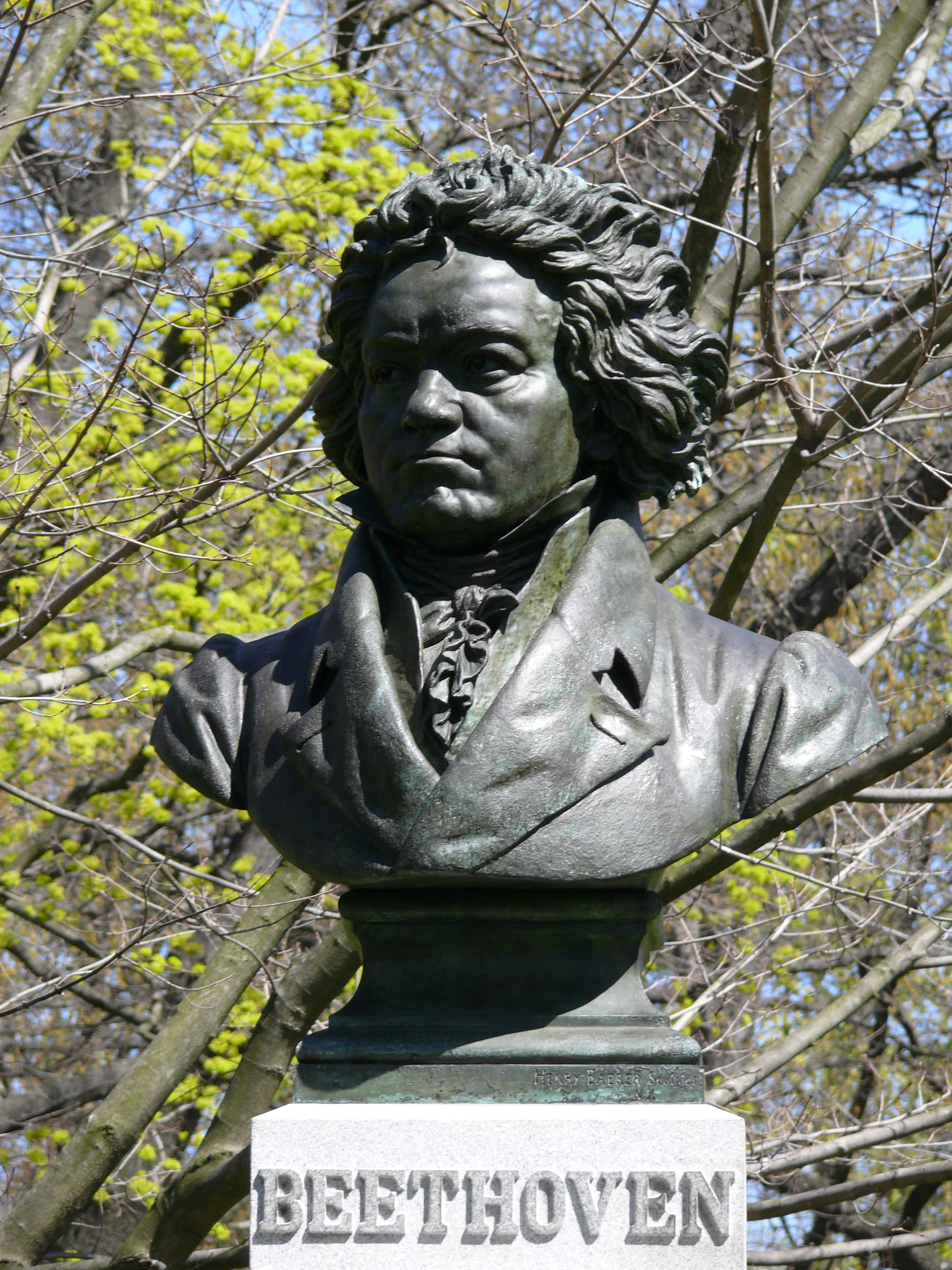
Bust of Beethoven
