= Hugo Hagen =

German sculptor (1818–1871)

- Born: 1818
- Died: 14 April 1871 (aged 52–53); Berlin, German Empire
- Occupation: Sculptor
- Years active: 1842-1871

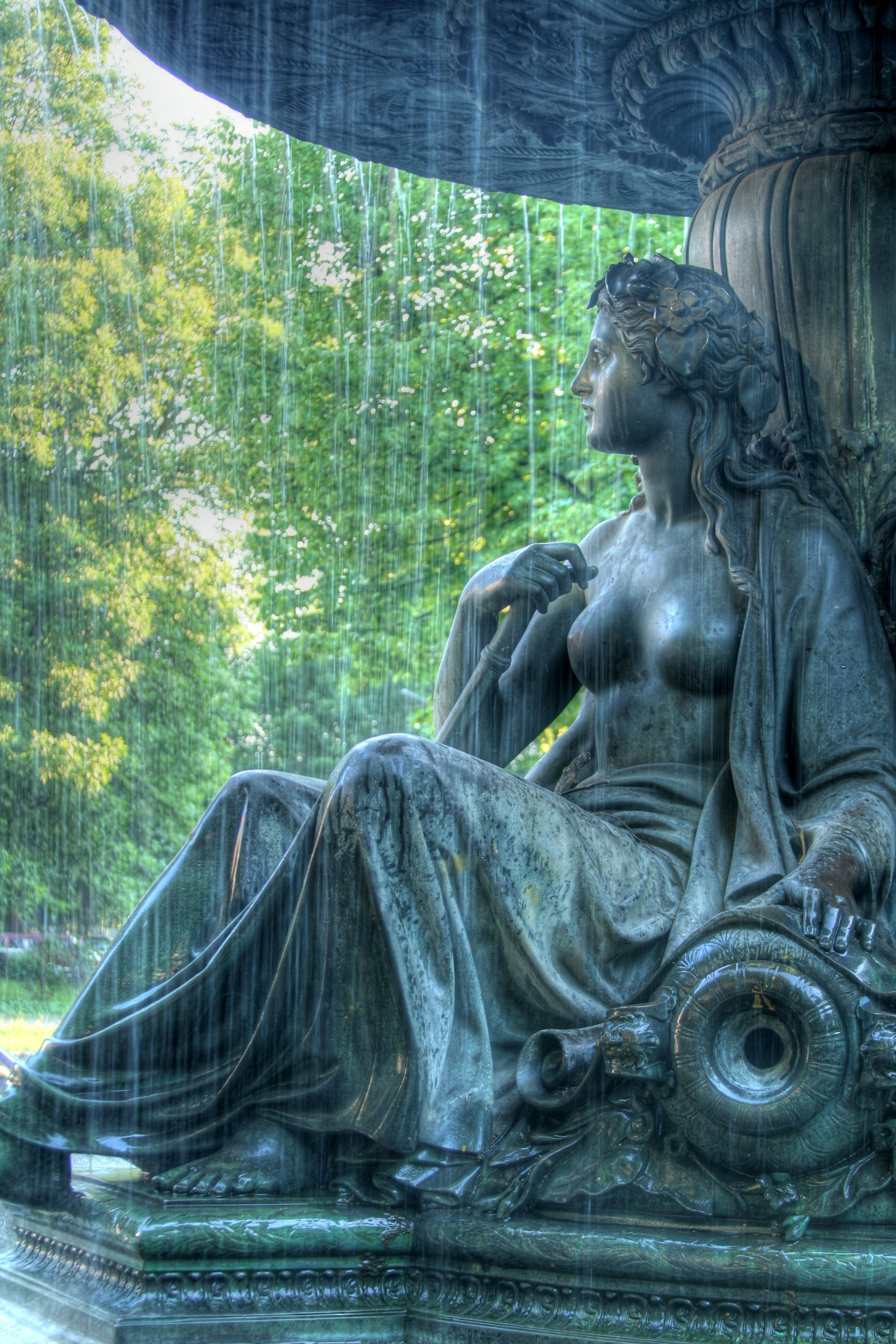
Allegorical figure representing the Elbe River, on the Wrangelbrunnen.

Hugo Hagen (1818 – 14 April 1871) was a German sculptor.

== Life ==
Hagen was born in 1818.

He was a student of Ludwig Wilhelm Wichmann. From 1842 to 1857, he was an assistant in the studios of Christian Daniel Rauch, where he contributed to creating the statues of Frederick the Great on the Unter den Linden, Albrecht Thaer at Humboldt University and Immanuel Kant in Königsberg. In 1865, he became the Director of the "Rauch-Museum". After the early death of Hermann Schievelbein, he helped complete the monument to Heinrich Friedrich Karl vom Stein. He also assisted Rudolf Siemering to complete Johann Gottfried Schadow's "Münzfrieses" (Coin Friezes) on the Old Berlin Mint.

Hagen died 14 April 1871 in Berlin, Germany. Many of his own works were left incomplete when he died. Throughout his career, Hagen was closely associated with the Berlin school of sculpture, contributing to some of the most significant public monuments of 19th-century Prussia.

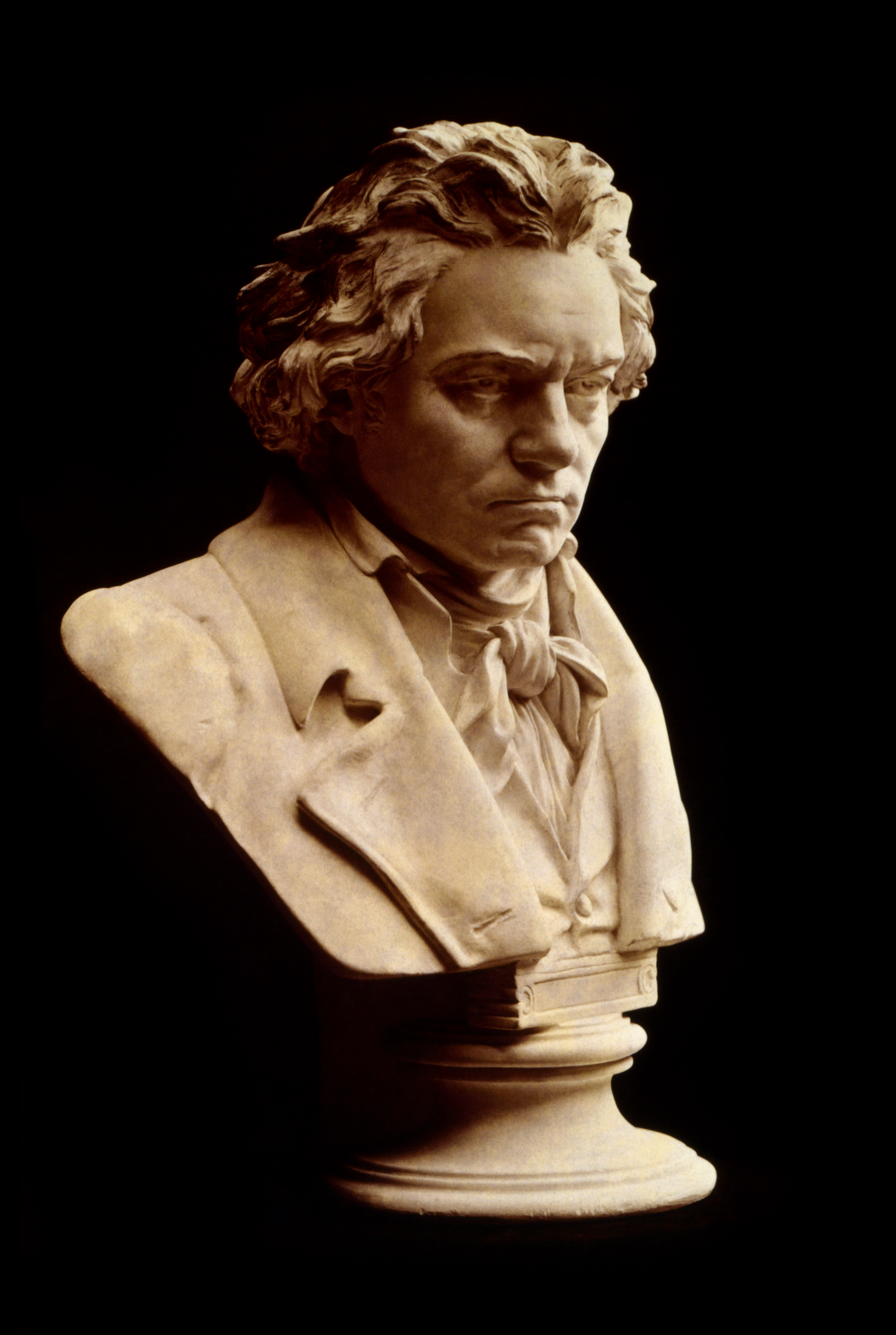
Bust of Beethoven

== Selected major works ==
- 1860/1861: Group, "Grace with Pegasus", on the roof of the Altes Museum
- 1862: Monument for Friedrich Wilhelm, Count Brandenburg on the Leipziger Platz
- 1866/1869: Johann Gottfried Schadow Monument on the porch of the Altes Museum
- 1866/1869: Powerscourt Estate, County Wicklow, Ireland. Two winged horses for the "Triton Lake" and allegorical figures of "Fame" and "Victory", after designs by Rauch.
- 1866: "Wrangelbrunnen" (fountain), in honor of Field Marshal Friedrich von Wrangel. The fountain wasn't completed and installed until 1877. Originally on the Kemperplatz, it is now at the corner of Urbanstraße and Grimmstraße in Berlin-Kreuzberg.

== Sources ==
- Peter Bloch: Bildwerke 1780-1910, Berlin, Staatliche Museen Preussischer Kulturbesitz, 1990
- Ethos und Pathos. Die Berliner Bildhauerschule 1786-1914, Exhibition Catalog, by Peter Bloch, Sibylle Einholz und Jutta von Simson. Berlin, Mann, 1990 ISBN 3-7861-1597-4
- J. Kuhn: Hagen, Hugo. In: Allgemeines Künstlerlexikon. Die Bildenden Künstler aller Zeiten und Völker (AKL). Vol.67, de Gruyter, Berlin 2010, ISBN 978-3-598-23034-9, pgs.422–424
