= Concert Grove =

Section of Prospect Park in New York City

Coordinates: 40°39′33″N 73°57′51″W

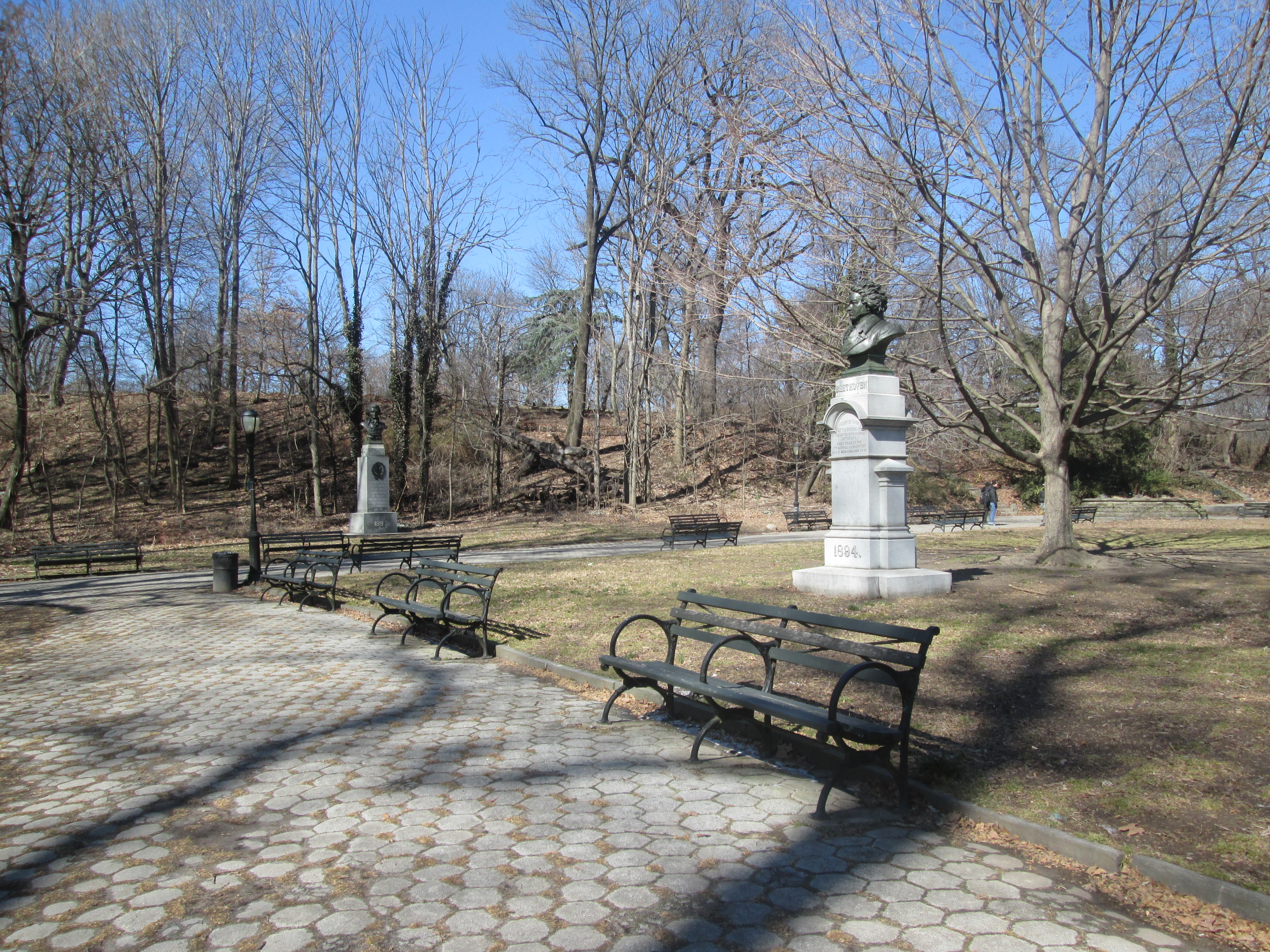
Concert Grove, with two of its busts of composers

The Concert Grove is a section of Prospect Park, Brooklyn, New York City, that historically functioned as an outdoor music venue. It still serves as a sculpture garden lined with busts of musical figures, largely put up by German American Sängerfest participants and other cultural groups. The Concert Grove also includes the Concert Grove Pavilion, formerly known as the Oriental Pavilion, and adjoins a Lincoln sculpture facing the lake.

== History and design ==
Map of notable buildings and structures at Prospect Park (note: not all entrances shown). Click on points for more details.
'"`UNIQ--templatestyles-00000001-QINU`"''"`UNIQ--templatestyles-00000002-QINU`"'

The Concert Grove is located on the northeast edge of the Prospect Park Lake, featuring a terrace garden above an esplanade. Originally completed in 1874 in a design by Frederick Law Olmsted and Calvert Vaux, with the assistance of Jacob Wrey Mould and Thomas Wisedell, it was laid out so park patrons could hear music being played from a bandstand on the later-demolished Music Island. The audience was expected to enjoy the outdoor setting and walk around during intermissions, in the style of a promenade concert. The Concert Grove served as the "artistic center" for Prospect Park, and in the 19th century, hosted German choral groups. However, as the area was considered to have had bad acoustics, concerts were moved to the nearby Music Pagoda in the Nethermead section of Prospect Park when that structure opened in 1887. After this, the Concert Grove became known for a period as the Flower Garden.

The southern part of the Concert Grove was later modified to make way for an ice skating rink called Wollman Rink, which was approved in 1960 and opened the following year on the site of the Music Island. The grove was renovated in the 2010s, which also saw the opening of the Shelby White and Leon Levy Esplanade and the island restored as Chaim Baier Music Island, with the demolition of the rink and the construction of the LeFrak Center, a year-round sports facility.

The grove's style complements that of the Central Park Mall; however, unlike the elongated, rectangular Mall, the Concert Grove was laid out radially, in order to blend more smoothly with the landscape. The design can also be compared to aspects of Bethesda Terrace, another Vaux and Mould collaboration. It consists of two pathways fanning outward, away from the lake, as well as a pedestrian walkway running through the middle of the grove. Two curved terraces, paralleling the shoreline and running perpendicularly to the spokes of the "fan", divide the grove into plateaus. A path runs southward from the Concert Grove to the LeFrak Center.

== Structures ==
=== Pavilion ===
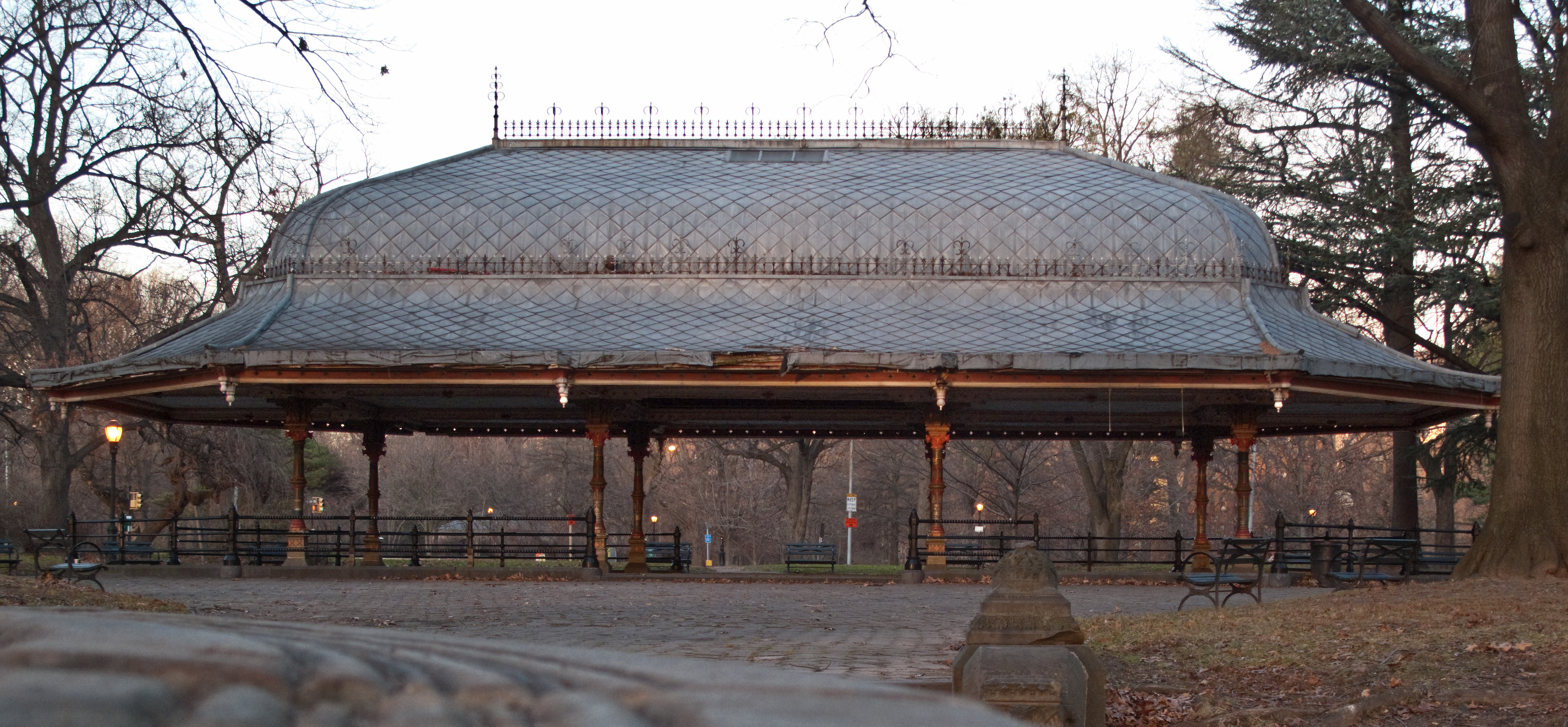
Concert Grove Pavilion, formerly known as the Oriental Pavilion

The Concert Grove Pavilion, also known as the Oriental Pavilion, is located in the middle of the Concert Grove, measuring 40 by 80 feet (12 by 24 m) with a roof and columns in a Middle Eastern or Indian style. The pavilion is supported by eight columns made of cast iron. The orientalist style could be considered a kind of Indo-Gothic, and may have been influenced by then-current British ideas of Vaux's early apprenticeship under Lewis Nockalls Cottingham or by his collaborator Jacob Wrey Mould.

Formerly a table service restaurant, it was converted to a snack bar in the 1950s after the closure of the Concert Grove House. The pavilion was largely destroyed in a 1974 fire, only the pillars surviving, and was reconstructed in 1987, though restoration work was temporarily halted after a contractor died on site. Everything was based on historic photographs and analysis of the destroyed structure, as original plans were lost. It proved difficult to identify the original colors from the old black-and-white images, and the palette was inspired by Vaux's Samuel J. Tilden House. The pavilion deteriorated after that, though plans to restore the pavilion were revealed in 2015. It has been very occasionally used for events in recent years, such as Shakespeare performances, as well as for weddings. It was again restored in 2021, and a design flaw from 1987 that led to water damage was corrected.

=== Statues ===
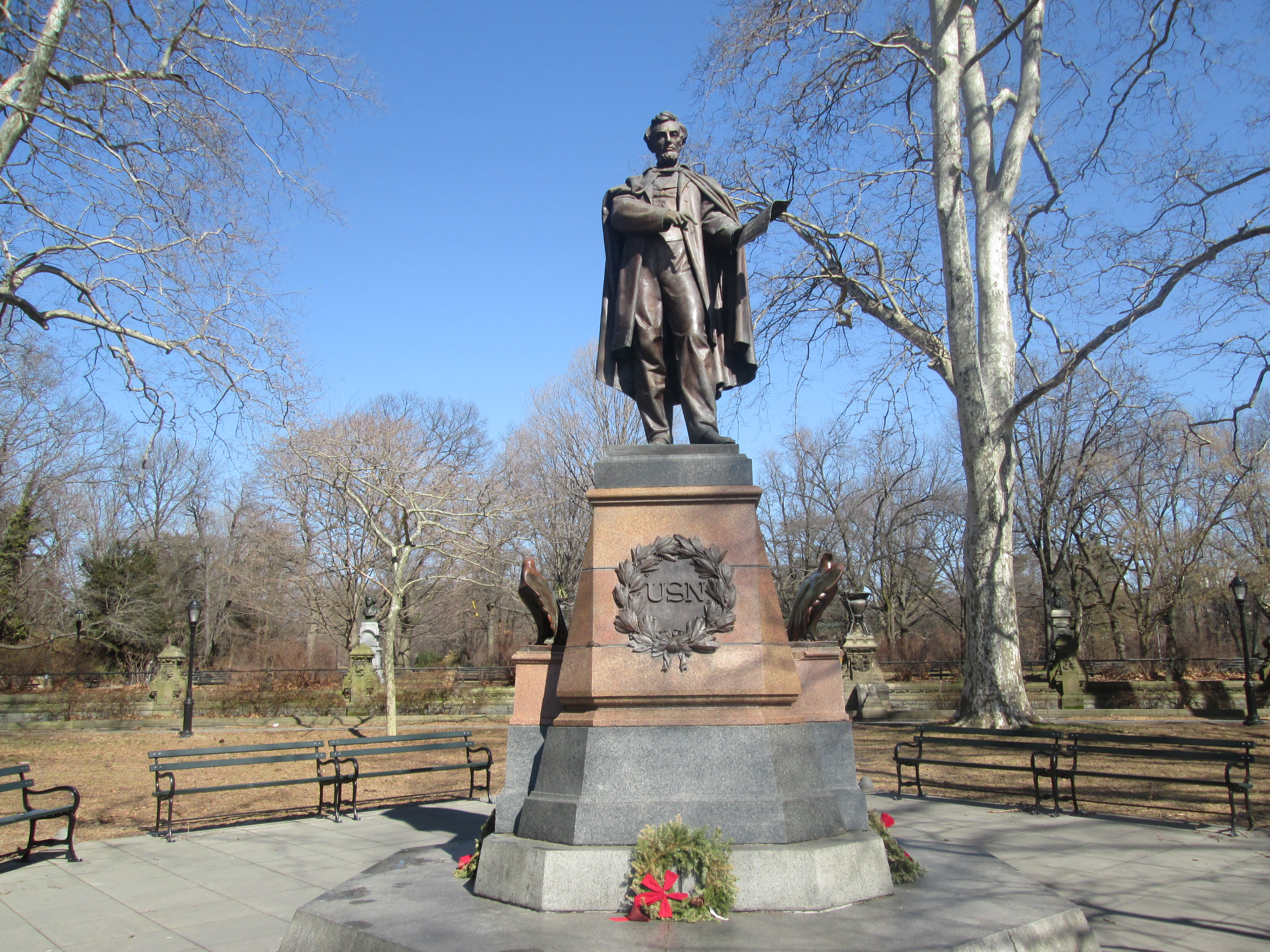
Lincoln statue

The first of six busts of creative figures in this park section was erected before the completion of the site, and just outside it. The bust of American writer Washington Irving (1871) across East Drive from the Concert Grove, was donated by Demas Barnes. The first inside the grove itself was the bust of Irish poet and lyricist Thomas Moore (1879), donated by the St. Patrick Society of Brooklyn.

Moore's bust helped establish a definite musical theme to the sculpture garden, and later busts are of classical composers, sponsored by other European American cultural groups. The later busts include three donated by the United German Singers of Brooklyn representing their wins in national Sängerfests: Ludwig van Beethoven (1894, one of a series by Bearer), Wolfgang Amadeus Mozart (1897), and Carl Maria von Weber (1909). And the last one to be added was donated by the Norwegian Societies of Brooklyn, Edvard Grieg (1914).

A statue of Abraham Lincoln, the first Lincoln monument in the United States, is also located at the Concert Grove. Sculpted by Henry Kirke Brown in 1869, it was initially located at Grand Army Plaza. The Lincoln statue was relocated to the Concert Grove in 1896, and restored in the late 1980s. Another restoration of the Lincoln statue took place in 1998. From 1959 until the early 2010s the statue faced the rear fence of the Kate Wollman Skating Rink. Following the Concert Grove restoration and closure of the rink it now faces the edge of the Prospect Park Lake. It was proposed to move the statue back to its original position as part of the restoration, replacing the bust of Alexander Skene at Grand Army Plaza, but as of 2021, it was still located in the Concert Grove.

=== Wall ===
A long low wall of Mary's Point Red sandstone partially surrounds the Concert Grove, with ornate sculptural decoration by Jacob Wrey Mould. A part of the original construction in 1874, it was intended to mark a place for the hitching of carriages. It later become prominent in the local running community as a starting line for circuits around the park, and a 1995 restoration named it "Harry's Wall" after a founder of the Prospect Park Track Club, funded by the Prospect Park Alliance, New York Road Runners, and friends of Harry Murphy.

=== Former structures ===
A frame chalet called the Concert Grove House was located north of the grove. It was completed in 1873 and contained a similar design to The Dairy, a now-demolished stone cottage, though the Concert Grove House was a frame building. The Concert Grove House served as a restaurant before being demolished in 1949. Restrooms were also provided within the building.
