= Alexander Skene =

American gynecologist and sculptor (1837–1900)

Alexander J. C. Skene
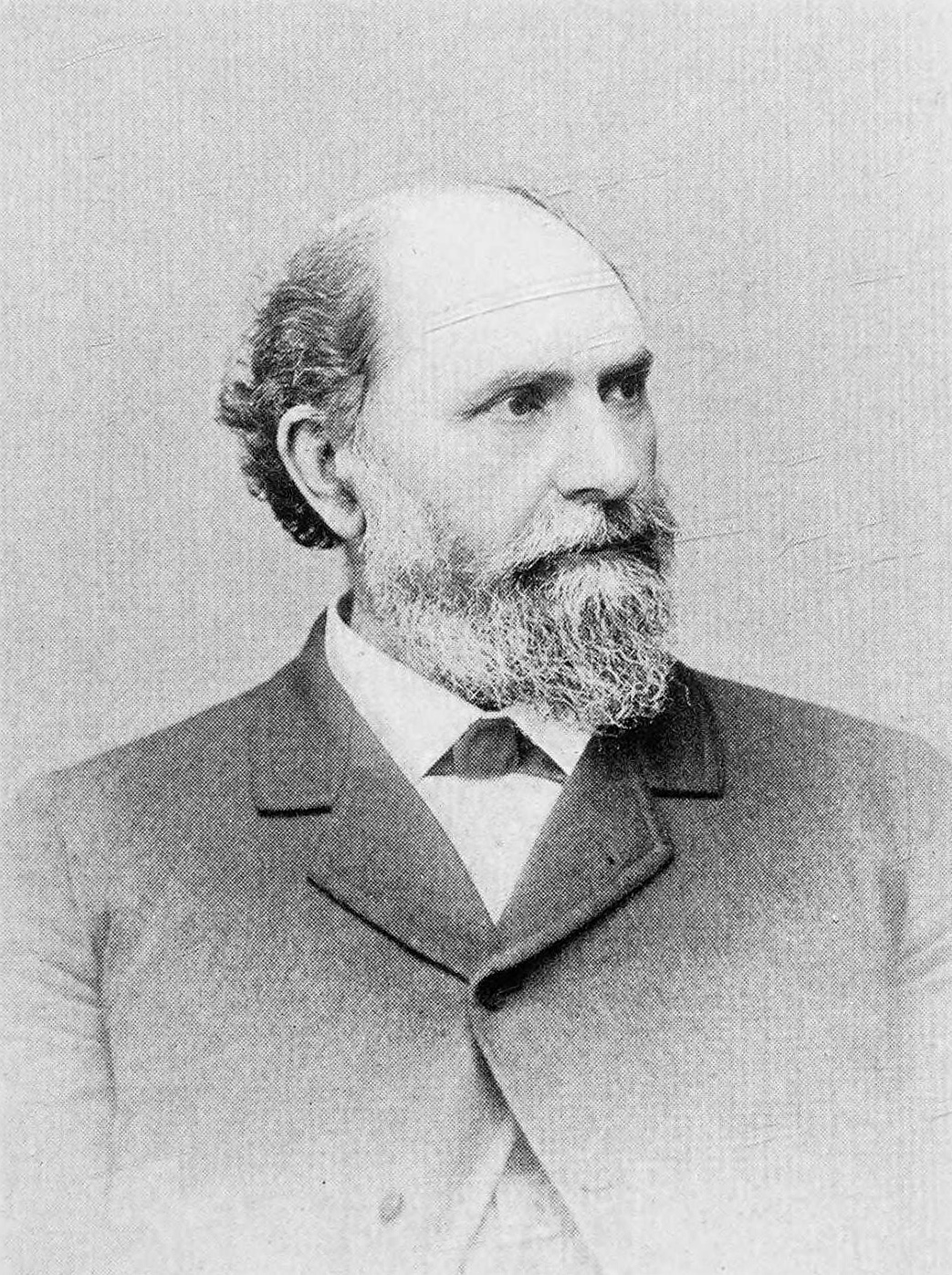
- Born: June 17, 1837; Fyvie, Scotland
- Died: July 4, 1900 (aged 63); Catskills, New York, United States
- Education: University of Toronto Faculty of Medicine; University of Michigan; Long Island College Hospital
- Occupation: Gynecologist
- Years active: 1863–1900
- Known for: co-founder of American Gynecological Society; founder of International Congress of Gynecology and Obstetrics; first modern description of the paraurethral glands (Note: The paraurethral glands were originally described by Reinier de Graaf in 1672. They were named after Skene for his more detailed anatomical characterisations and emphasis upon their clinical importance, which became the reference point for later clinicians.)
- Medical career
- Field: Obstetrics and gynecology
- Research: Gynecology
- Notable works: Treatise on the Diseases of Women: For the Use of Students and Practitioners (1888)

Alexander Johnston Chalmers Skene (/skiːn/; 17 June 1837 – 4 July 1900) was a prominent British-American gynecologist who made the first modern description of what would later become known as Skene's glands.

== Biography ==
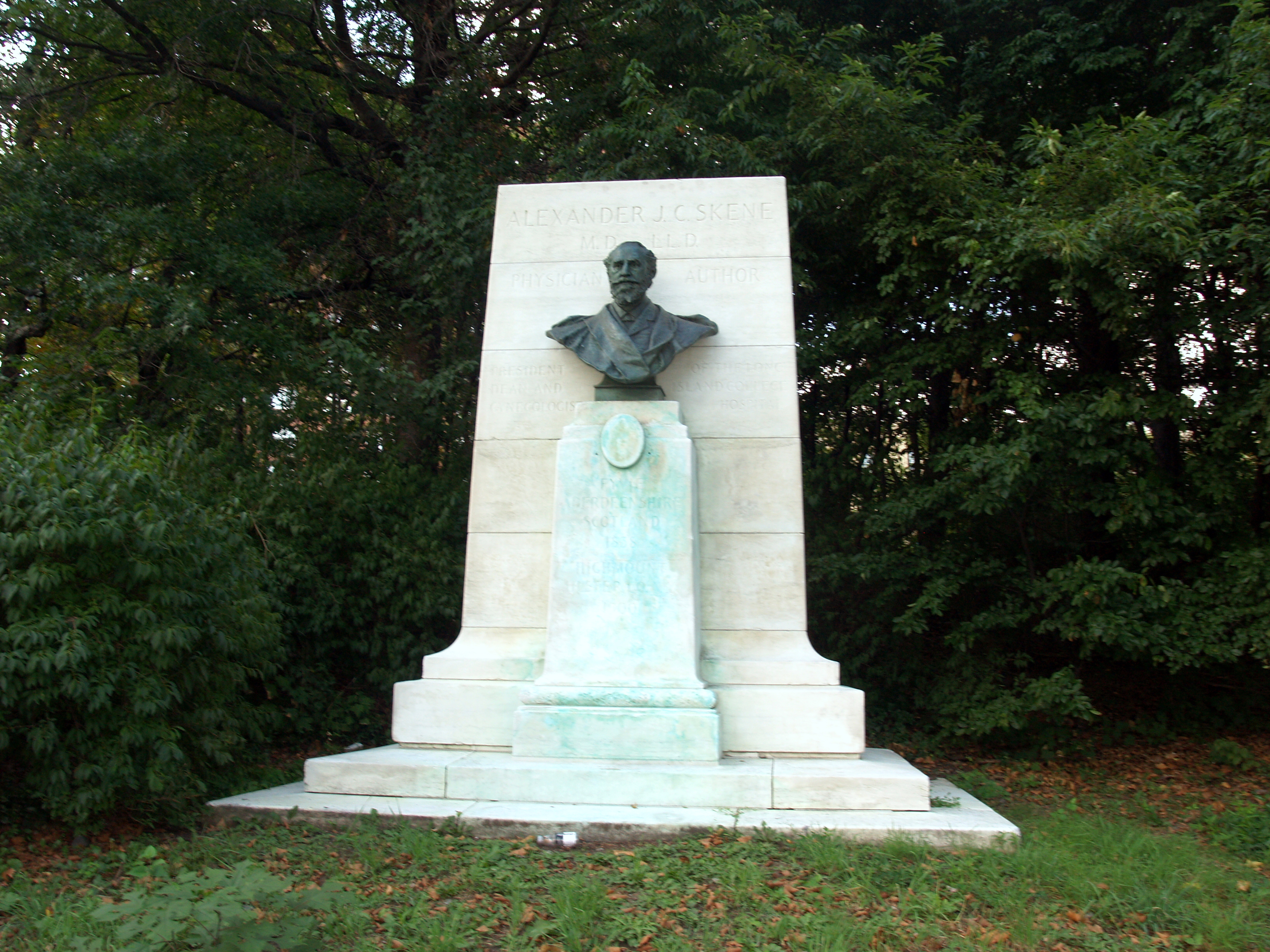
Memorial to Skene in Grand Army Plaza

Skene was born in Fyvie, Scotland, on 17 June 1837. At the age of 19, he went to North America. He studied medicine at King's College (now the University of Toronto), then at the University of Michigan, and finally at the Long Island College Hospital (now the State University of New York Downstate Medical Center) in Brooklyn graduating in 1863. From July 1863 until June 1864, he was acting assistant surgeon in the Union Army, after which he entered private practice in Brooklyn and advanced to become Professor of Disease of Women at Long Island College Hospital. He was professor of gynecology in the post-graduate Medical School of New York in 1884, and was president of the American Gynecological Society.

Skene wrote over 100 medical articles and several textbooks. He contributed many surgical instruments and improved on surgical techniques. He performed the first successful operation of gastro-elytrotomy that is recorded, and also that of craniotomy, using Sims's speculum. Primarily, he is remembered for his description of the Skene's glands at the floor of the urethra. He also described their infection—skenitis. Skene collaborated with J. Marion Sims, who performed gynecologic exams and surgeries on enslaved African-American women without anesthesia, but Skene does not appear to be part of these experiments.

As a sculptor, Skene created a bust of Sims which is on display in the lobby of the Kings County Medical Society. A bust honoring Skene is located in Prospect Park Plaza (also known as Grand Army Plaza). This statue was proposed to be moved in 2011 to accommodate a statue of former U.S. president Abraham Lincoln, but this did not happen.

Skene died in his summerhouse in the Catskills, New York, on 4 July 1900. He left behind a son, Jonathan Bowers. He is buried at Rockland Cemetery in Sparkill, NY.

== Works ==
- Uro-Cystic and Urethral Diseases in Women (New York, 1877)
- Treatise on Diseases of Women: For the Use of Students and Practitioners (1888)
