= Equestrian statue of Henry Warner Slocum =

Equestrian statue in Brooklyn, New York, U.S.

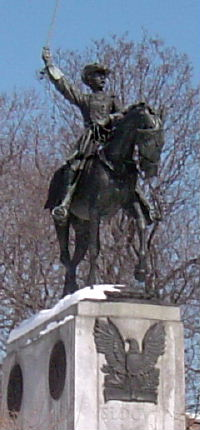
- The statue in 2007
- Interactive map of Equestrian statue of Henry Warner Slocum
- Location: Grand Army Plaza, Brooklyn, New York City, New York, United States
- Coordinates: 40.6734°N 73.9691°W
- Designer: Frederick William MacMonnies (sculptor); Stanford White (architect)
- Type: Equestrian statue
- Material: Bronze; Granite (pedestal)
- Length: 18.33 feet (5.59 m)
- Width: 10.5 feet (3.2 m)
- Height: 29 feet (8.8 m)
- Dedicated date: May 30, 1905
- Dedicated to: Henry Warner Slocum

The equestrian statue of Henry Warner Slocum is a monumental statue in Brooklyn's Grand Army Plaza, in New York City. The equestrian statue, designed by sculptor Frederick William MacMonnies, was dedicated in 1905 in honor of Henry Warner Slocum, who served as a general in the Union Army during the American Civil War and later as a U.S. representative from the state of New York.

== History ==
=== Background ===
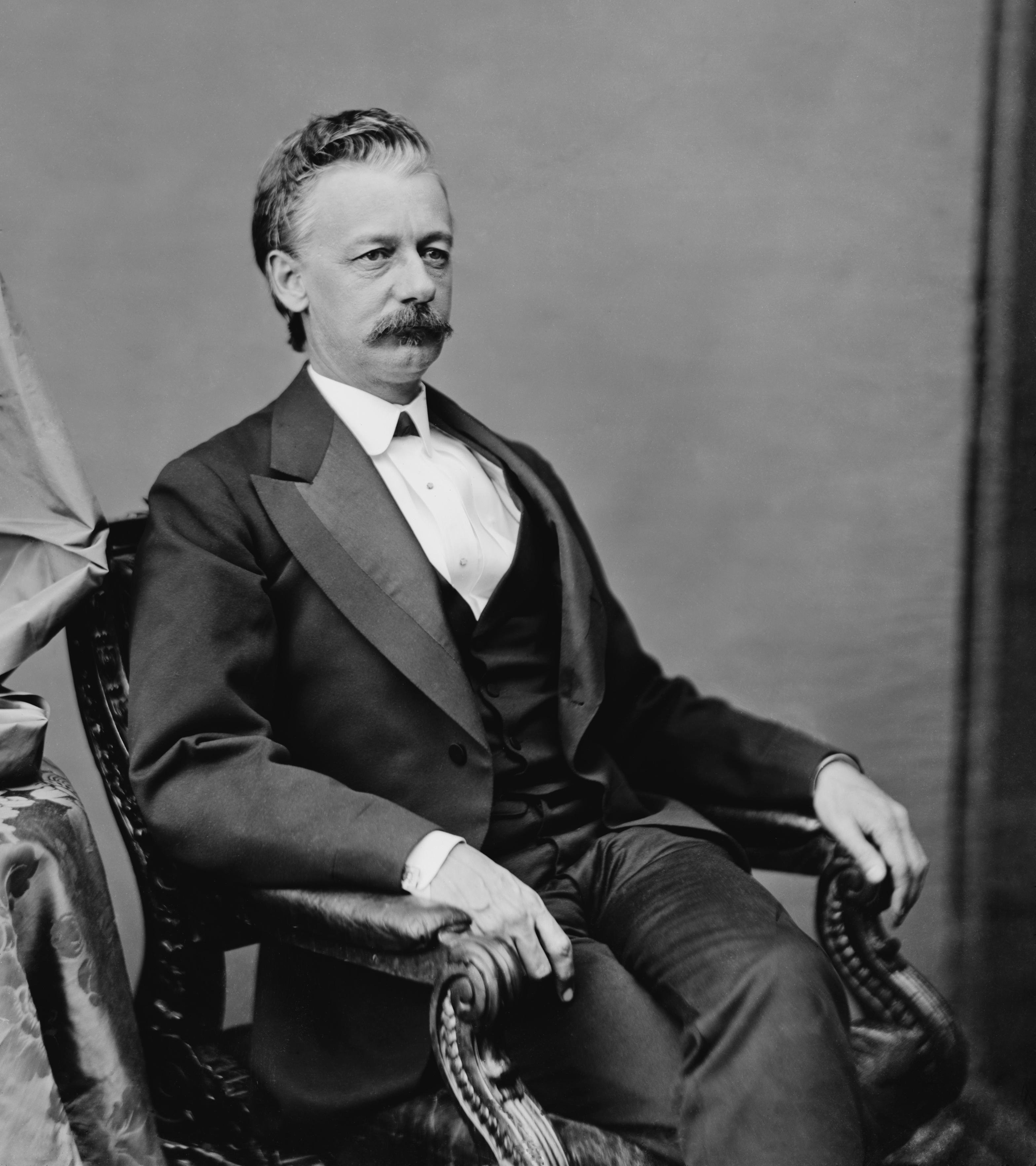
Henry Warner Slocum

Henry Warner Slocum was born in Delphi Falls, New York in 1826. After attending the Cazenovia Seminary and the State Normal School at Albany, he enrolled in the United States Military Academy in 1848. Graduating four years later, he would go on to serve as an officer in the United States Army until the 1850s, when he resigned to practice law and participate in local and state politics. At the outbreak of the American Civil War in 1861, he resumed his military career and served as an officer in the Union Army, rising to the rank of major general by the end of the war. He participated in several major battles, including the First Battle of Bull Run, the Battle of Gaines' Mill, and the Battle of Gettysburg. Following the war, he moved to Brooklyn, New York, where he served several terms as a member of the United States House of Representatives. He died in 1894 in New York City.

=== Creation ===
Following his death, several Brooklynites began to organize efforts to erect a monument in the city in his honor, with the location of the monument to be determined by the municipal authorities. While planned to initially be funded through donations, it was soon decided that public funds would be used. In 1895, the city government of Brooklyn passed a law allocating funds to the erection of the statue, the cost of which was not to exceed $30,000. American sculptor Frederick William MacMonnies, who at the time was operating out of Paris, was contracted to design the statue. He completed the casting of the statue by 1900, and the statue was shipped to Brooklyn in 1902. However, the statue was kept in storage for some time as the pedestal and foundation were being prepared. The pedestal was designed by architect Stanford White, with the location of the monument being the intersection of Eastern Parkway and Bedford Avenue.

=== Dedication ===
The monument's dedication ceremony occurred on Memorial Day, May 30, 1905. The largescale ceremony commenced with a playing of the song "Hail, Columbia", followed by an invocation by Bishop Frederick Burgess of the Episcopal Diocese of Long Island. Park commissioner Michael J. Kennedy then presented the statue, which was unveiled by the 6-year-old granddaughter of Slocum. The statue was then accepted by New York City Mayor George B. McClellan Jr. on behalf of the city of New York. "The Star-Spangled Banner" was then played before a keynote speech was given by President of the United States Theodore Roosevelt. A benediction was then given by Bishop Charles Edward McDonnell of the Roman Catholic Diocese of Brooklyn. The ceremony ended with a playing of "America", followed by a gun salute. A parade followed down the parkway, with Roosevelt reviewing it.

In 1924, the monument was moved to the intersection of 15th Street and Prospect Park West, and was again moved to its current location at Grand Army Plaza in 1928.

== Design ==
The monument consists of a bronze equestrian statue atop a granite pedestal. On either side of the pedestal are two large bronze medallions, while a bronze eagle with outstretched wings is affixed to the front. Slocum, holding a sword upward, faces to the right. The only inscription on the pedestal is the name "SLOCUM". According to the New York City Department of Parks and Recreation, the monument's pedestal measures approximately 12 feet (3.7 m) tall and covers an area of approximately 10.5 feet (3.2 m) by 18.33 feet (5.59 m). The statue itself stands an additional 17 feet (5.2 m) atop the pedestal. While initially facing west from the intersection of Eastern Parkway and Beford Avenue, the monument now stands at Grand Army Plaza, east of the Soldiers' and Sailors' Arch, near East Plaza Street, where it faces towards Central Library.

Art historian Kathryn Greenthal compares the "dramatic image" of Slocum raising his sword triumphantly to similar equestrian statues of the time, including Augustus Saint-Gaudens's General John Logan Memorial (dedicated in 1897). She claims that these statues are in the "European tradition" of such statues as Carlo Marochetti's Richard Coeur de Lion and Emmanuel Frémiet's Jeanne d'Arc.

== See also ==
- 1905 in art
- List of equestrian statues in the United States

== Bibliography ==
- Greenthal, Kathryn (1985). Augustus Saint-Gaudens, Master Sculptor. Metropolitan Museum of Art. ISBN 978-0-87099-437-1 – via Google Books.
- Hartwig, D. Scott (February 2000). Slocum, Henry Warner (1826-1894), soldier and lawyer. Oxford University Press. doi:10.1093/anb/9780198606697.article.0500721. ISBN 978-0-19-860669-7. Archived from the original on July 27, 2020.
- Morrone, Francis (2001). An Architectural Guidebook to Brooklyn. Photography by James Iska. Gibbs Smith. ISBN 978-1-4236-1911-6 – via Google Books.
- Catalogue of the Works of Art Belonging to the City of New York. New York City Art Commission. Gilliss Press. 1909 – via Google Books.
- "Various Topics". Public Opinion. XXIX (17): 534. October 25, 1900 – via Google Books.
- Rider, Fremont (1916). Rider's New York City. Henry Holt and Company – via Google Books.
- Saltus, J. Sanford; Tisné, Walter E. (1923). Statues of New York. G. P. Putnam's Sons – via Google Books.
- Slocum, Charles Elihu (1908). History of the Slocums, Slocumbs and Slocombs of America. Vol. II – via Google Books.
- Slocum, Charles Elihu (1913). The Life and Services of Major-General Henry Warner Slocum. The Slocum Publishing Company – via Google Books.
- Spellen, Suzanne (November 18, 2011). "Past and Present: General Slocum's Statue". Brownstoner Magazine. Archived from the original on March 26, 2020.
