= On Prospect Park =

Residential building in Brooklyn, New York

Coordinates: 40°40′24″N 73°58′06″W

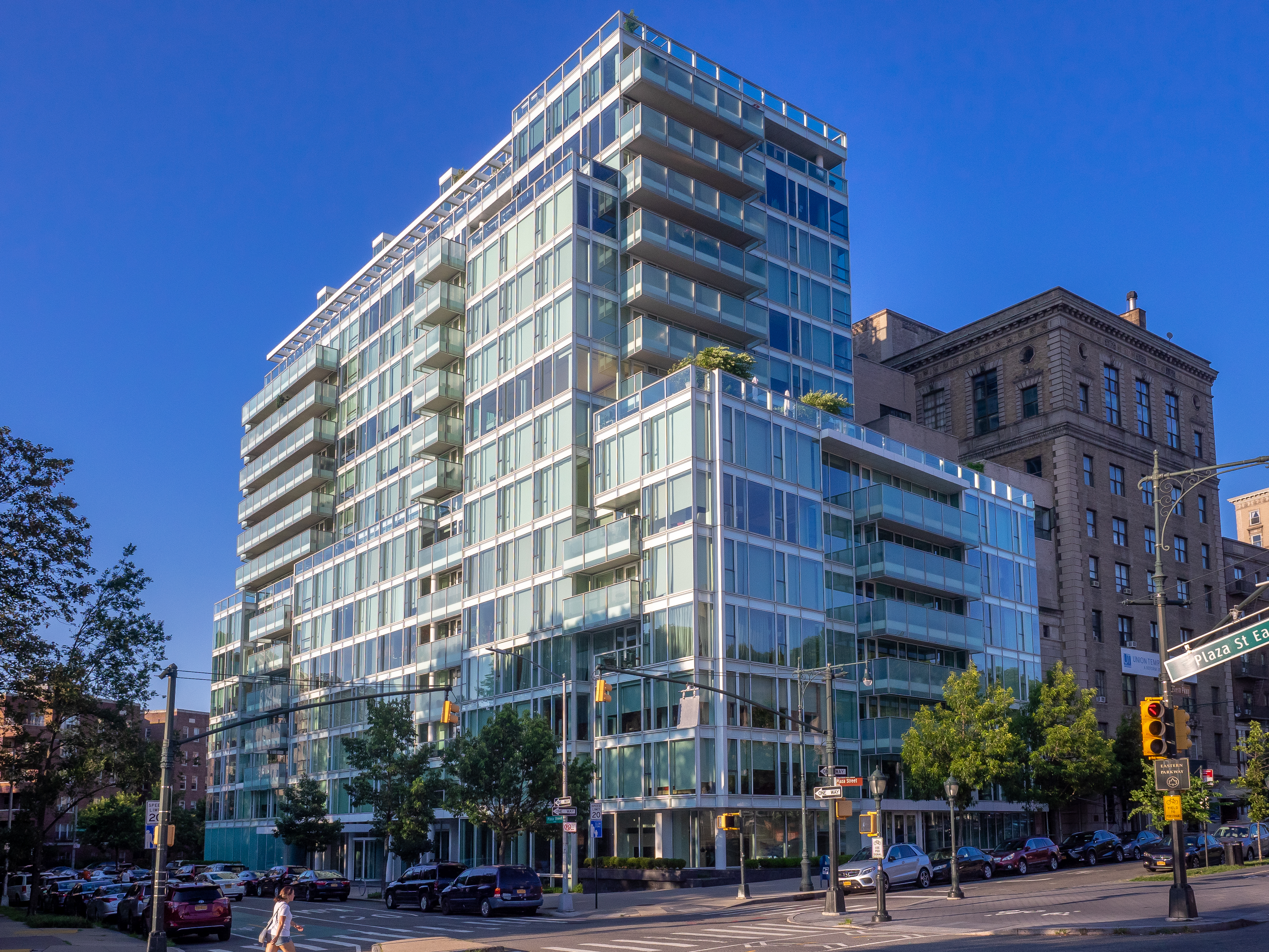
On Prospect Park

On Prospect Park is a condominium at 1 Grand Army Plaza in Brooklyn, New York City, designed by the noted architect Richard Meier. The building is an all-glass, modernist, luxury high-rise overlooking Prospect Park and Grand Army Plaza. The AIA Guide described the design as "a massive beached whale".
