= Soldiers' and Sailors' Arch =

Triumphal arch in Brooklyn, New York

- Soldiers' and Sailors' Monument
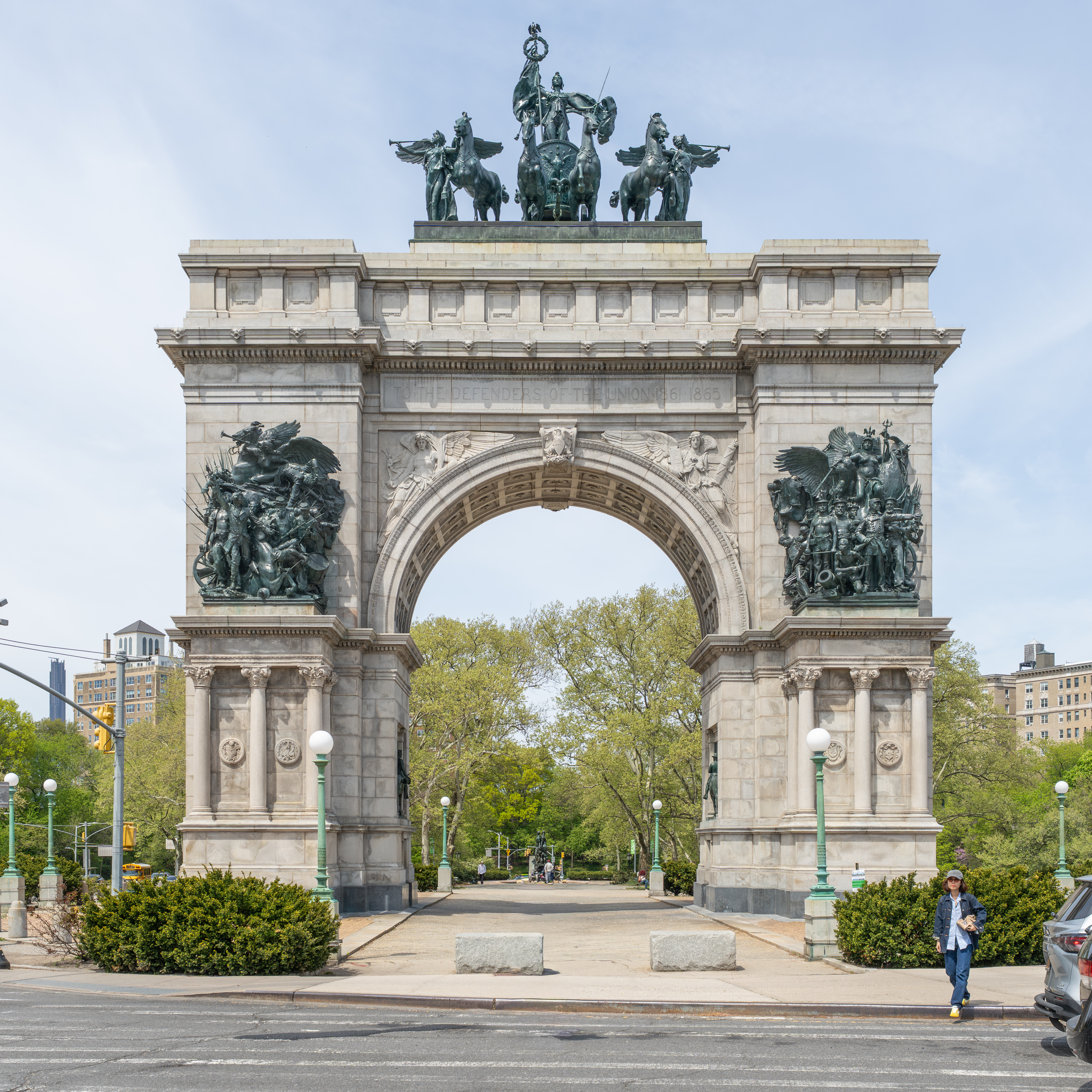
- The south face of the arch, as seen from the south end of Grand Army Plaza

- Soldiers' and Sailors' Arch location in Brooklyn
- 40°40′23″N 73°58′12″W
- Type: American Civil War Veterans memorial
- Location: Grand Army Plaza; Brooklyn, New York, U.S.

History
- Dedicated: October 21, 1892; 133 years ago
- Built: 1889–1892
- Built for: City of Brooklyn

Site notes
- Elevation: 135 ft (41 m)
- Height: 80 ft (24 m)
- Architect: John H. Duncan
- Sculptor: Frederick MacMonnies (sculptures), Philip Martiny (spandrels), Thomas Eakins and William Rudolf O'Donovan (bas-reliefs)
- Restored: 1980; 2023–2025
- Owner: City of New York
- Website: www.nycgovparks.org/parks/grand-army-plaza/monuments/1463

New York City Landmark
- Designated: October 16, 1973
- Reference no.: 0821

The Soldiers' and Sailors' Arch is a triumphal arch at Grand Army Plaza in Brooklyn, New York, United States. Designed by John Hemenway Duncan and built from 1889 to 1892, the arch commemorates American Civil War Union veterans. The monument is made of granite and measures 80 feet (24 m) tall, with an archway opening measuring 50 feet (15 m) tall and 35 feet (11 m) wide. The arch also includes spandrels by Philip Martiny, equestrian bas-reliefs by Thomas Eakins and William Rudolf O'Donovan, and three sculptural groups by Frederick MacMonnies. It is one of New York City's three major triumphal arches.

The lowest portion of the arch is made of darker granite from Quincy, Massachusetts, above which is lighter-colored granite. There are four pedestals, two each facing north and south; the northern pedestals are empty, while the southern pedestals contain sculptural groups by MacMonnies, depicting the United States Army and United States Navy. The bas-reliefs within the archway opening depict Abraham Lincoln and Ulysses S. Grant on horseback, and the archway opening has a coffered ceiling. The spandrels above the arch contain representations of victory, as well as the seals of New York state and Brooklyn. On the roof is an observation deck and a quadriga, also designed by MacMonnies. Inside are stairways to the observation deck, as well as a room just beneath the roof.

After the Civil War, the then-independent city of Brooklyn planned a grand memorial to Union Army soldiers, though no major monument was built for two decades. The arch was proposed in 1888, and Duncan was selected as the arch's designer following an architectural design competition. The cornerstone of the arch was laid on October 30, 1889, and the arch was dedicated on October 21, 1892. Additional art was installed over the following decade. The arch was used for various events during the 20th century and was designated as a New York City landmark in 1973. The arch and its sculptures have been renovated several times over the years, including in 1980 and 2023–2025.

== Description ==
The Soldiers' and Sailors' Arch is at the southern end of Grand Army Plaza in Brooklyn, New York City, U.S., just north of the entrance to Prospect Park. Designed by John H. Duncan and completed in 1892, the arch was built as an American Civil War memorial. It is one of New York City's three major triumphal arches, along with the Washington Square Arch and the Manhattan Bridge Arch and Colonnade. As built, the arch was surrounded by granite posts connected by a bronze chain.

Including abutments on either side of the archway opening, the arch measures 80 feet (24 m) tall, with a footprint of 80 by 50 feet (24 by 15 m). The interior of the arched opening is 50 feet tall and 35 feet (11 m) wide. At the top of the arch, the abutments narrow in thickness from 50 feet to 25 feet (7.6 m). (Note: During the arch's construction, contemporary media sources wrote that the structure was 71 feet (22 m) tall, 80 feet wide, and 45 feet (14 m) long. In addition, the archway opening was cited as 48.5 feet (14.8 m) tall by 37 feet (11 m) wide, and the abutments were cited as 26 feet (7.9 m) wide.) When the arch was completed, the top of the arch was around 225 feet (69 m) above sea level. Visitors originally could see as far as Long Island to the east, the Palisades to the north, the Atlantic Ocean and Atlantic Highlands to the south, and the Orange Mountains to the west.

=== Design ===
==== Exterior ====
At the base of either of the arch's abutments is a 3-foot-high (0.91 m) course of darker granite from Quincy, Massachusetts, above which is lighter-colored granite. There are four pedestals, two each facing north and south; these were intended to support groups of statues, although only the southern pedestals have statuary. Each pedestal has engaged columns, topped by capitals in the Composite order. The capitals contain motifs such as ships' bows, eagles, and the fruits of the land and sea. Between each set of columns, there are medallions depicting the insignia of various Army and Navy corps. The exteriors of the arch's base contain the seals of various military companies and regiments based in Brooklyn. The archway opening's keystones reportedly weigh 9 short tons (8.0 long tons; 8.2 t) and depict the Great Seal of the United States.

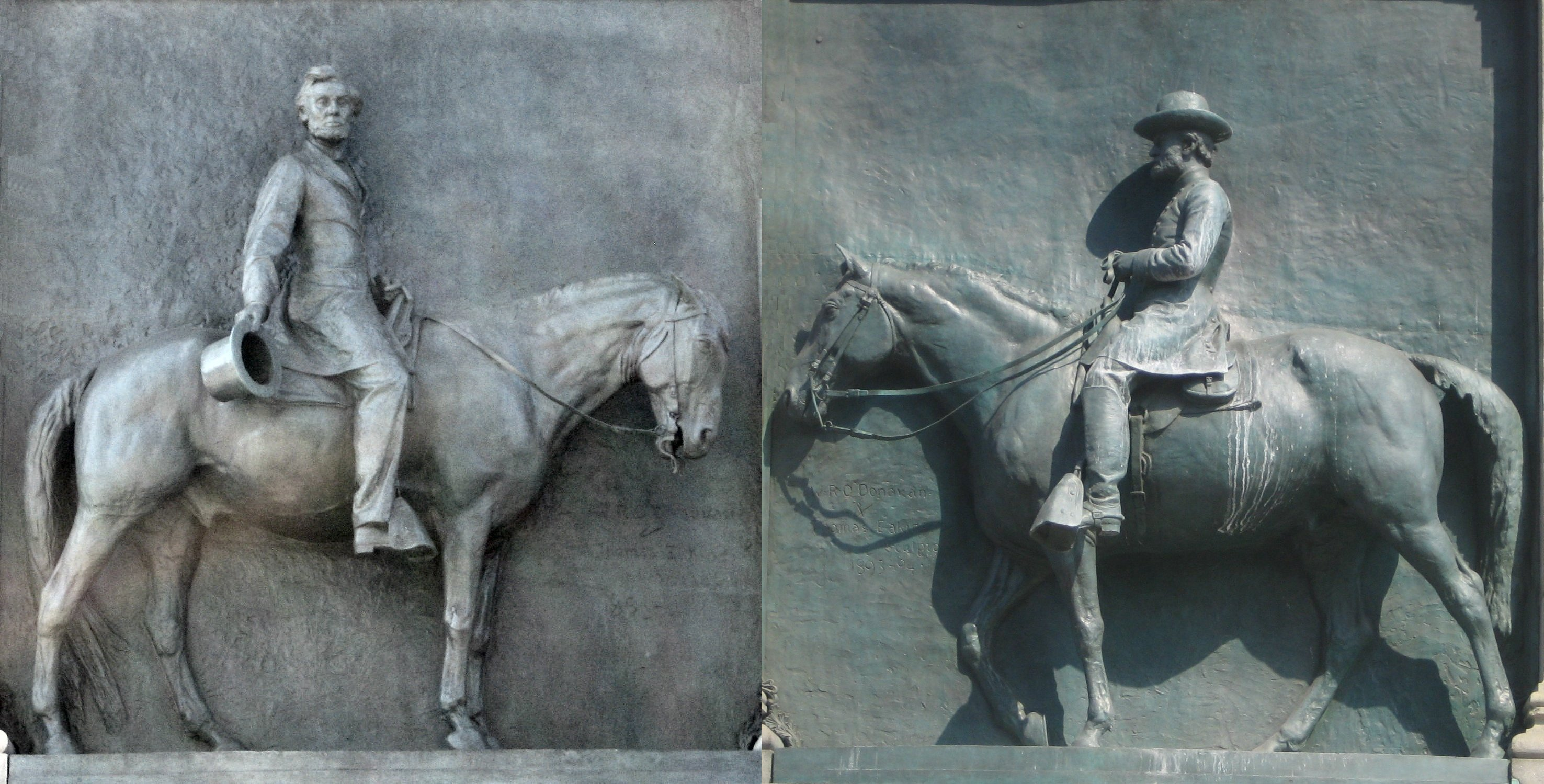
Lincoln and Grant bas-reliefs

The underside of the arched opening has a coffered ceiling, and there are rosettes at the center of each coffer. The interior walls of the archway opening have equestrian bas-reliefs of Abraham Lincoln and Ulysses S. Grant. The reliefs bear the dates 1893–1894, even though they were installed in 1895. Thomas Eakins designed the horses for each relief, and William Rudolf O'Donovan designed the riders. (Note: One source incorrectly attributes the bas-reliefs to Maurice J. Power.) The Lincoln relief is the only artwork in a New York City park where Lincoln is depicted on horseback, as well as one of two artworks of Lincoln on horseback that are known to exist. Beneath each equestrian relief, there are doorways in the abutments, which lead to the staircases.

Philip Martiny designed the spandrels on the structure's north and south facades, at the upper corners of the archway opening. Each spandrel reportedly weighs 14 short tons (13 long tons; 13 t). The spandrels on the structure's north facade contain the seals of the state of New York and the then-independent city of Brooklyn, (Note: Brooklyn became part of the City of Greater New York in 1898.) while the spandrels to the south depict female representations of victory. On the attic, along the arch's southern facade, is an inscription reading, "To the Defenders of the Union, 1861–1865"; this is the only inscription on the monument. The monument's attic includes panels with disks surrounded by wreaths. The names of battles were supposed to have been inscribed into the panels. The structure's parapet was to have globes with eagles resting above them, but the arch was instead built with a plain parapet.

==== Interior ====
The arch has two spiral stairways, one inside each abutment. One staircase was originally used by visitors traveling to the roof, while the other was used by visitors descending to ground level. The stairs have been variously cited as containing 103, 107, 108, or 116 steps. Each of the stairs is made of iron and is illuminated by LEDs underneath. In addition, there is a room within the monument's attic, above the archway opening, for a war museum or trophy room. The room, measuring 44 feet (13 m) long, was originally decorated with marble wainscoting and mosaic panels, and there were ceiling vaults with ornamentation honoring Civil War soldiers. Three glass-domed skylights illuminated the room. By the late 20th century, the room was an art exhibition space with little decoration.

==== Sculptures ====
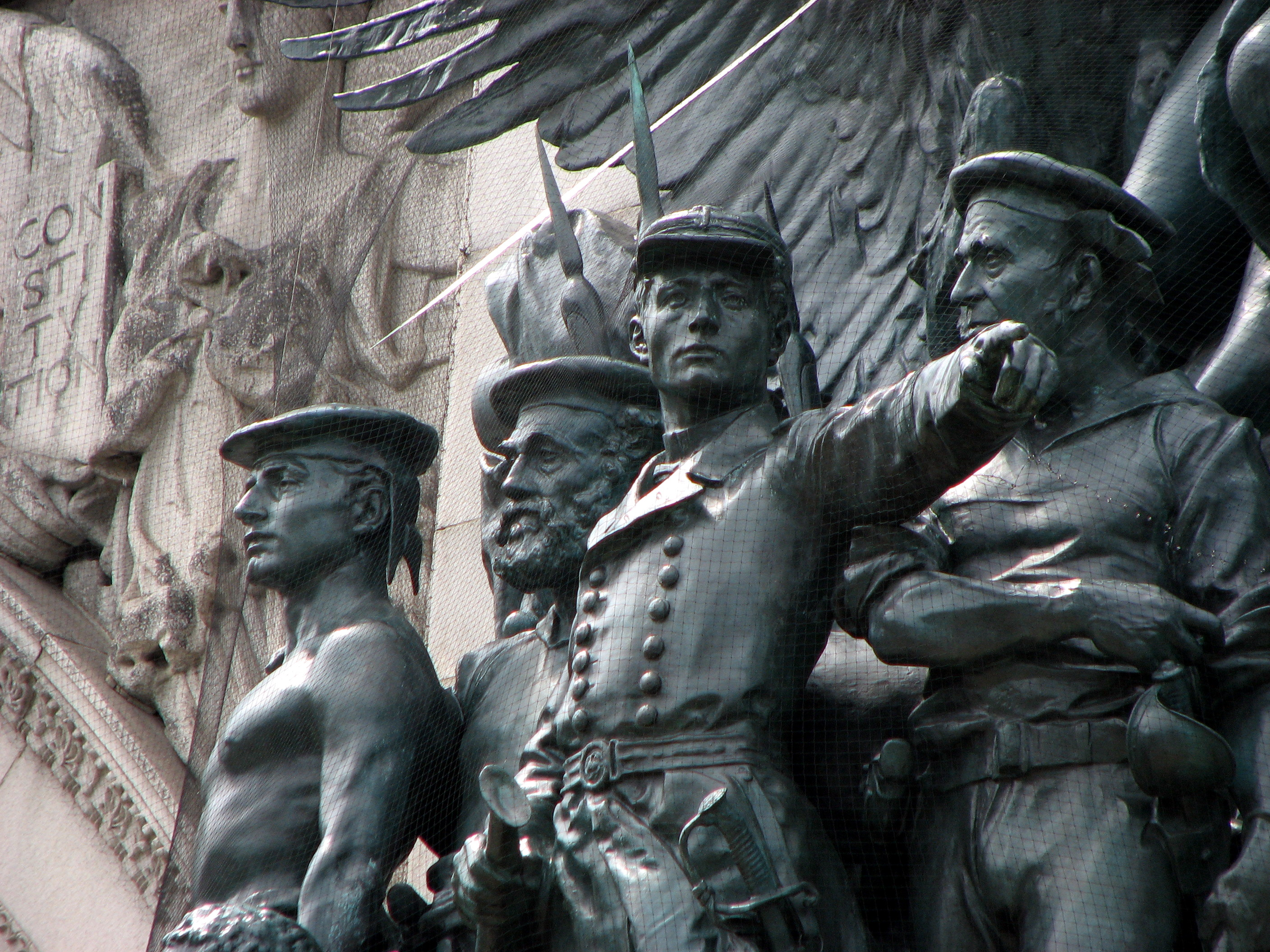
Close-up of the Navy sculptures, which are covered in netting

The sculptor Frederick MacMonnies was hired to design sculptures for the arch. On the top of the arch is a quadriga or four-horse chariot, atop which is a figure of Columbia, the female personification of the United States. The figure holds a sword in her left (non-dominant) hand, signifying peace, in addition to a flag topped by a wreath, signifying victory. The quadriga is 25 feet (7.6 m) tall and weighs 25 short tons (23 metric tons).

At ground level, MacMonnies also designed two bronze sculptural groups on the arch's southern facade, which represent the United States Army and United States Navy. The Army grouping includes a young officer surrounded by other soldiers, in addition to a Valkyrie-like figure. The Army statues were based on the painting Liberty Leading the People by Eugène Delacroix. The Navy grouping depicts a group of sailors pointing at a distant object; the sailors stand on a ship with a snapped mast, and there is a depiction of a nude goddess above them. The Navy grouping includes a depiction of a black sailor kneeling; at the time of the arch's completion, comparatively few monuments depicted black men.

There have been claims that the soldiers in the sculptures were modeled on French people. For example, the president of the Kings County Historical Society claimed in 1930 that the sculptures' uniforms were based on French soldiers' uniforms, while the caps are slightly different from those worn by Civil War veterans. MacMonnies refuted the claims, saying the figures were based upon Americans he saw in Paris. Specifically, the figures contain the faces of MacMonnies and his friends. One of the wounded figures depicts MacMonnies's former mentor, Augustus Saint-Gaudens. The sculptures were intended to honor "common soldiers", in contrast to other war memorials, which honored military leaders.

=== Temporary art ===
The arch has been used for temporary art installations, including exhibits by local artists in the late 20th century. During the 1980s, these included a multimedia exhibit, an equestrian-themed exhibit, a show with works themed to angels, a show based on classical architecture, and an exhibit about monuments and home goods. There were also exhibits in the 1990s, including works about civil wars, Ghanaian folk art, Nuyorican art, photos of Prospect Park, and a controversial multimedia piece depicting an assassination. Additionally, during the 2024 restoration of the Soldiers' and Sailors' Arch, a set of works by local contemporary artists was placed at the arch's base.

== Development ==
=== Planning ===
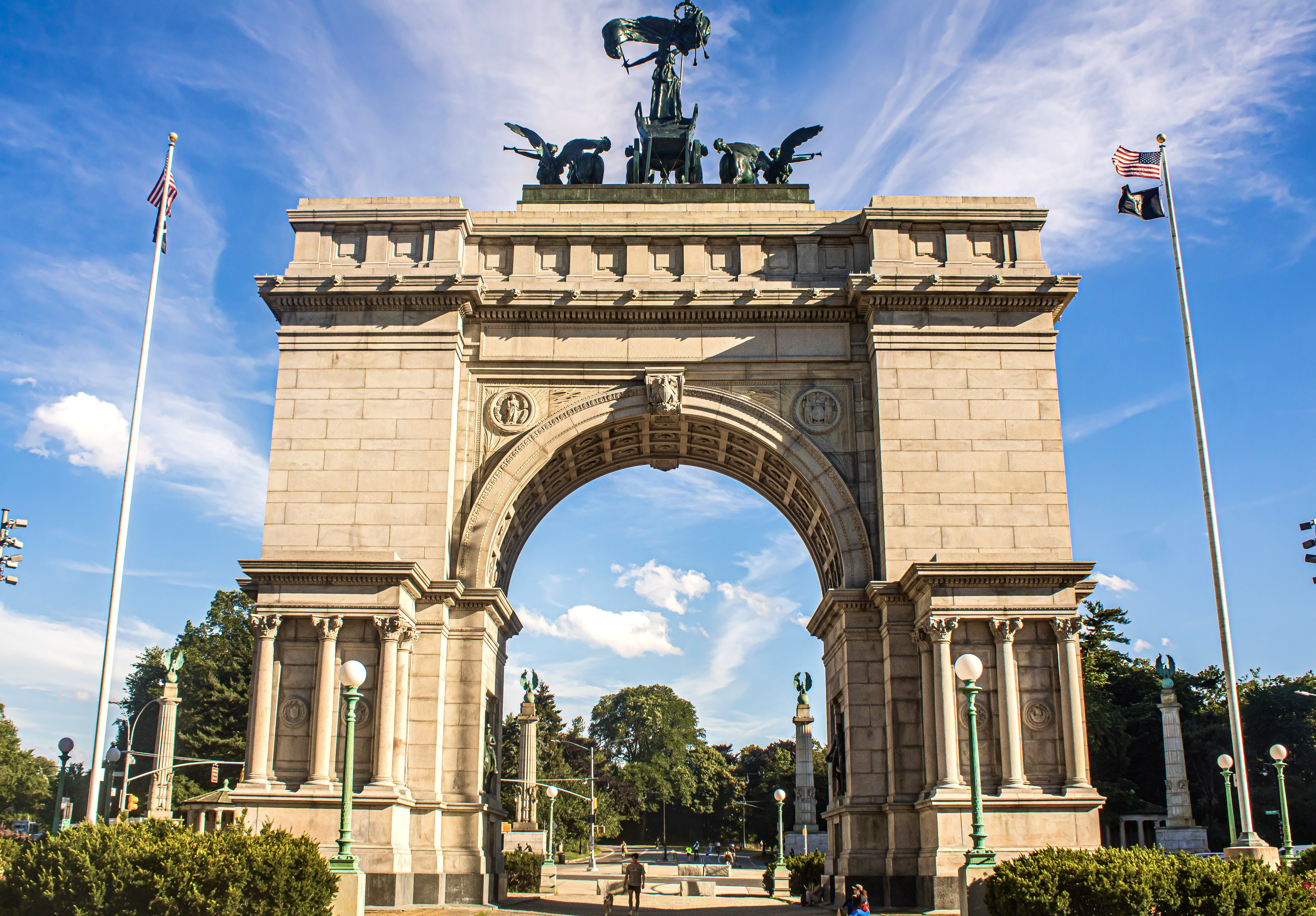
The north face of the arch, with the entrance to Prospect Park in the background

After the American Civil War, the city of Brooklyn planned a grand memorial to Union Army soldiers. Although a statue of Lincoln on Grand Army Plaza and a memorial shaft on Battle Hill were erected in the late 1860s, no major monuments were built in Brooklyn for two decades. In May 1887, the New York State Legislature passed legislation authorizing the development of a major Civil War monument in Brooklyn, Initially, the monument's construction was to be overseen by Brooklyn's mayor and common council. Brooklyn's park commissioners agreed that June to develop the monument in City Hall Park (now Columbus Park). The legislature decided in 1888 to instead appoint a three-person commission to develop the monument. The commission consisted of Brooklyn's mayor, Brooklyn's aldermanic president, and the Grand Army of the Republic Memorial Committee's chairman.

The state legislature allocated $100,000 for the monument, of which half was to be made available during 1888 and half in 1889. The monument was planned as a shaft, and contracts were about to be awarded for the shaft when the plans were changed. By early 1888, a memorial arch was being proposed at Prospect Park Plaza (later Grand Army Plaza) instead. The plans for the arch followed the dedication of the Soldiers and Sailors Memorial Arch in the city of Hartford, Connecticut, in 1886. After Brooklyn mayor Alfred C. Chapin vetoed an initial design by Henry Baerer, an architectural design competition for the monument was hosted for the arch. By October 1888, thirty-six architectural firms had submitted designs. The Soldiers' and Sailors' Monument Commission hired William R. Ware and Charles B. Atwood to review the designs. The state government added another $150,000 for the arch's construction in 1889.

John Hemenway Duncan, the designer of Grant's Tomb in Manhattan, was selected as the architect that August. Duncan received $1,000 for his design, and the runner-up was to receive $500. Duncan's design, known as "Red Seal", called for a structure with statuary at the top and pilasters supporting the attic. There were supposed to have been pedestals at the base of either of the arch's abutments, topped by bronze allegorical groups of statues. The arch was originally supposed to stand across an entrance into the park. However, Duncan objected to placing the arch on the park's perimeter, and Brooklyn city officials agreed instead to build the arch at the plaza's southern end, within a median, in September 1889. The arch was originally supposed to stand 100 feet (30 m) tall, but the Monument Commission recommended reducing the arch's height to reduce the amount of stone needed. Even with a reduced height, the arch was intended to be one of the world's largest triumphal arches.

=== Construction ===
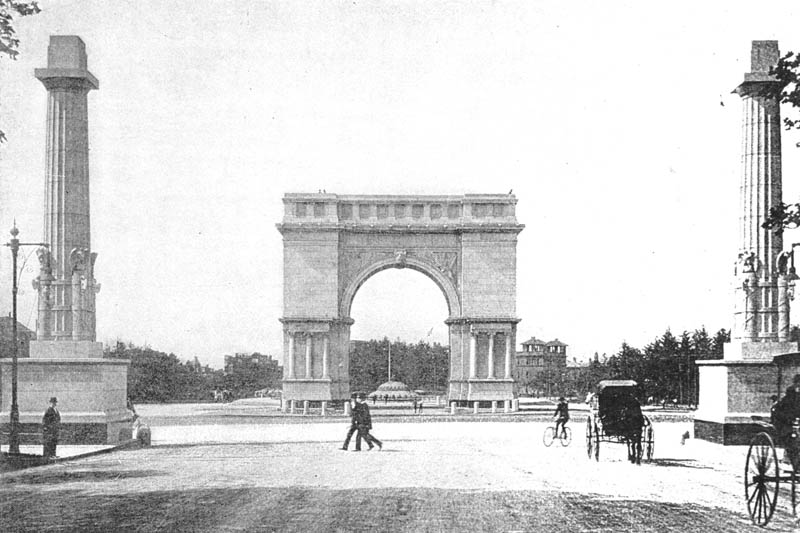
Arch in 1894 without sculptures

Several contractors were invited to submit bids for the arch in late 1889, and Cranford & Valentine were hired to excavate the foundations for $12,274. Brooklyn's park commissioners also discussed relocating streetcar tracks in Prospect Park Plaza, as these tracks intersected near the site of the arch. Duncan also contemplated raising the arch's foundation to make it more prominent, though he did not want to add "filigree ornamentation". The cornerstone of the arch was laid on October 30, 1889, and Civil War general William Tecumseh Sherman spoke at the ceremony. The foundation of the eastern abutment was constructed first because the site of the western abutment was occupied by streetcar tracks. By the end of 1889, plans were being drawn up for the upper portion of the arch. Duncan revised his plans for the arch in February 1890 so the abutments would be more sturdy.

Work was delayed due to the need to relocate the streetcar tracks. In addition, while constructing the foundation, workers discovered a layer of muck beneath the site of the arch, a remnant of a former pond. The Memorial Arch Commission solicited bids for the arch's stonework in March 1890 and received five bids, of which three were reviewed. Bernard Gallagher submitted the lowest of these three bids, at $174,592, and received the contract. Gallagher was originally required to complete the arch within a year, but the Arch Commission extended the deadline to September 1891 shortly afterward. John W. Fowler received a $16,995 contract in May 1890 to relocate the streetcar tracks so the rest of the arch could be constructed. Four existing streetcar tracks in the plaza were rerouted, and the new tracks were completed in July. By that September, a temporary construction fence had been erected around the site of the arch, and the contractors had erected derricks to install the arch's granite pieces. Brooklyn's park commission wanted to allow advertisements on the fence, but this was controversial, and the commission ultimately decided against the advertisements.

Thomas Eakins and William Rudolf O'Donovan were hired c. 1891 to sculpt bas-reliefs of Abraham Lincoln and Ulysses S. Grant. The Union Granite Company also received contracts for bronze and granite bollards around the arch, as well as carvings on the arch's spandrels. Some of the arch's stones became severely discolored shortly after they were installed, prompting allegations that iron was being used in place of granite. State legislators also tried to allocate another $100,000 for the acquisition of statuary, but the effort was unsuccessful. That July, Duncan submitted designs for the arch's spandrels to the Soldiers' and Sailors' Arch Commission. The arch was supposed to have been completed in late 1891, but work was delayed because of a strike at the granite supplier's quarry. The Arch Commission voted in July 1892 to install incandescent light bulbs on the southern facade and to delay the installation of all the arch's sculptures. The monument ultimately cost $250,000 (equivalent to $8,958,000 in 2025).

== Completion and modifications ==
The arch was dedicated on October 21, 1892, with a ceremony led by U.S. President Grover Cleveland. The ceremony coincided with a citywide celebration of the 400th anniversary of Christopher Columbus's expedition to the Americas. When the arch was dedicated, the area around its base was devoid of plantings and ornamentation. There were proposals to plant grass plots and flower beds in the plaza, as well as add statuary to the arch, after the monument was completed. After the arch's dedication, the lights on the arch were not reactivated until January 1894. The New-York Tribune also alleged that the arch's construction had been mismanaged and that several construction contracts had been grossly overpriced, such as the contract for the electric lights. The arch had gutters from the outset, but officials reported leaks in the arch as early as 1896. There were plans to fit out a trophy room at the top of the arch, but these plans had not been carried out by the late 1890s.

=== Installation of bas-reliefs and sculptures ===
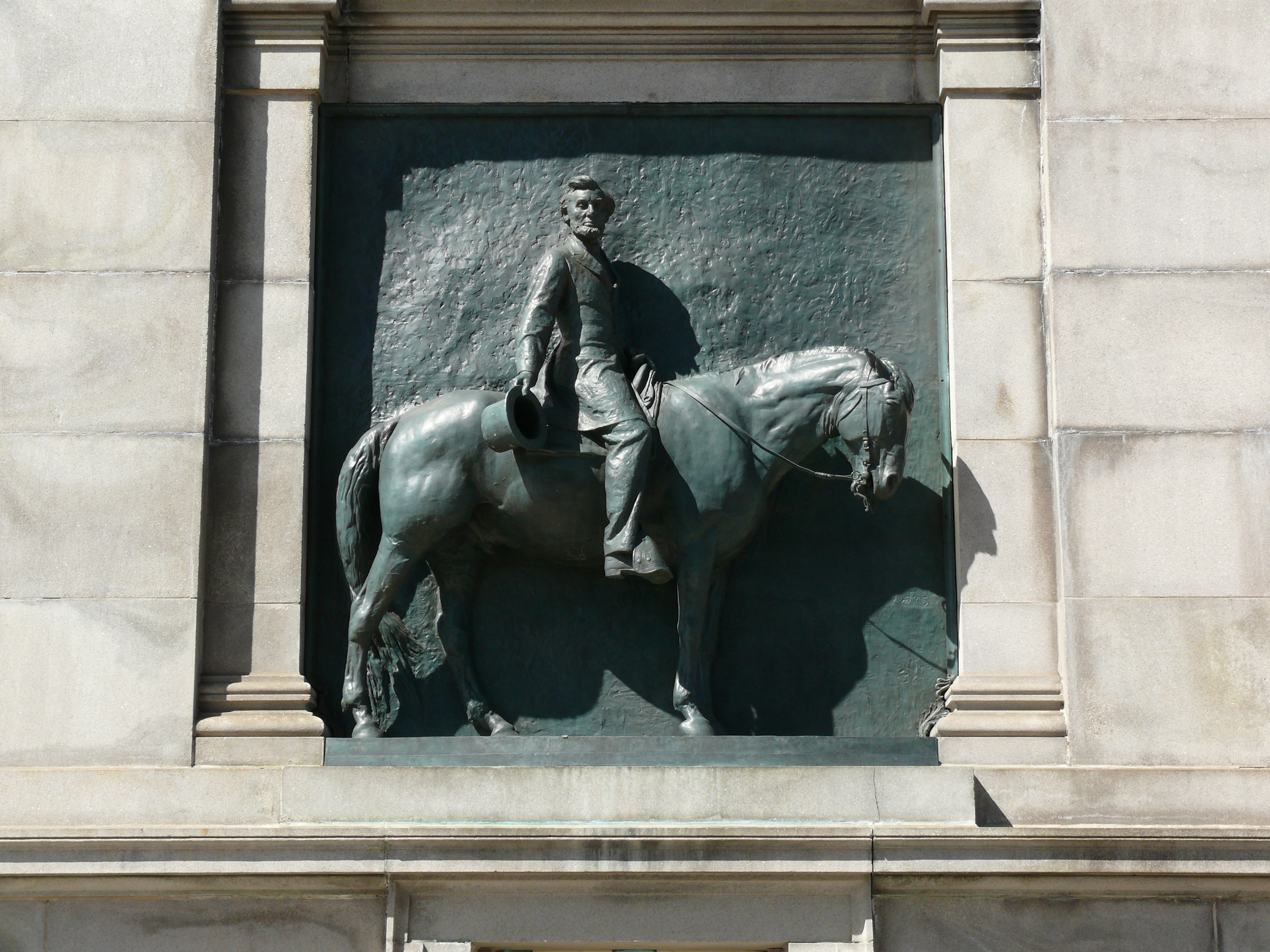
The Lincoln bas-relief was one of two reliefs that Thomas Eakins and William Rudolf O'Donovan designed for the arch.

Brooklyn Park Commissioner Frank Squire engaged Frederick MacMonnies to design a quadriga, or chariot with four horses, above the arch in October 1894. MacMonnies was also hired to design two other sculptural groups next to the arch's base. Eakins's and Donovan's bas-reliefs of Grand and Lincoln were installed during late 1895. The bas-reliefs were controversial, and critics regarded them as being of poor quality. Brooklyn park commissioner Timothy L. Woodruff initially refused to pay $7,500 of the bas-reliefs' $17,500 cost, but he had agreed to provide the funds in July 1896. Additionally, as part of a renovation of Prospect Park Plaza, new lamps were installed, and several laurels and evergreens were planted around the monument to draw attention away from its bare walls. The bollards at the arch's base were moved, and workers installed a heavy bronze chain through the bollards. A pavement was also laid around the base of the arch.

Meanwhile, MacMonnies designed the arch's sculptures at his studio in Paris's Latin Quarter; he was still sketching out the Army and Navy sculptures by mid-1896. By June 1897, the design of the quadriga was finished. MacMonnies used a different cast for each of the figures, such that none of the figures were identical. The Grand Army of the Republic (GAR) preferred that the sculptures be completed by Memorial Day in 1898, as they wanted to invite MacMonnies to see the dedication of his own work. The quadriga was shipped to the United States in August 1898. Although the arch was strong enough to carry the quadriga, a granite foundation for it had to be built on the arch's roof. The quadriga's installation was delayed because workers had to wait for MacMonnies's foreman to come to the U.S., but the sculpture was in place by the end of 1898. The skylights on the arch's roof were covered to make way for the quadriga. MacMonnies had completed the cast of the Army statues by that November, while the models for the Navy statues were finished by 1899.

The Army sculptures were completed by March 1900 and shipped to the U.S. that July. MacMonnies initially refused to install the sculptures himself. He ultimately relented after being notified that he would not be paid unless the sculptures were installed. Additionally, the sculptures' black iron frames had to be replaced with galvanized iron before they were installed, and one of the Army sculptures' heads had to be replaced due to a lack of space. The Army sculptures were in place by November 1900. The Navy sculptures were damaged while being shipped to the U.S. They were repaired at the Barnard studio in Manhattan, then transported across the Brooklyn Bridge for installation. The sculptures were dedicated on April 13, 1901. The Army and Navy sculptures cost $50,000 or $60,000 in total. The eagles atop the arch, also designed by MacMonnies, were installed in late 1901.

=== 20th century ===
As early as the 1900s, the adjacent plaza was unofficially known as Grand Army Plaza because of the presence of the Soldiers' and Sailors' Arch. In the arch's early years, it was visible from much of Brooklyn, as it was located atop one of the highest points in the borough. It was frequently lit for events during the early 20th century. The arch was the setting for annual events, such as the parades of the Boys Brigade and Brooklyn's annual Memorial Day parades. Ceremonies at the arch also commemorated major events, such as when the Spanish–American War, World War I, and World War II ended. Other events included a ceremony in 1926 when Prospect Park Plaza was formally renamed Grand Army Plaza, as well as another ceremony in 1955 when the Brooklyn Dodgers won the World Series. In addition, starting in 1920, a Christmas tree was erected near the arch every year.

The room in the monument's attic remained empty for several years after its completion, and the war museum within the arch's attic was never opened to the public. According to Augie Inzerra, who was the arch's caretaker in the 1940s, the idea of using the arch as a museum was scrapped after someone was injured while ascending the stairs. Instead, the American Legion veterans' organization used the attic as meeting and storage space until the late 20th century. The New York City Department of Parks and Recreation (NYC Parks) used the ground story of one abutment as a tool shed, while the other abutment's ground story contained pumps for the adjacent Bailey Fountain.

==== Early and mid-20th century ====
Brooklyn park commissioner James J. Browne requested $6,000 in 1929 to repair the arch, saying one of the quadriga's horses had come loose. NYC Parks solicited bids for the arch's renovation in June 1930, and workers began repairing the arch's stonework later that year. With the construction of the Bailey Fountain, in 1931, workers installed a pump for the fountain underneath the monument. NYC Parks announced in 1935 that it would clean the arch again when funds were allocated. The project would include cleaning the granite and the Army and Navy sculptural groups, as well as repairs to the brick pavement, bas-reliefs, and electroliers. City officials said in 1937 that there would be no funding for the arch's restoration for at least a year, but, by 1938, no renovations were being planned for the arch itself. The arch was not illuminated during World War II due to wartime blackout regulations. In 1941, Brooklyn borough president John Cashmore suggested illuminating the monument at night, although the Board of Estimate voted to defer the installation of the lights until after the end of the war, citing a lack of funds. The lights were installed in November 1945 after the Board of Estimate allocated $3,500 to pay for new floodlights.

A piece of copper flashing near the arch's roof was knocked loose following a storm in 1952, prompting NYC Parks officials to plan emergency repairs. The flashing was removed pending permanent repairs. NYC Parks engineers found that the original quadriga had a design flaw; the bronze sculptures were mounted directly to a steel support frame, which had begun to flake over time due to water damage. Engineers initially estimated that the repairs would cost $30,000, though this was later reduced to $16,000. NYC Parks requested funds for the renovation in early 1954, and the quadriga's steel frame was renovated during the mid-1950s; however, little documentation exists for this renovation. Due to funding shortages, the floodlights were turned off before the 1960s.

Following the assassination of John F. Kennedy, there were proposals to suspend an eternal flame from the arch in 1963; the flame was ultimately placed next to the arch instead. Additionally, in the early 1960s, Brooklyn borough president Abe Stark and NYC Parks commissioner Newbold Morris proposed adding stronger floodlights to the arch. This was part of Stark and Morris's proposal for a wider-ranging renovation of Grand Army Plaza. The city's Department of Water Supply, Gas, and Electricity approved the floodlighting proposal in early 1965. Mayor John Lindsay and NYC Parks commissioner August Heckscher provided $150,000 for a renovation of the arch in 1967.

==== Late-20th-century renovations ====
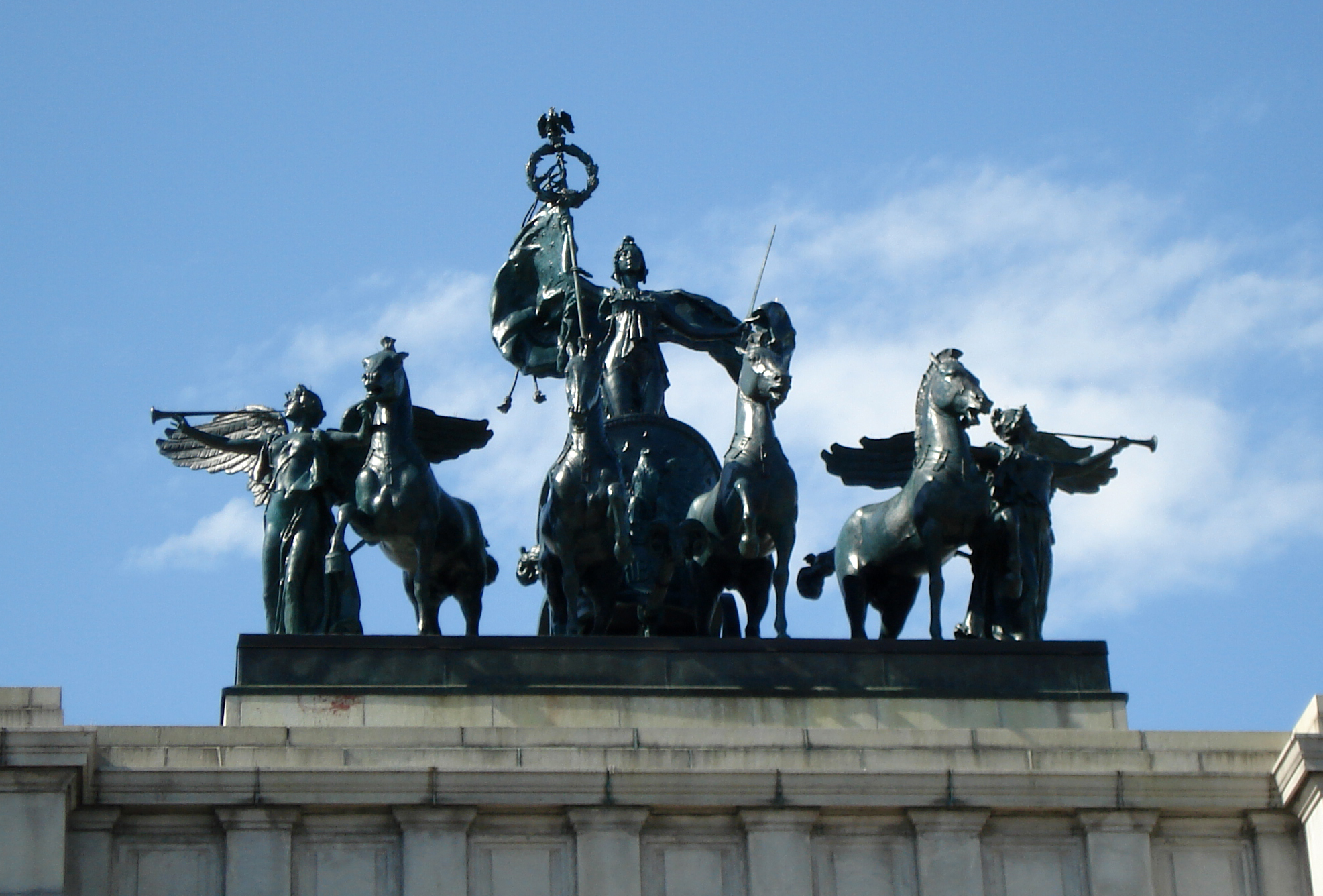
The quadriga's central figure came loose during a 1976 windstorm.

By the 1970s, vandals frequently spray-painted graffiti on the arch and its sculptures. NYC Parks allocated around $147,000 in 1971 to clean the arch and install new pavement around it. In addition, NYC Parks planned to add new doors, gates, chains; replace the arch's bronze decorations; and reinstall damaged lampposts. The New York City Landmarks Preservation Commission (LPC) hosted hearings in September 1973 to determine whether the arch should be designated as a city landmark, and the LPC granted the landmark designation in October 1973. The Board of Estimate approved the designation that December.

The central figure of the arch's quadriga came loose during a windstorm in October 1976; according to Prospect Park's administrator Mariella Bisson, the figure was dangling by one screw. City parks commissioner Martin Lang estimated that the arch needed $200,000 worth of repairs, and members of the public requested that the figure be restored. Work was delayed four years due to the New York City fiscal crisis. City officials presented plans for a complete restoration of the arch to the LPC in March 1979, and a $432,000 restoration contract was awarded to Thomason Industries Corporation that November. The restoration included cleaning the statues, adding waterproofing and wire mesh, applying a preservative to protect against pigeon droppings, and restoring the interior stair. The arch's restoration was part of a wider-ranging renovation of Prospect Park. The quadriga's central figure was reinstalled in October 1980, and the restoration was completed the same month, several weeks ahead of schedule. The arch was seldom vandalized after its renovation was completed.

The roof deck reopened in 1981, and the arch's interior was also opened to the public for the first time that year. The public was initially allowed to access the arch's interior and deck on selected Sunday afternoons, and 25,000 people had visited within two years of its reopening. The arch lacked a climate-control system, so the deck operated only during autumn and spring. The arch and its deck also began hosting artwork by local artists. The state government provided a $160,000 grant in 1989 to fund the restoration of drainage and structural support systems. Until the early 1990s, the arch hosted two art exhibitions a year; the western abutment was used as storage space, while the eastern abutment and attic were used for exhibits. Comparatively few people knew about the rooftop deck as well.

The arch was closed in late 1991 for a roof repair that was supposed to take two years. By then, the attic frequently suffered water damage due to the leaky roof, restricting certain types of art from being displayed in the arch; in addition, the attic had to be repainted annually due to water infiltration. The roof restoration was expected to cost $375,000. The next year, NYC Parks began preparing $380,000 worth of repairs to the statuary. The arch reopened in May 1994, and artists again began hosting exhibits in the arch's attic. The Prospect Park Alliance and Urban Park Rangers also hosted tours of the arch and its roof. Another restoration of the arch began in July 1999 after Brooklyn borough president Howard Golden and the David Schwartz Foundation provided a combined $240,000 for the project. Workers cleaned MacMonnies's sculptures, although not the bas-reliefs inside the archway opening; the restoration was completed by the end of the year. The New York City Department of Transportation also painted a walkway onto the road, leading from the arch to the park's entrance.

=== 21st century ===
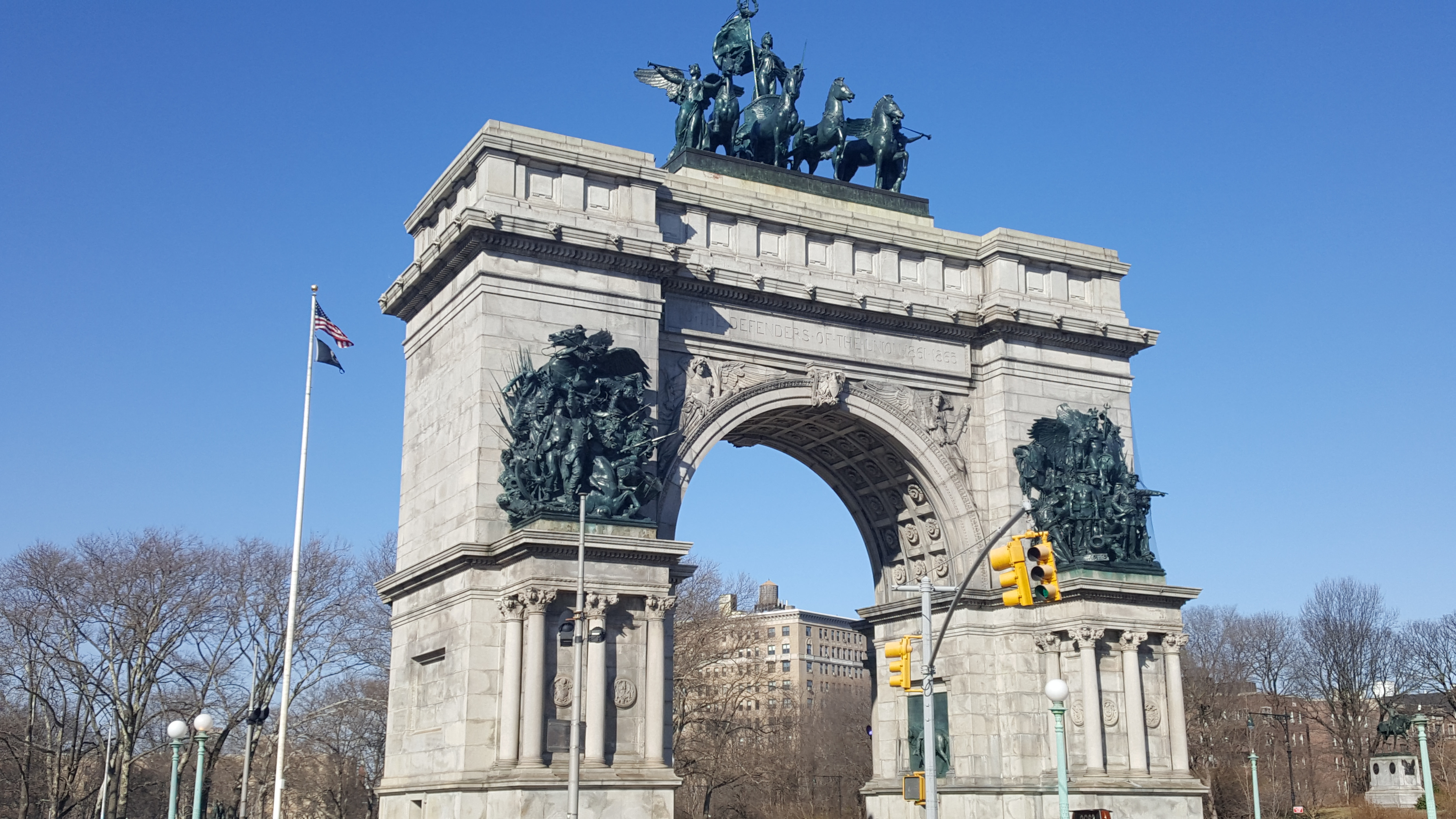
The arch as seen from the southwest in 2020

The rooftop observation deck was closed in the 2000s because the deck had severely degraded. The New York Puppet Library agreed to lease the room in the arch's attic from the Prospect Park Alliance in 2003, on the condition that the puppet group host three annual puppet shows in Prospect Park. Music and theatrical performances also took place underneath and within the arch. The sculptures were cleaned yet again in 2009; the project cost $1.1 million and was funded by borough president Marty Markowitz and City Council member Letitia James. By then, the roof was leaking and was seldom open to the public. The Puppet Library relocated to the Brooklyn College campus in 2010 due to the leaky roof. During the 2010s, the interior was closed except for special events. By then, the roof deck had partially collapsed, and invasive species were growing from the deck. In addition, one of the staircases inside had detached from the wall.

The New York City government gave the Prospect Park Alliance $8.9 million in August 2018 for a full restoration of the plaza, including restoration of the arch. At the time, the city planned to reopen the arch's observation deck once the renovation was complete. After debris fell from the arch in late 2018, the underside of the arch was fenced off. Designs for the project were announced in November 2020. Western Waterproofing Co. was awarded a contract to restore the arch in March 2023, and work began that May. Before restoring the arch, workers had to scan the arch's interior, since the original blueprints had disappeared. The project included the addition of brick reinforcement and the restoration of the facade, drains, stairways, lights, and roof; the arch was closed during this work. Some of the damaged stone was replaced with stone from a quarry in Maine, near another quarry that had provided the arch's original stone. The exterior was also pressure-washed with an aggregate material. The arch's restoration was completed in June 2025, having cost $8.9 million.

== Impact ==
=== Reception ===
==== Contemporary ====
In 1889, a writer for the magazine Harper's Weekly likened Duncan's design to the Arc de Triomphe in Paris and to triumphal arches in Rome, although the arch was to be shallower and have a lower attic compared to the older arches. Stone magazine wrote that the arch was unique among American memorials, which tended to be statues, columns, or shafts, and that the structure was impressive because of its size and large proportions. Scientific American regarded the arch as "one of the most conspicuous and beautiful" war monuments. The Manufacturer and Builder magazine described the arch as "noble in conception, imposing in magnitude, harmonious in proportion, and appropriate and effective in ornamentation".

After the arch was dedicated, the Brooklyn Citizen wrote that the arch was "a noble specimen of monumental architecture, and does infinite credit to its talented designer, Mr. John H. Duncan". A reporter for Scientific American wrote that they hoped the arch's completion would cause "the tasteless granite column" to fall out of fashion. Conversely, the New-York Tribune described the arch as poorly placed, and the Municipal Art Commission thought the arch faced the wrong way. The Brooklyn Times-Union described the Soldiers' and Sailors' Arch as superior to Manhattan's Washington Square Arch and, in 1913, described the arch as the "Arc de Triomphe of America".

After Eakins's and Donovan's bas-reliefs were installed, the Tribune quoted critics who described the relief as "obtrusive" and "humiliating". In a guidebook about Prospect Park and Brooklyn Botanic Garden, Richard Berenson and Neil deMause wrote that Lincoln looked like he was "begging for pennies" with his hat. The American Institute of Architects' Brooklyn chapter declared the reliefs to be "disreputable examples of the arts of sculpture and design". When the quadriga was installed in 1898, The New York Times wrote that the sculptures attracted "much attention by reason of its artistic beauty", while the Brooklyn Daily Eagle said the quadriga had a "proud, heroic, strong" effect. The Brooklyn Daily Eagle critic wrote that the quadriga added an artistic touch to the arch, whereas the bas-reliefs were present purely for political purposes. Brooklyn Life said the MacMonnies statues "are fine pieces of sculpture that will bear study at quite close range".

==== Retrospective ====
The architectural critic Henry Hope Reed Jr. wrote in 1963 that the Soldiers' and Sailors' Arch was the "outstanding triumphal arch in the country" in part because of its sculptural decoration. A New York Times writer said in 1973 that the Grant and Lincoln reliefs evoked European equestrian statues but that they still had "downhome simplicity about them". Paul Goldberger, writing for the same newspaper in 1984, said that the Soldiers' and Sailors' Arch was the greatest classical grouping in New York City" despite the disconnected architecture of the surrounding neighborhood. A writer for The Philadelphia Inquirer said the arch's placement was as "majestic as the Arc de Triomphe", and NYC Parks commissioner Adrian Benepe regarded the arch as likely "the city's most impressive work of art".

Jesse Goldstein of The Village Voice said in 2002 that, because of the arch's presence, Brooklyn's Grand Army Plaza was superior to the similarly named plaza in Manhattan. Similarly, a writer for The American Enterprise regarded the arch as the best example of a triumphal arch in the United States. In 2011, a writer for American Civil War magazine wrote that the arch's design was "perhaps second only to the Arc de Triomphe", even though the Brooklyn arch was hard for pedestrians to access.

=== Design influence ===
The arch's design inspired that of the gateway to the LIU Brooklyn campus in Downtown Brooklyn. In addition, mosaics and plaques with angel motifs were installed in the New York City Subway's nearby Grand Army Plaza station in 1996. The motifs, part of an artwork known as Wings for the IRT: The Irresistible Romance of Travel, were inspired by the decorations on the Soldiers' and Sailors' Arch. Depictions of the arch are also engraved onto bronze medallions at the Park Union, a nearby apartment building.

== See also ==
- List of post-Roman triumphal arches
- List of New York City Designated Landmarks in Brooklyn
