= Bailey Fountain =

Fountain and sculpture in Brooklyn, New York, U.S.

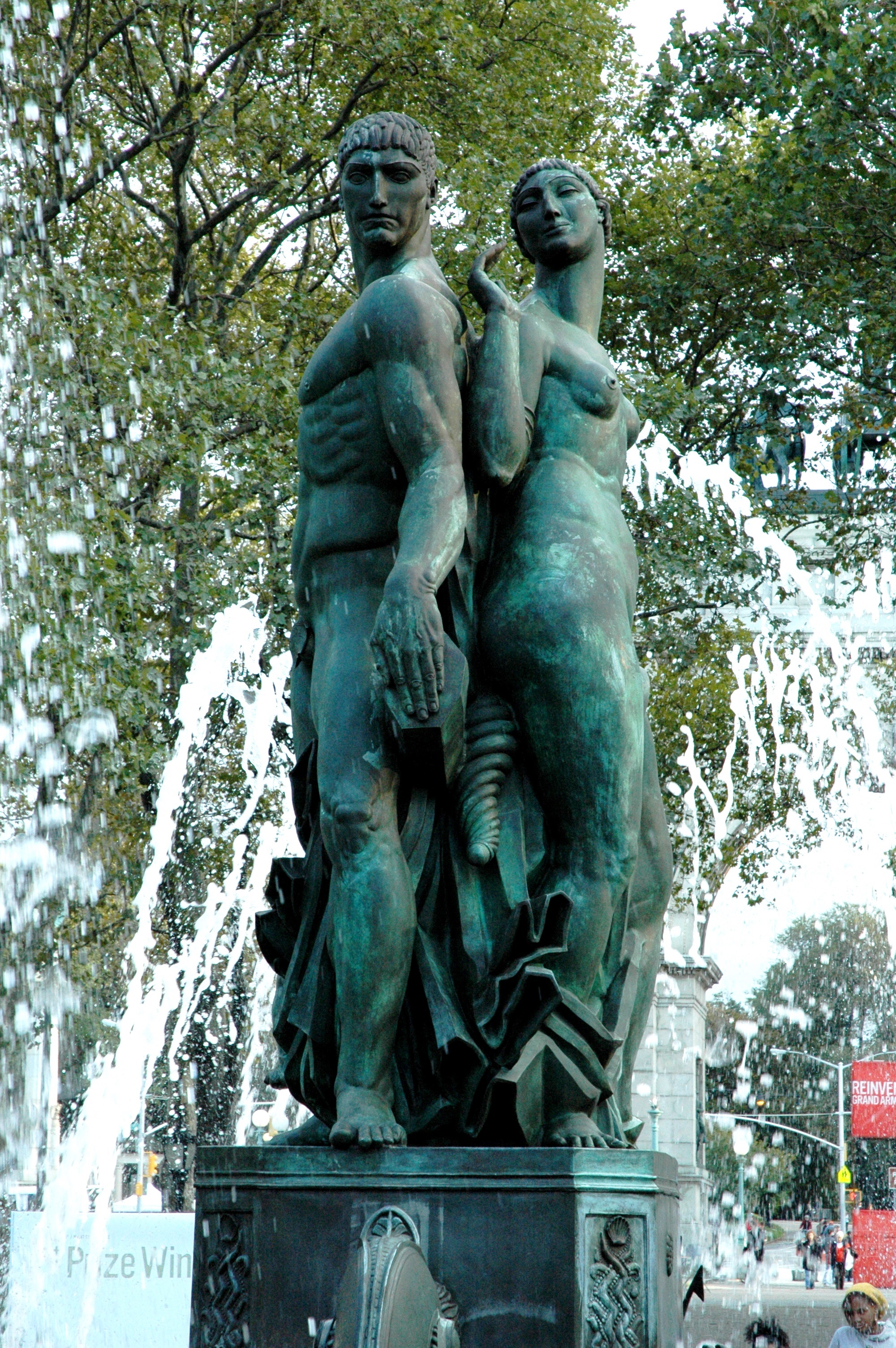
- Artist: Egerton Swartwout (architect); Eugene Savage (sculptor)
- Completion date: 1929-1932
- Medium: Fountain
- Location: Prospect Park, Brooklyn, New York City; 40.67389°N 73.97009°W

Bailey Fountain is an outdoor sculpture in New York City at the site of three 19th-century fountains in Grand Army Plaza, Brooklyn, New York, United States. Renovated in 1956 and 2005-06, the 1932 fountain was funded by philanthropist Frank Bailey as a memorial to his wife Marie Louise Bailey. After 1974 thefts, some sculpture elements were stored for safekeeping. The bronze Art Deco design of the Bailey Fountain consists of six monumental figures beginning with the top two, a man representing Wisdom with his left hand on the tiller steering the ship of Life and a woman representing Felicity with her left hand holding a cornucopia. Below them are two other statues, one a chubby standing child helping to shoulder that cornucopia, while the second is a laughing Greek mythological figure called Nereus who is the eldest son of Pontus the Sea and Gaia the Earth. To the sides of the fountain are the two remaining figures, Nereids, female sea nymphs (and daughters of Nereus), with their upper torsos emerging from the water. Their heads are thrown back as they trumpet with conch shells, and their fish tails twist in the background.

== Fountain of the Golden Spray ==
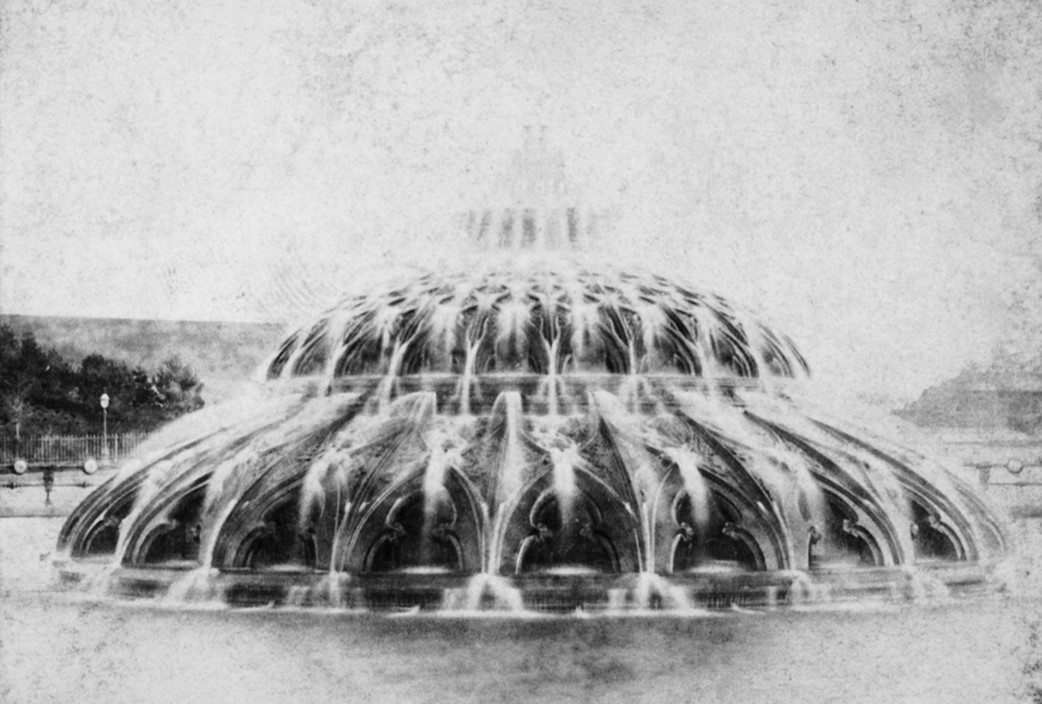
1873 dome fountain

The Fountain of the Golden Spray of 1867 with a single jet of water was part of the 1867 Grand Army Plaza design.

== Dome fountain ==
The 1873 dome fountain by Calvert Vaux replaced the 1867 fountain with a two-tiered, double-domed structure of cast iron and molded sections of Beton Coignet. Gaslights in the 37.2 foot (11.4 m) diameter dome were visible through one of 24 colored glass windows for evening illumination. Additional gaslights mounted in the guardrail illuminated the surface of the pool. The Brooklyn Mayor criticized the water use of the fountain which could pump 60,000 gallons an hour, and by the 1890s the fountain leaked and was frequently dry. A boy drowned in the fountain in June 1895.

== Electric Fountain ==
Nereus lounging in the 1932 Bailey Fountain's pool

The 1897 Electric Fountain replaced the 1873 fountain and was controlled by 2 operators during scheduled night exhibitions on Wednesdays and Saturdays with audiences up to 30,000. A Brooklyn Park Commissioner's initial plan for a single spout was superseded by Fredric W. Darlington's design, which was presented in May 1897 to the Park Commission. Wilson & Baillie Manufacturing built the fountain, and the commission's "consulting engineer" was C. C. Martin. Landscape architect Frederick Law Olmsted placed the fountain at the intersection of two broad paths arranged as a Georgian cross within grassy, treeless plots at the quadrants. The "first exhibition" contracted for July 4, 1897, was delayed until August 7 and attended by "fully 100,000 people".

The 6,000 candela "automatic focusing arc lamps" were wired in 3 series circuits for dimming, could each be moved 2 ft (0.61 m) within "silver parabolic reflectors" to narrow or widen the 19 beams, and were positioned in concentric rings around a central light. The lights extended into glass cylinders protruding through the underwater ceiling and were each beamed through switchable disks of colored gels into water jets (there was also a lighted central geyser). The ~2,000 nozzles included umbrellas, ball sprays, wheat sheaves, rings, fans, funnels and whirligigs; with many of the nozzles around the lamp housings. An underground control room on the south of the basin allowed the lighting and hydraulics operators to view through three closely spaced windows in the basin wall 6 in (0.15 m) above the pool surface. A pump directed up to 100,000 gallons per hour into the pool in the 120-foot-diameter (37 m) basin, from public water mains, but did not recirculate or reuse the water. (In 1899 and 1901, the fountain was shut off to conserve water.) The fountain also had 88 incandescent lamps on the inner edge of the basin's concrete coping, and the Brooklyn Heights and the Nassau Electric railroads donated the electricity.

The 1915 construction of the New York City Subway's IRT Eastern Parkway Line (2, 3, 4, and 5 trains) and BMT Brighton Line (B and Q trains) under the plaza left no room for the required infrastructure for the Electric Fountain, which was removed.
