= Grand Army Plaza =

Public square in Brooklyn, New York

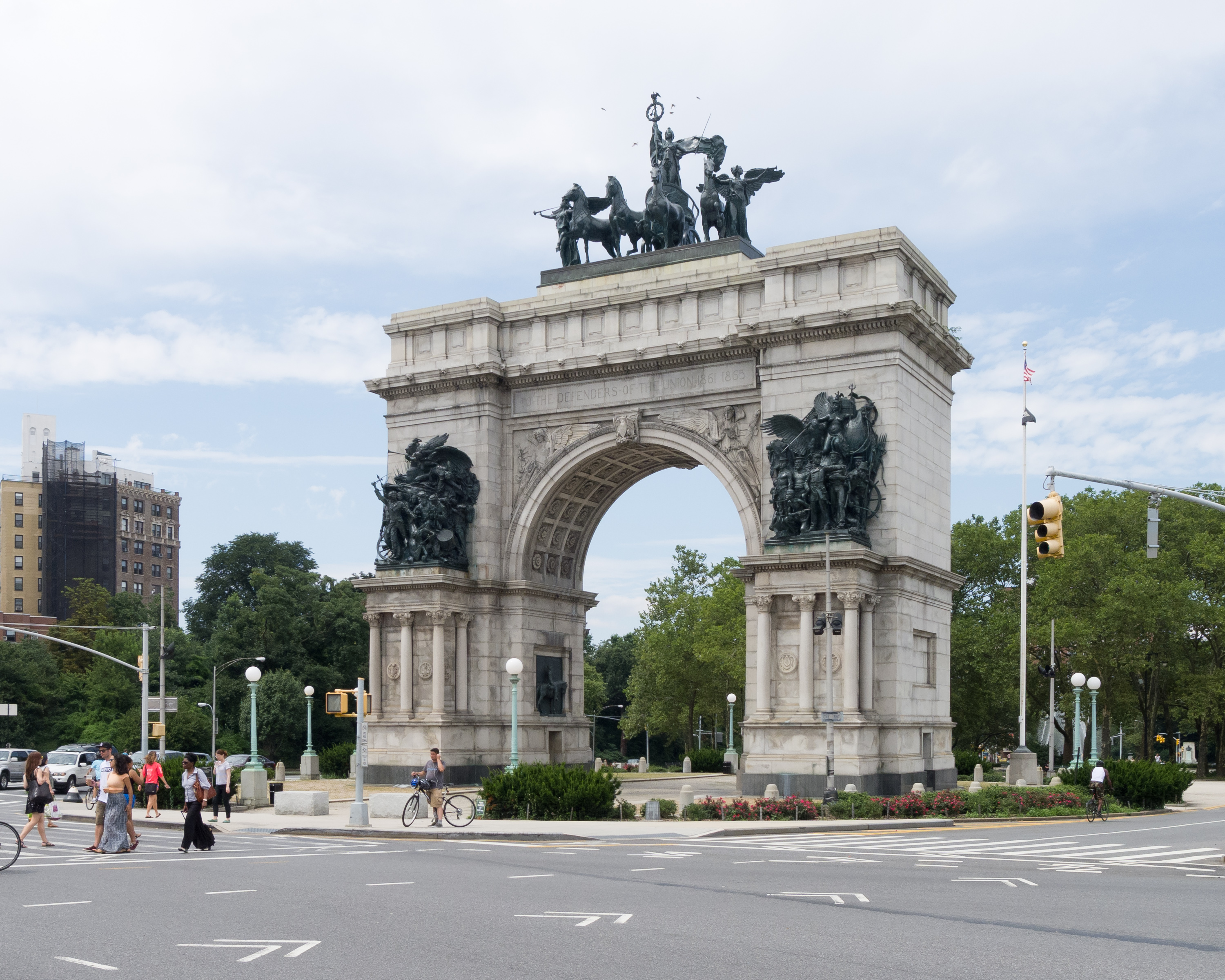
- Grand Army Plaza viewed from the southeast, anchored by the Soldiers' and Sailors' Arch

- Location within New York City Location within New York Location within the United States
- Location: Brooklyn, New York City, New York, United States
- Coordinates: 40°40′26″N 73°58′12″W
- Area: 14.26 acres (5.77 ha)
- Elevation: 131 ft (40 m)

Grand Army Plaza, originally known as Prospect Park Plaza, is a public plaza that comprises the northern corner and the main entrance of Prospect Park in the New York City borough of Brooklyn. It consists of concentric oval rings arranged as streets, with the namesake Plaza Street comprising the outer ring. The inner ring is arranged as an ovoid roadway that carries the main street, Flatbush Avenue. Eight radial roads connect Vanderbilt Avenue; Butler Place; two separate sections of Saint John's Place; Lincoln Place; Eastern Parkway; Prospect Park West; Union Street; and Berkeley Place. The only streets that penetrate to the inner ring are Flatbush Avenue, Vanderbilt Avenue, Prospect Park West, Eastern Parkway, and Union Street.

The plaza includes the Soldiers' and Sailors' Arch; the Bailey Fountain; the John F. Kennedy Monument; statues of Civil War generals Gouverneur K. Warren and Henry Warner Slocum; busts of notable Brooklyn citizens Alexander Skene and Henry W. Maxwell; and two 12-sided gazebos with "granite Tuscan columns, Guastavino vaulting, and bronze finials".

== History ==
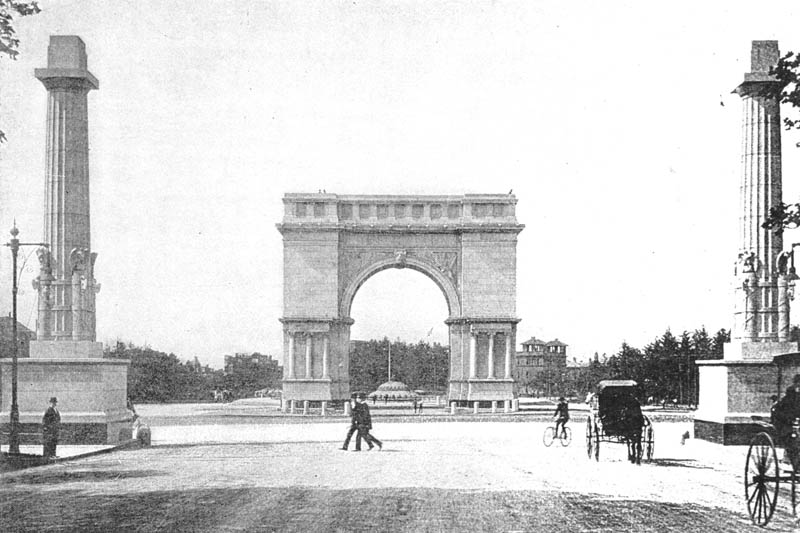
Arch and columns in 1894 without sculptures; the low dome beyond the archway at ground level is the 1873 fountain.

The site of the future Grand Army Plaza was in the 17th century a pass through the Heights of Guan. It played a small role in the 1776 Battle of Long Island, the biggest battle of the American Revolutionary War.

The 1861 plan for Prospect Park included an elliptical plaza at the intersection of Flatbush and Ninth avenues. In 1867, the plaza was designed by Frederick Law Olmsted and Calvert Vaux as a grand entrance to the Park to separate the noisy city from the calm nature of the Park. Olmsted and Vaux's design included only the Fountain of the Golden Spray and the surrounding earth embankments covered in heavy plantings. The berms still shield the local apartment buildings and the Brooklyn Central Library from the noisy traffic circle that has developed. By 1869 the Abraham Lincoln statue by Henry Kirke Brown was north of the plaza fountain's stairs, and the statue was moved to the lower terrace of the park's Concert Grove in 1895.

The original 1867 fountain was successively replaced by an 1873 lighted fountain, an 1897-1915 fountain for exhibitions, and the 1932 Bailey Fountain, renovated in 2006.

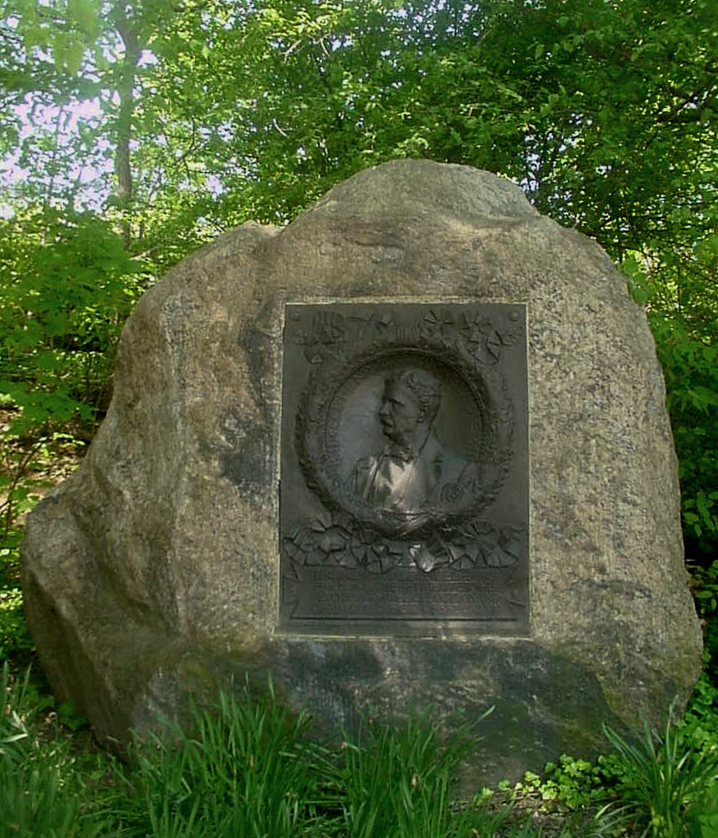
Henry W. Maxwell Memorial (1903)

In 1895, three bronze sculpture groups were added to the 1892 Soldiers' and Sailors' Arch.

In 1926, the plaza, previously known as Prospect Park Plaza, was renamed Grand Army Plaza to commemorate the sixtieth anniversary of the foundation of the Grand Army of the Republic, a fraternal organization composed of veterans of the Union Army and other military services who served in the American Civil War.

In 1975, Grand Army Plaza became a National Historic Landmark. A private funding campaign in 1999 was established to restore the monument. In 2018, keystones from the roof fell and protective barriers were placed around the monument to safeguard pedestrians. A full restoration of the arch and statue was done in 2021, sponsored by the City and Prospect Park Alliance.

In 2008, a competition was held for designs to reorganize Grand Army Plaza to make it a more integral part of Prospect Park and more accessible to pedestrians. At the same time, the New York City Department of Transportation (NYCDOT) made improvements in accessibility, putting sidewalks and planters in many of the striped areas. These improvements made it somewhat easier and safer for pedestrians and cyclists to cross from the park to the library and to the plaza. The changes made by the NYCDOT were modest in comparison to those in the designs in the competition, most of which called for the rerouting of some of the vast traffic flow.

In November 2022, the NYCDOT started soliciting public feedback for a proposal to close Grand Army Plaza permanently to vehicular traffic, converting the plaza to a pedestrian zone. The proposed pedestrian zone would connect with Underhill and Vanderbilt Avenues; these roads are part of the city's Open Streets program, where vehicular traffic is restricted during certain times of day. In April 2026, the NYCDOT announced it would move forward with the more ambitious of two proposed plans, entirely removing car access between the arch and the entrance to Prospect Park. The plan would simplify the intersections where Flatbush Avenue, Eastern Parkway, and Union Street feed into the plaza; add public space; and decrease conflict points between pedestrians and motorists.

== Use ==
Map of notable buildings and structures at Prospect Park (note: not all entrances shown). Click on points for more details.

The area around the Arch forms the largest and busiest traffic circle in Brooklyn, being the convergence of Flatbush Avenue, Vanderbilt Avenue, Eastern Parkway, Prospect Park West, and Union Street. In 1927, Brooklyn's "Death-O-Meter", a sign admonishing drivers to "Slow Up" and displaying a continually updated tally of traffic accident deaths in the borough, was installed.

A popular farmer's market, part of the Greenmarket program of GrowNYC is held on the plaza in front of Prospect Park every Saturday from 8 a.m. to 3 p.m.

The station is served by two New York City Subway stations and multiple bus routes. The Grand Army Plaza station (2 and 3 trains), built in 1920 on the IRT Eastern Parkway Line, is on the north end of the Plaza, while the Seventh Avenue station (B and Q trains) on the BMT Brighton Line is several blocks northwest. The B67 and B69 buses stop at Union Street and 7th Avenue, two blocks north, while the B41 bus stops on Flatbush Avenue.

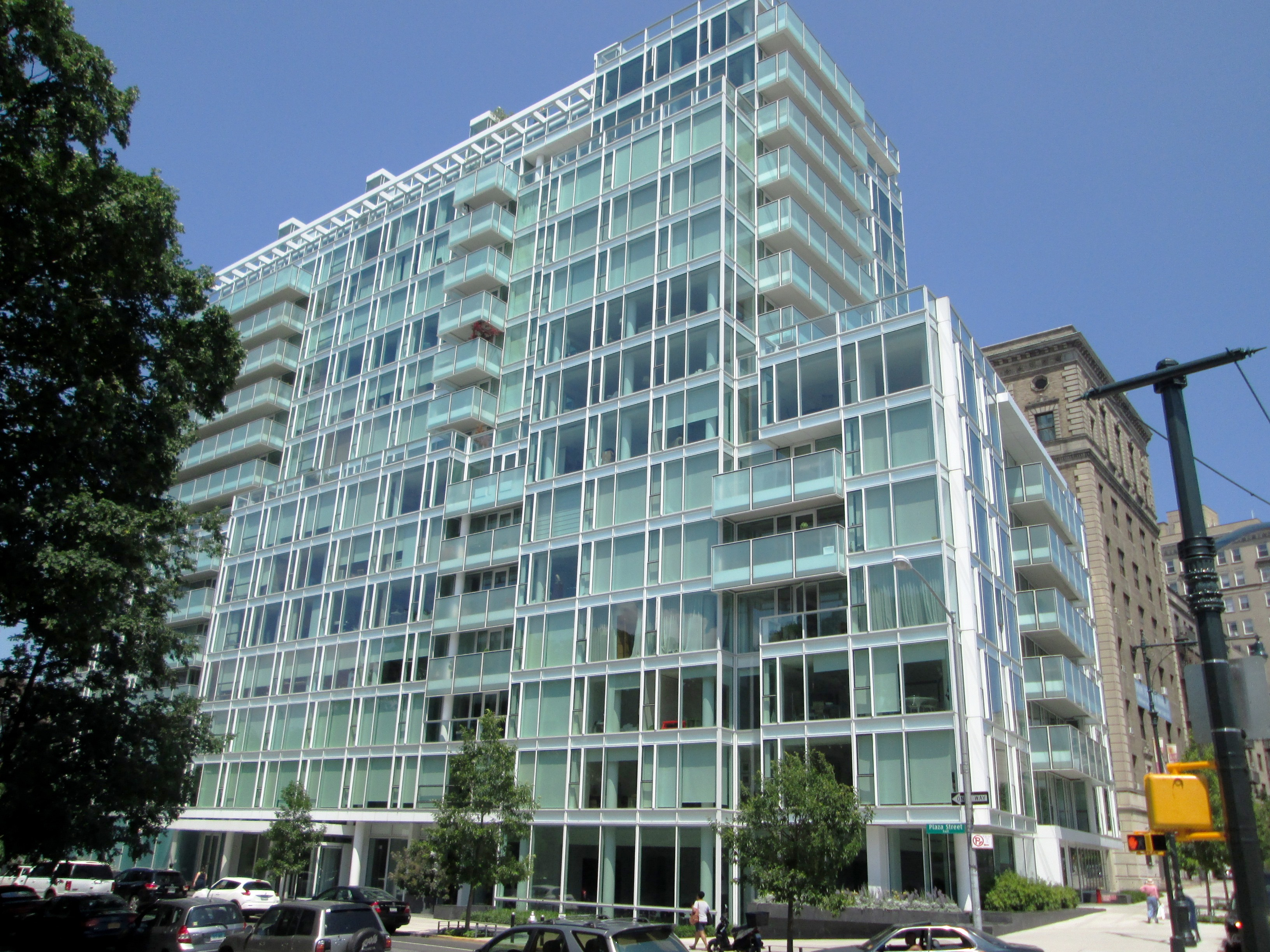
Richard Meier's 1 Grand Army Plaza apartment building was completed in 2009; the AIA Guide calls it "a massive beached whale".

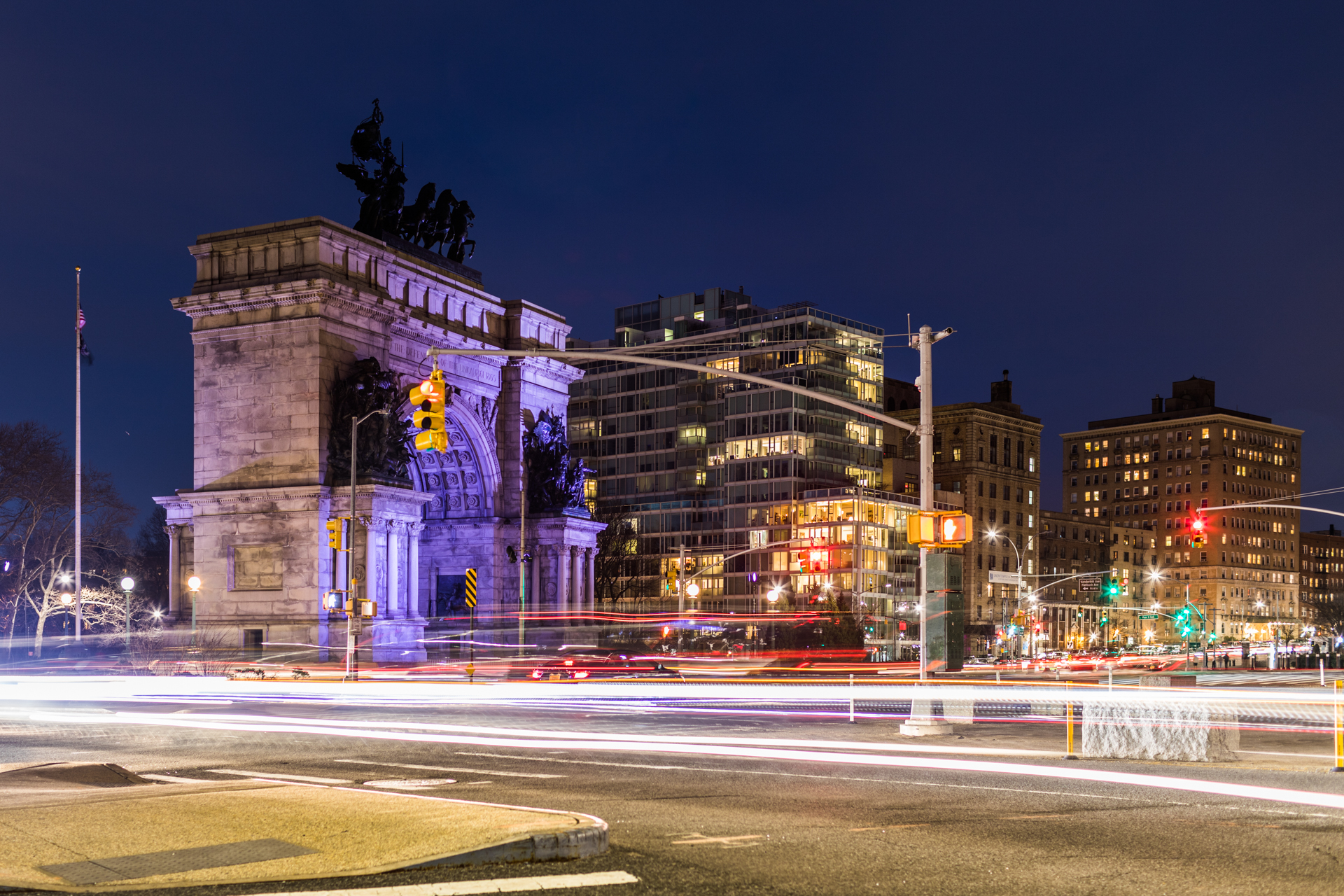
Grand Army Plaza at night

== See also ==
- Statue of Gouverneur K. Warren
