= Bust of Alexander Skene =

Sculpture in Brooklyn, New York, U.S.

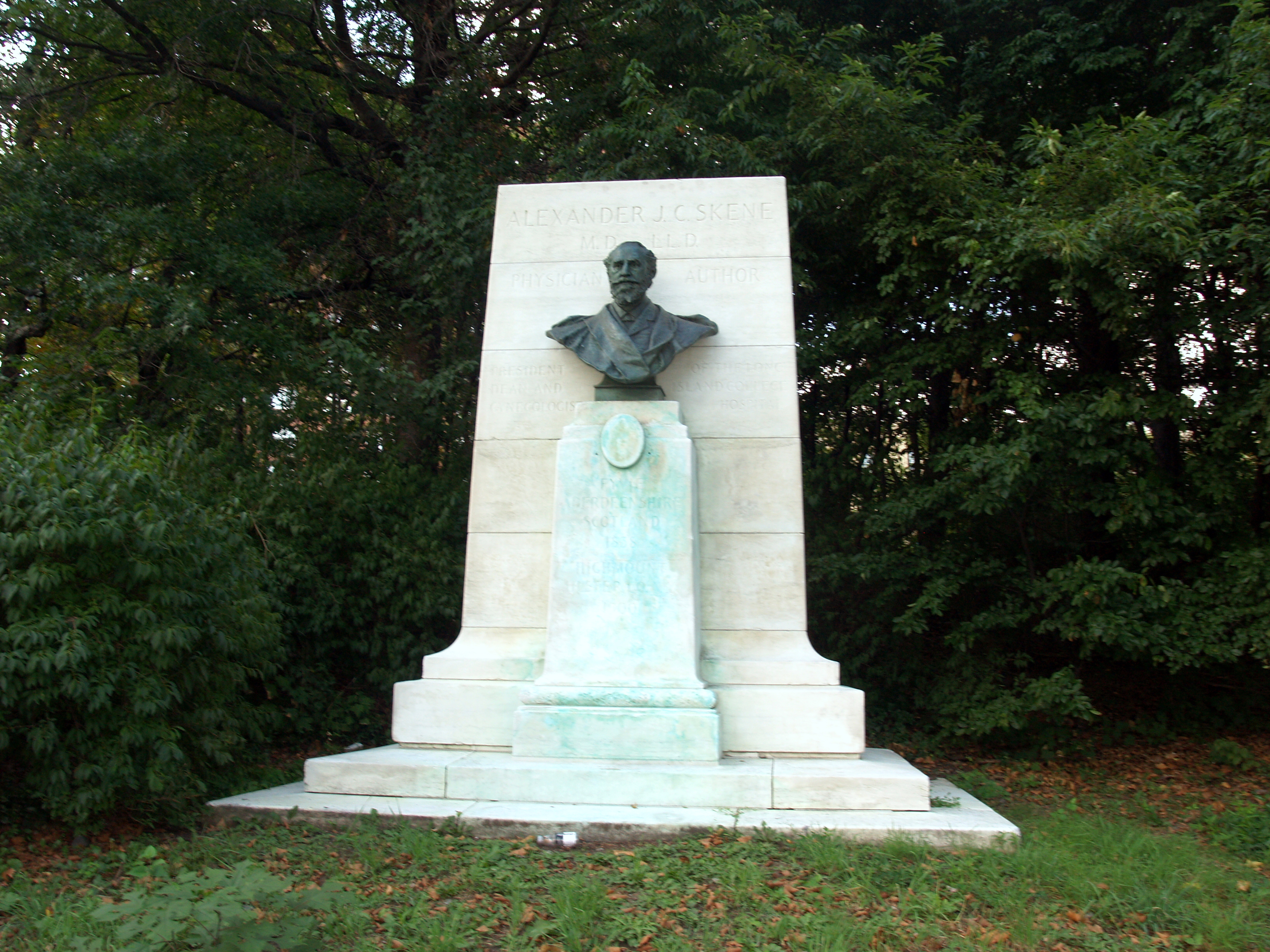
- The memorial in 2008
- Location: New York City, New York, U.S.; 40°40′29.74″N 73°58′13.11″W

A bronze bust of Alexander Skene is installed in Brooklyn's Grand Army Plaza, in the U.S. state of New York.
