= James S. T. Stranahan =

American politician (1808–1898)

Coordinates: 40°40′21″N 73°58′10″W

James S.T. Stranahan
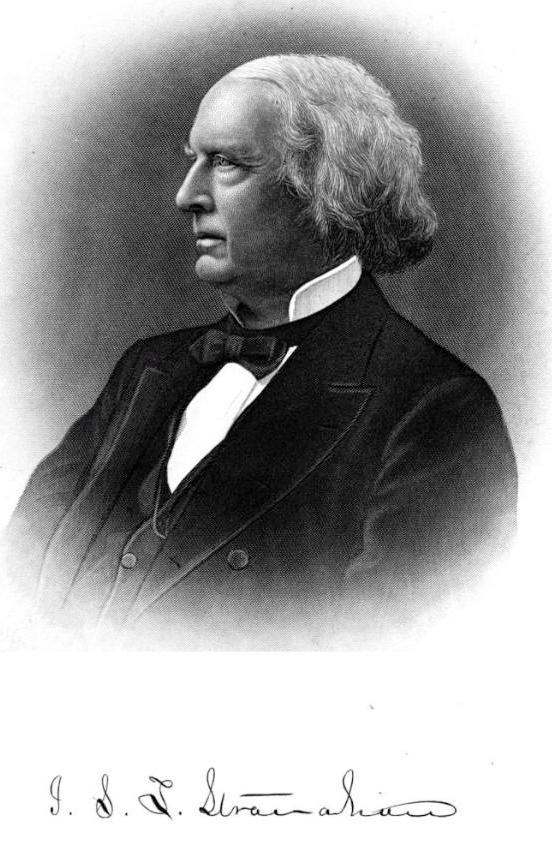

Member of the U.S. House of Representatives from New York's 2nd district
- In office March 4, 1855 – March 3, 1857
- Preceded by: Thomas W. Cumming
- Succeeded by: George Taylor

Personal details
- Born: James Samuel Thomas Stranahan; April 25, 1808 Peterboro, New York
- Died: September 3, 1898 (aged 90) Saratoga Springs, New York
- Resting place: Green-Wood Cemetery
- Party: Whig
- Spouse(s): Marrianne Fitch (m. 1837–1866) Clara Cornelia Harrison
- Children: Fitch J. Stranahan; Mary Stranahan Croxton
- Occupation: Shipping, Urban Development, Investment

James Samuel Thomas Stranahan (April 25, 1808 – September 3, 1898) was an American railroader and politician who served as a United States representative from New York, and a municipal official of the City of Brooklyn.

== Early years ==
Born in Peterboro, Madison County, New York, to Samuel Stranahan and Lynda Josselyn, he attended the common schools and Cazenovia Seminary. He founded the town of Florence in Oneida County in 1832 and engaged in the lumber business. He was postmaster of Florence and was a member of the New York State Assembly in 1838. He moved to Newark, New Jersey, in 1840 and engaged in building railroads.

== Politics ==
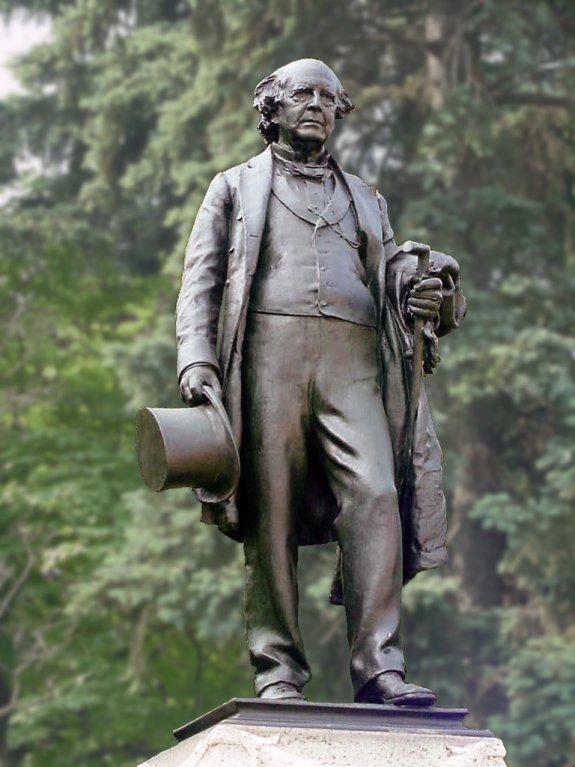
Statue of James S. T. Stranahan by Frederick MacMonnies, Prospect Park, Brooklyn

In 1844, Stranahan moved to Brooklyn, and was elected alderman of that city in 1848.

=== Congress ===
He was elected as a Whig candidate to the Thirty-fourth Congress and held office from March 4, 1855, to March 3, 1857. He was an unsuccessful candidate for reelection in 1856 to the Thirty-fifth Congress and was appointed as a member of the metropolitan police commission on January 1, 1857.

== Later career ==
He was a presidential elector on the Republican tickets in 1860 and 1888, and was the president of the Brooklyn Park Commission from 1860 to 1882, where he was instrumental in securing funding and political support for Brooklyn's Prospect Park. For his work in this regard, he became known as the "Baron Haussman of Brooklyn," a not-always-complimentary reference to the man who famously altered Paris's urban fabric.

Stranahan was a trustee of the New York and Brooklyn Bridge Company, serving as its President in 1885 and presided at its dedication on May 24, 1883. In the 1890s, Stranahan promoted the consolidation of City of Brooklyn into a Greater New York and was an active member in the Commission that framed the first charter for the City of Greater New York.

== Death ==
Stranahan died at his summer home in Saratoga Springs in 1898; interment was in Green-Wood Cemetery, Brooklyn.

U.S. House of Representatives
Preceded by Thomas W. Cumming	Member of the U.S. House of Representatives from New York's 2nd congressional district 1855–1857	Succeeded by George Taylor
