= Statue of Nathan Hale (Chicago) =

Bronze sculpture in Chicago, Illinois, U.S.

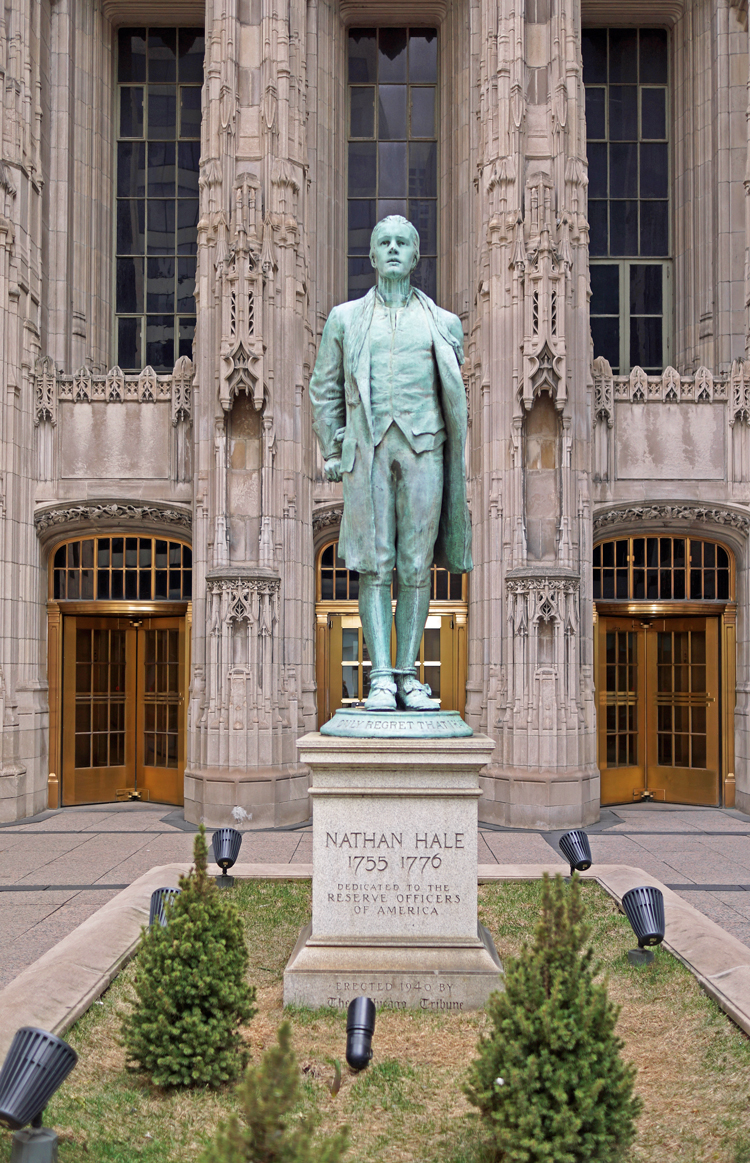
- The statue in 2013
- Artist: Bela Pratt (original); Guido Gargani (replica); Leo Weissenborn (architect)
- Completion date: June 4, 1940
- Medium: Bronze (sculpture); Granite (base)
- Movement: Colonial Revival
- Subject: Nathan Hale
- Dimensions: 1.8 m × 0.8 m (6 ft × 2.5 ft)
- Location: Tribune Tower Chicago, Illinois, U.S.; 41°53′26″N 87°37′26″W

Nathan Hale is a bronze statue of American Revolutionary War hero Nathan Hale (1755–1776) which stands in front of the Tribune Tower in Chicago, Illinois. The statue depicts Hale moments before he was executed for spying on the Kingdom of Great Britain. The original statue was sculpted in 1899 by Bela Pratt and installed at Yale University in 1914. The Chicago replica, created by Guido Gargani and installed in 1940, stands on a granite base designed by architect Leo Weissenborn. Originally located in the Nathan Hale Courtyard, also known as the Nathan Hale Court, the statue was relocated in the 2010s when the Tribune Tower was converted into residential units. It now faces the building along Michigan Avenue.

Chicago Tribune founder Colonel Robert R. McCormick, a World War I veteran who became a staunch isolationist during the lead up to World War II, led efforts to install a replica of Pratt's statue beginning in 1927. He had been a longtime supporter of the Reserve Officers' Training Corps (ROTC) program, which prepares students to enter the military. He wanted to install a statue of an American patriot and dedicate it to younger generations, who he hoped would show the same courage. The statue was first displayed at WGN's radio studio during a special event and the dedication and unveiling took place a few months later on June 4, 1940. The dedication, which included a parade of 10,000 ROTC cadets, was attended by tens of thousands of onlookers. The statue of Hale in Chicago is one of several replicas on display in the United States, including ones in New York City and Washington, D.C.

== History ==
=== Memorial plans ===
In 1776, Nathan Hale was executed by the Kingdom of Great Britain during the American Revolutionary War after spying for the United States. Over a century later, Americans began erecting monuments to colonial heroes and emulated colonial architecture to capture the spirit and culture of the Thirteen Colonies, a national expression called the Colonial Revival Movement. Colonel Robert R. McCormick, founder of the Chicago Tribune, served as commander of the 1st Battalion, 5th Field Artillery Regiment, with the 1st Infantry Division during World War I. Beginning in 1927, McCormick led efforts to erect a patriotic statue in Chicago. He believed Hale would be an inspiring hero to younger generations. After initial plans to erect the statue elsewhere in the city fell through, it was decided to install it in front of the front of the Tribune Tower, the home to McCormick's newspaper.

The statue was planned in the years leading up to World War II, a conflict on the minds of those involved in its dedication. The original statue was sculpted in 1899 by Bela Pratt and installed at Yale University, where Pratt, Hale, and McCormick had attended. The widow of Pratt granted permission for a replica to be created. The original statue was borrowed and a plaster cast was made. Brooklyn sculptor Guido Gargani was chosen to create the statue for McCormick. Leo Weissenborn was the architect who designed the pedestal.

McCormick first revealed the statue on George Washington's birthday, February 22, 1940, at an event in the WGN radio studio. General Stanley H. Ford discussed Washington's history and contributions to America's founding in front of hundreds of cadets from the Reserve Officers' Training Corps (ROTC), a program which McCormick greatly supported. Ford extolled the virtues of the ROTC program before McCormick unveiled the statue to those in the studio. The Pledge of Allegiance was recited by cadets from Lane Tech College Prep High School followed by the WRC Orchestra playing Virginia Rhapsody and Carry Me Back to Old Virginny. The event ended with the 600 cadets in attendance singing The Star-Spangled Banner.

=== Dedication ===
The dedication of the statue took place on June 4, 1940, by which time, the Wehrmacht had invaded or bombed multiple countries in Europe. One day before the dedication, the Luftwaffe had bombed Paris. An estimated 75,000 people lined the streets to watch 10,000 ROTC cadets march in a parade before the official unveiling of the statue. The parade of cadets began at Balbo Avenue, which had been renamed in 1933 in honor of fascist Italo Balbo after he visited Chicago. The group of cadets were from 27 area public schools and one parochial school. Cadets from Fenger Academy High School and Tilden High School had been inspected by military personnel and were chosen to lead the parade.

Onlookers watched as the cadets marched up Michigan Avenue, past the reviewing stand at Congress Plaza, and northward to Randolph Street, where all but the leading two schools ended their march. Amongst those in the reviewing stand were Mayor Edward Joseph Kelly, General Ford, Chicago Board of Education President James B. McCahey, Colonel William F. Morrison, who led the citywide ROTC program, businessman Howard P. Savage, who formerly led the American Legion, and numerous other local officials.

The cadets from Fenger and Tilden continued their march up Michigan Avenue, crossing the Chicago River, until ending at the Tribune Tower. WGN broadcast from the location beginning at 1:15pm, attended by the officials from the reviewing stand who had joined the ceremony, and thousands of people watching from Michigan Avenue. A chorus of 120 students from Hirsch Metropolitan High School and Lindblom Technical High School sang Adoramus Te Christe followed by a speech from Ford. "The democracy of youth passed in review today as a living tribute to the R.O.T.C., giving a reflection of the heroic youth of the past as represented by Nathan Hale, whose solemn and inspiring words are treasured by all of America as one of the noblest of lessons", Ford told the crowd.

A local music teacher sang Recessional before the speech by McCormick, who was introduced as "the father of the R.O.T.C. in the city of Chicago", due to his and his newspaper's longtime support of the program. McCormick, a staunch isolationist, addressed the audience, speaking of the importance of preparedness for those entering the U.S. armed forces, highlighting the large role played by the ROTC program in achieving this readiness. He also spoke of the importance of U.S. military personnel dying only because they were fighting for the U.S., and not for another country's cause. After his speech, one of the cadets led the crowd in the Pledge of Allegiance.

The last speaker was William Warren Sweet, a professor at the University of Chicago, who spoke about Hale's biography. Towards the end of his speech, Sweet said "I am sure in presenting this replica of the Nathan Hale statue at Yale University to the city of Chicago, picturing Nathan Hale on the way to the gallows, it has not been the donor's purpose to glorify war...Rather this statue has been placed here that it may serve as an inspiration to the young men and women of this and future generations that they, too, might be imbued with that highest patriotism, which is willing to completely eliminate self for the highest good of mankind." Two cadets then unveiled the statue as a WGN musician sang The Star-Spangled Banner. This was followed by a school choir singing Deep River and a wreath laid at the statue by students from Chicago's Nathan Hale Elementary School.

=== Later history ===
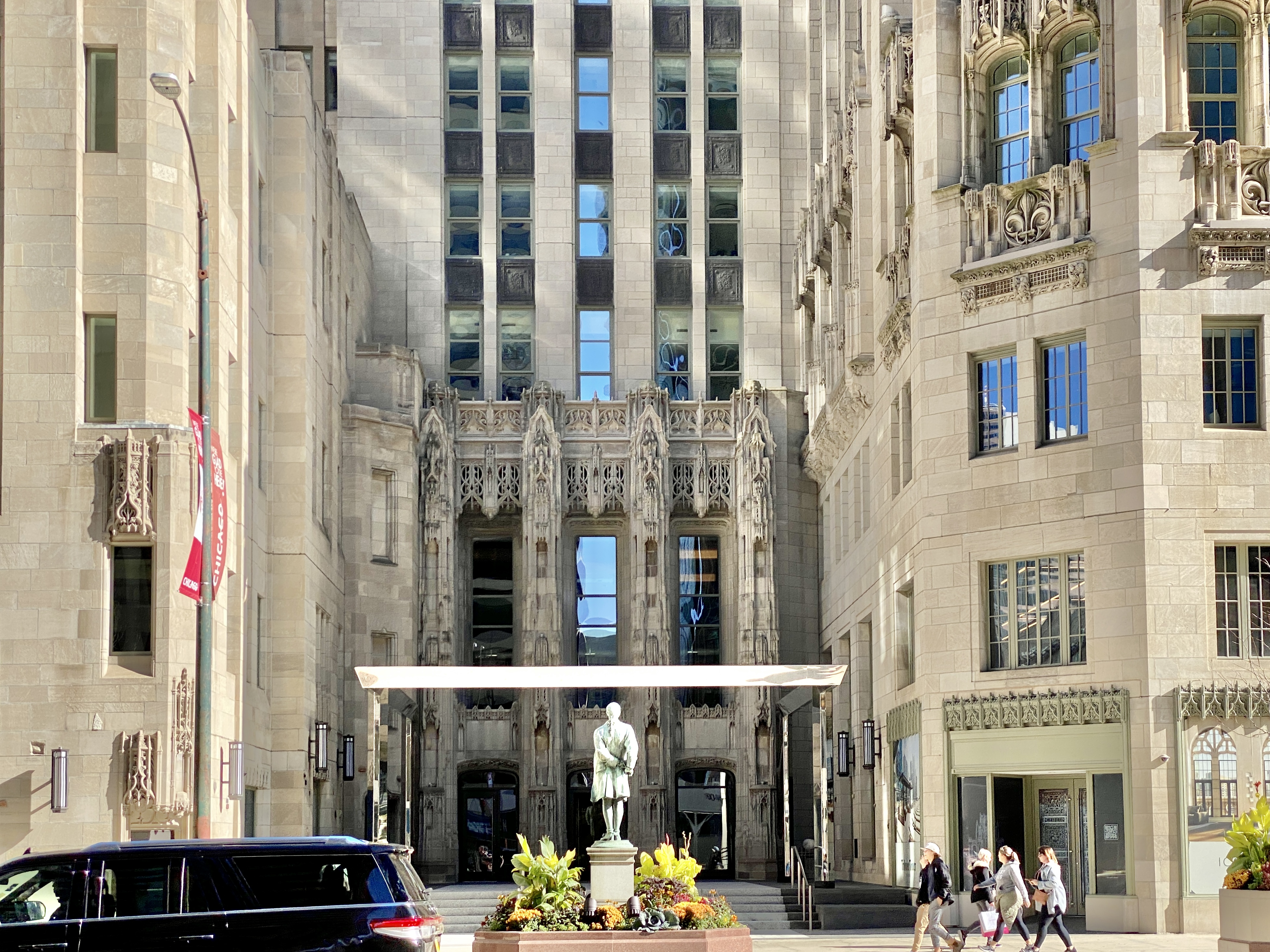
The statue was moved and now faces the Tribune Tower, as seen here in 2022, after the conversion of the building into residential units.

Beginning in 2015, the statue was included in an audio art project called "Statue Stories Chicago", whereby the background of select sculptures and other inanimate objects of interest are available to the public via a telephone call. After scanning a QR code at the Hale statue, a script written by Chicago Tribune theater critic Chris Jones is read by actor Jon Michael Hill. The Hale statue is one of ten statues in Chicago dedicated to people related to the Revolutionary War, most of which are located downtown or along the Chicago River. It is one of several replicas throughout the United States based on Pratt's work. Additional locations where a replica has been installed include Fort Nathan Hale and Bristol's First Congregational Church in Connecticut, the Robert F. Kennedy Department of Justice Building in Washington, D.C., the Phillips Academy in Massachusetts, the George Bush Center for Intelligence in Virginia, and The Yale Club of New York City. Other statues of Hale have been sculpted by Frederick William MacMonnies, Karl Gerhardt, William Ordway Partridge, and Lee Lawrie.

When the Tribune Tower was vacated and converted into residential units, part of a $1 billion construction project that will include the Tribune East Tower, the statue was moved to a space along Michigan Avenue where it is accessible to people with disabilities. Preservation Chicago has called for the courtyard and the Tribune Tower's adjoining structures, which includes the WGN Radio Building, Chicago Tribune Printing Building, and WGN TV Building, to be included in the property's landmark status.

== Location and design ==
The statue is located in front of the Tribune Tower in Chicago, Illinois, near the DuSable Bridge. It stands just outside the Nathan Hale Courtyard, also known as the Nathan Hale Court, a small public plaza which faces Michigan Avenue. In addition to the courtyard, the Tribune Tower's lobby is also named after Hale.

The bronze statue of Hale is 6-feet (1.8 m) tall and 2.5-feet (0.8 m) wide. It stands on a granite base that is 3.5-feet (1.1 m) tall and 3-feet (0.9 m) in diameter. Hale is depicted staring straight ahead, feet bound, moments before his execution, when he said "I only regret that I have but one life to lose for my country." His attire includes britches, vest, long coat, and shoes adorned with large buckles. His long hair is pulled back into a ponytail. Inscriptions on the bottom of the statue and the front of the base include:

B. L. PRATT

I REGRET THAT I HAVE BUT ONE LIFE TO LOSE FOR MY COUNTRY

NATHAN HALE / 1755–1776 / DEDICATED TO THE / RESERVE OFFICERS / OF AMERICA / ERECTED 1940 BY / THE CHICAGO TRIBUNE

== See also ==
- Captain Nathan Hale Monument
- Statue of Nathan Hale (New York City)
- Statue of Nathan Hale (Washington, D.C.)
