= Statue of James S. T. Stranahan =

Statue in Brooklyn, New York, U.S.

James S. T. Stranahan statue
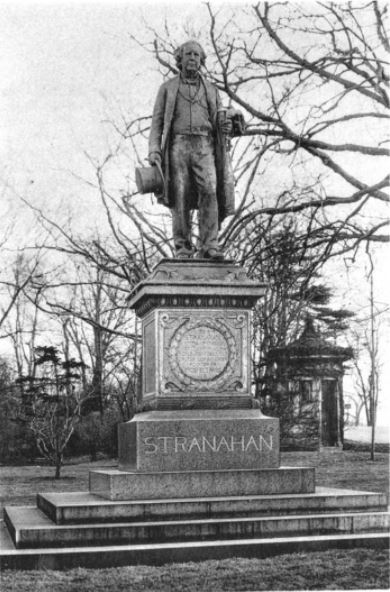
- Statue of James S. T. Stranahan, c. 1923
- Interactive map of James S. T. Stranahan statue
- Location: Prospect Park, Brooklyn, New York City, United States
- Coordinates: 40°40′19.5″N 73°58′10″W
- Designer: Frederick William MacMonnies (sculptor); Stanford White (architect)
- Fabricator: E. Gruet
- Material: Bronze; Knoxville marble Pink granite
- Height: 92.5 inches (2.35 m) (excluding pedestal)
- Dedicated date: June 6, 1891
- Dedicated to: James S. T. Stranahan

J.S.T. Stranahan is a bronze statue in Brooklyn's Prospect Park in New York City. Designed by Frederick William MacMonnies and erected in 1891 near the park's entrance at Grand Army Plaza, it honors James S. T. Stranahan, a businessman from Brooklyn who served on the city's park commission and was instrumental in Prospect Park's creation. The statue is considered one of MacMonnies' finest works and was praised for its realism. An inscription on the pedestal of the statue includes the Latin phrase LECTOR SI MONUMENTUM REQUIRIS CIRCUMSPICE ("Reader, if you seek his monument, look around you") which also marks the tomb of Christopher Wren.

== History ==
James S. T. Stranahan was an alderman and parks commissioner from Brooklyn who championed the creation of Prospect Park, which was completed in 1873 during his tenure as commissioner. The idea of erecting a statue of Stranahan was first presented by Richard Salter Storrs in 1888 during a dinner held in Stranahan's honor. Fundraising efforts started shortly thereafter, and after enough money had been raised, sculptor Frederick William MacMonnies was commissioned to design the statue. The statue would be MacMonnies's first commission in either Brooklyn or New York City. The statue was cast at the foundry of E. Gruet around 1891 and dedicated on June 6 of that year. MacMonnies's statue stood atop a pedestal designed by architect Stanford White. The dedication was attended by Stranahan himself and, when offered to unveil the statue, he turned down the offer and instead allowed MacMonnies the honor. Storrs gave the oration at the dedication. The statue has stood in Prospect Park since its unveiling.

== Design ==
The bronze statue stands atop a pedestal consisting of Knoxville marble and pink granite and is located near the park entrance at the intersection of Flatbush Avenue and East Drive. The pedestal stands atop four receding steps. Stranahan, dressed in normal attire for the era including a bow tie, frock coat, and waistcoat, stands with his left foot forward, with his right arm holding a top hat by his side and a cane and topcoat in his left. The following inscription is carved into the front of the pedestal: "JAMES S. T. / STRANAHAN / A CITIZEN OF BROOKLYN / HONORED FOR MANY / NOBLE SERVICES MOST / GRATEFULLY AS CHIEF / FOUNDER OF / PROSPECT PARK / 1891 [–] LECTOR SI / MONUMENTUM / REQUIRIS / CIRCUMSPICE [–] STRANAHAN". (The Latin phrase translates to "Reader, if you seek my monument, look about you" and was taken from the tomb of Christopher Wren, architect of St. Paul's Cathedral.) Additionally, the rear of the pedestal reads "ERECTED BY HIS / FELLOW CITIZENS / DURING HIS LIFETIME / AND UNVEILED IN HIS PRESENCE JUNE VI – MDCCCXCI". Near the base of the statue on its rear are the foundry marks.

The statue has a height of 92.5 inches (2.35 m), while the pedestal is 88 inches (2.2 m) tall. The statue's base is a 27-inch (0.69 m) square, while the base of the pedestal measures 75 inches (1.9 m) by 68 inches (1.7 m). The square base underneath the pedestal has sides measuring 168 inches (4.3 m) and the combined base and pedestal have a height of 101 inches (2.6 m).

In addition to the statue, an informational panel on Stranahan is located inside the park's Picnic House.

=== Analysis ===
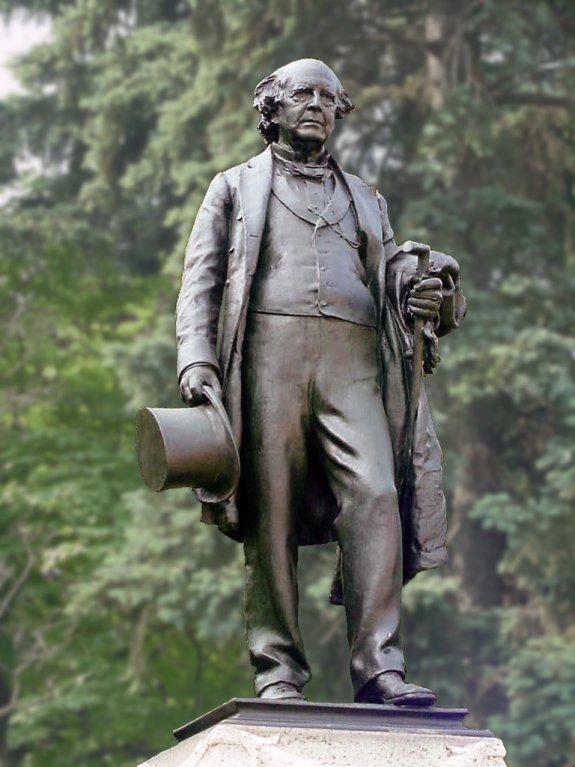
Closeup of the statue

Speaking of the statue in a 2008 book on monuments in Brooklyn, academic Elmer Sprague noted that "[b]y portraying him without a cloak, MacMonnies set a new style for post-Civil War civilian statues in America". A 1917 art guide to New York City stated that "[t]he Stranahan statue epitomizes the movement fathered by these pioneers in their stand against the neo-classic, and as such its importance as a veritable contribution to the sum total of knowledge in the art of sculpture cannot be overestimated". A 1906 article in Munsey's Magazine discussing MacMonnies's works calls the Stranahan and Hale statues as "[t]he most successful of [his] portrait statues", claiming that the Stranahan statue "merits even more consideration than that of Hale". A 1902 review in the magazine Brush and Pencil said the following regarding the statue: "About the Stranahan statue, there has scarcely been a dissenting voice among critics as to its merit. It is one of the noblest works executed by an American sculptor. The realism of every-day costume in no way detracts from its beauty and impressiveness. The figure is firmly planted on its feet, and both pose and countenance convey the character of the man commemorated." Contemporary American sculptor Lorado Taft gave the statue high marks in a review, among other things citing the successful execution of the subject's costume, especially his silk hat. Regarding the realism of the statue, Taft gave the following: "Nothing truer has been done in our day. While there is a sculptural bigness in the arrangement as a whole and an unconventional freedom throughout, one is struck above all with the incisive characterization; the personality of the man is the first and last impression. You forget everything else. He is real. He is alive."

In late 1891, MacMonnies would win a second place medal at the Paris Salon for his works on both this statue and his statue of Nathan Hale. At the time, second place was the highest award that could be bestowed to non-French citizens, and MacMonnies's victory was the first time an American had won the award.

== See also ==
- 1891 in art
