= Clara Harrison Stranahan =

American author (1831–1905)

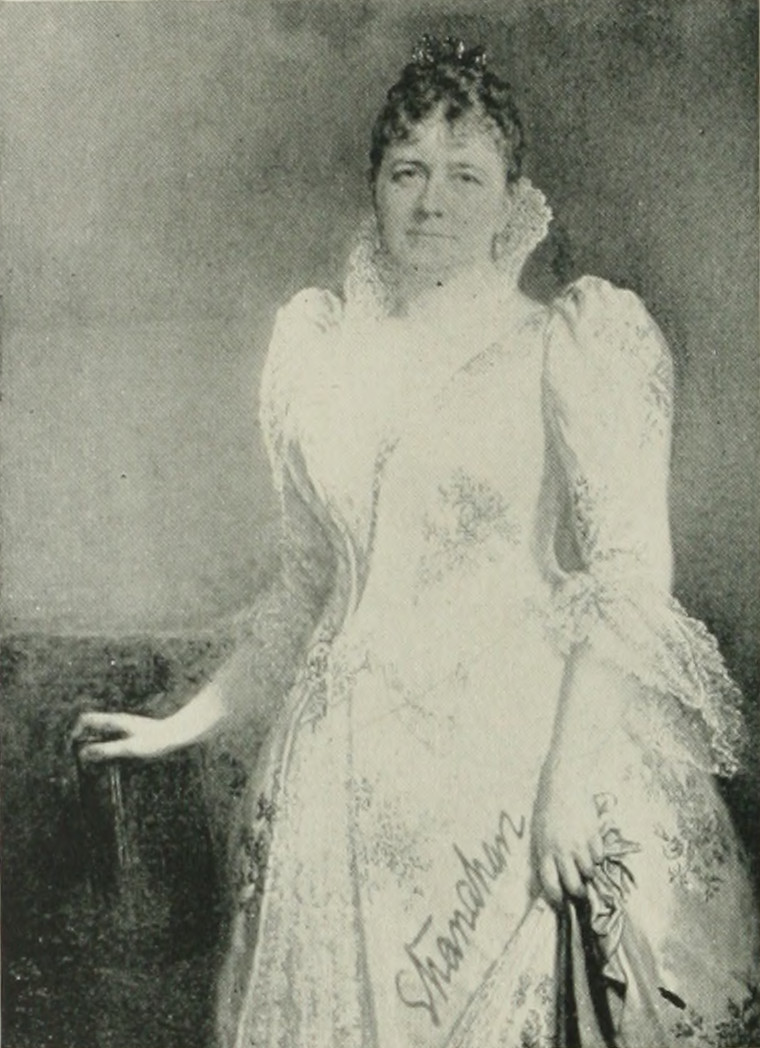
- Portrait photo from A Woman of the Century
- Born: Clara Cornelia Harrison; April 9, 1831; Westfield, Massachusetts, U.S.
- Died: January 22, 1905 (aged 73); Brooklyn, New York, U.S.
- Resting place: Green-Wood Cemetery
- Education: Troy Female Seminary; Mount Holyoke Seminary
- Occupations: Author; college founder
- Spouse: James S. T. Stranahan (m. 1870; died 1898)
- Writing career
- Pen name: C. H. Stranahan
- Notable work: A History of French Painting

Clara Harrison Stranahan (née , Harrison; pen name, C. H. Stranahan; April 9, 1831 – January 22, 1905) was an American author and the founder of Barnard College. Long identified with the higher education of women in the United States, she was at one time called "the best educated woman in the United States." She taught in Troy, Ohio and in Brooklyn, New York, and donated US$25,000 to University of Michigan as a memorial of her father, Seth Harrison. Stranahan was a founder and a trustee of Barnard College. She was a frequent contributor to magazines and other periodicals, and was the author of a work upon French painting. Stranahan was vice-president of the Emma Willard Association, composed of alumnae of the Troy Female Seminary, and a member of the Daughters of the American Revolution.

== Early life and education ==
Clara Cornelia Harrison was born in Westfield, Massachusetts, April 9, 1831. Descended of an old New England family, her parents were Seth and Letia (Viets) Harrison. In her early childhood, her father took his family to northern Ohio for a period of five years, from 1836 to 1841, and there his children had the benefit of the excellent schools of that region. Stranahan was influenced by both Mary Lyon and Emma Willard in her education, spending one year in Mount Holyoke Seminary (1849), going thereafter to the Troy Female Seminary, where she completed the higher course of study instituted by Mrs. Willard.

== Career ==
Stranahan had shown some ability as a writer, and as early as her graduation from the Troy Seminary, some of her productions were selected for publication. Thereafter, she published some fugitive articles, a poem or a monograph, such as "The Influence of the Medici," in the National Quarterly Review, December, 1863. Her best work was A History of French Painting from its Earliest to its Latest Practice (New York City, 1888). She wrote many articles of interest to newspapers, and her opinions carried weight and influence.

Before her marriage, she was one of the leaders in educational circles in Brooklyn, and for a number of years, was principal of a private seminary for the higher education of young women, which had an enrollment of 200 pupils, and 14 teachers and professors in its various departments.

She married Hon. James S. T. Stranahan ("First Citizen of Brooklyn") in July, 1870. She was again before the public as a member of the Board of Lady Managers of the World's Columbian Exposition (1893) on behalf of the Empire State, and was chosen vice-president of the Board. She took a firm stand in opposition to the opening of the fair on Sundays, and was the only member of the board who voted in favor of closing the exposition on the Sabbath. She also served as a member of the committee on art, and of the committee on the post office and Drum Beat, the latter a paper issued daily during the continuance of the fair. From the post office, many hundred letters of greatly varied character were distributed. A volume of autograph letters, chiefly from statesmen conspicuous at that time, were collected and bound through her agency, and brought several hundred dollars into the treasury.

Stranahan was an active promoter of educational interests. She was a founder of Barnard College, and served as a trustee from its inception in 1889 until her death in 1905. She was also vice-president of the alumnae association of her alma mater. She was an ardent advocate of the higher education of women. She became widely known throughout the country as one of the most prominent members of the Daughters of the American Revolution and was elected one of its vice-presidents-general. Stranahan gave her influence in support of the charities of the city, and for a quarter of a century, was president of the Kings County Visiting Committee of the State Charities Aid Association. For 27 years, she was corresponding secretary of the Society for the Aid of Friendless Women and Children.

== Death ==
Clara Harrison Stranahan died February 12, 1905, at her home in Brooklyn, of apoplexy, and was buried at Green-Wood Cemetery.

== Literary reception ==
A History of French Painting received high praise in artistic and literary circles in the US and in Europe. In a review of the work by Mr. McKeleway of the Eagle, he wrote:

"Of the things which she might have done and still have had her book pass current as a history, Mrs. Stranahan did neither. She might have contented herself with the dates and names and general allusions, or she might. have made a pleasant little trip along the path of French art development, picking up a few flowers here and there, tying them into chapters and calling them a history. There are few cases in all literature in which the application of the word history is not to a great extent a sort of beneficent libel, but that of Mrs. Stranahan's production is a most notable exception. It needs the eye of no artist, either amateur or professional, to see at a glance what she had to do. There is not a page of the book that does not tell its own eloquent story of toil, which would have shaken the purposes of any but the most resolute of women. The work would have been arduous enough if all the materials which she has utilized had been, by some impossible literary legerdemain, placed at her disposal with due reference to chronology and sequence. What she would still have had to do, even under those conditions, would have been exacting enough to justify the highest praise, for the manner in which she has done it.

"Those who know how busy a woman she is, in other than a literary sense, are at a loss to comprehend how she found time to search out what she wanted, to wander among the shadows of the centuries that are gone, and to give them a substance as tangible as if they belonged to yesterday. Tributes to her energy and determination might be made as strong as words can make them, but they are entitled to no precedence over other acknowledgments, upon which her claim is just as clear: the intuitive perceptions of a woman have been reinforced by a grasp and virility usually incident to a 'masculine intelligence. As a matter of fact, many have fallen into the error of supposing that the name on the title page, C. H. Stranahan, belonged to one of the sterner sex. There is not the least sign of uncertainty about the touch anywhere between the covers of the book. It is affirmative, vigorous and decisive, without a suggestion of dogmatism. 1f the material that is to be lifted into place is right, it is handled with a delicacy that is not effeminate; if it is ponderous, there is always in reserve for it a surprising degree of strength.

"In her sense of relative importance of things, the author is exceedingly fortunate. Liliputians are not exaggerated into Goliaths, and giants are not dwarfed into pigmies. It is impossible not to admire the discrimination which has been shown throughout. Evidently Mrs. Stranahan’s first care was to see that her own powers of assimilation were in excellent working order. While it is palpable that her appetite for relevant facts was perfectly omnivorous, it is equally manifest that nothing was hastily devoured. It is one thing to set a trap for the artistic honor of by-gone times in France; it is another thing to catch it. Then comes the exercise of the supreme faculty of portrayal, and it is here that Mrs. Stranahan gives a momentum to her work which sends it with a sweep into the front rank. There is much in what she herself says about the true art that is suggestive of her purpose and of the manner in which she fulfills them."

== Selected works ==
- A History of French Painting, 1888
