= World War I Memorial (Atlantic City, New Jersey) =

War memorial in New Jersey, US

- U.S. National Register of Historic Places
- New Jersey Register of Historic Places
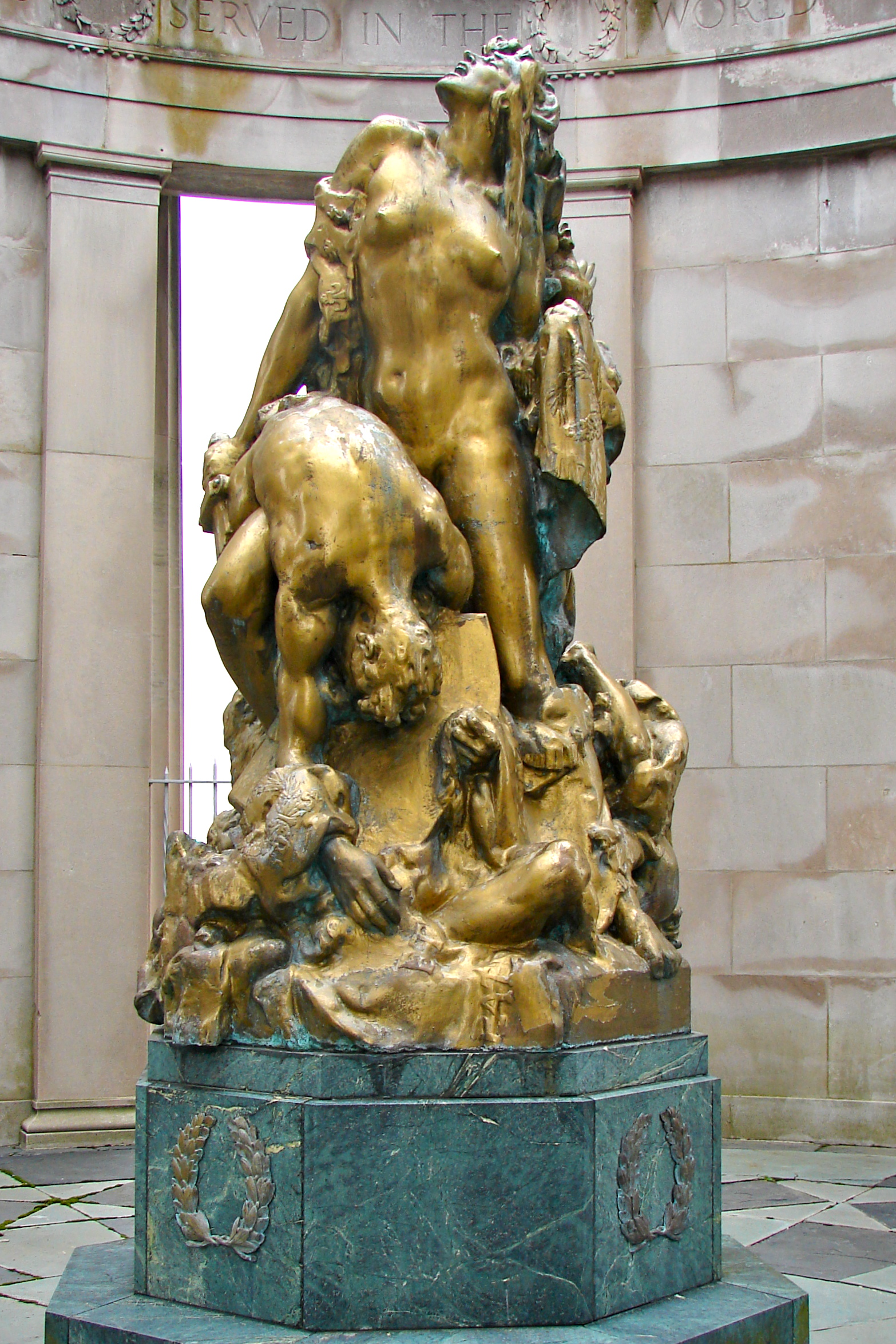
- Liberty in Distress by Frederick W. MacMonnies

- Location within Atlantic County, New Jersey Location within New Jersey Location within the United States
- Location: O'Donnell Parkway, S. Albany and Ventnor Avenues, Atlantic City, New Jersey
- Coordinates: 39°21′5″N 74°27′19″W
- Area: less than one acre
- Built: 1922
- Architect: Diebitch, Emil, Inc.; MacMonnies, F.
- Architectural style: Greek Temple
- NRHP reference No.: 81000388
- NJRHP No.: 407

Significant dates
- Added to NRHP: August 28, 1981
- Designated NJRHP: July 2, 1981

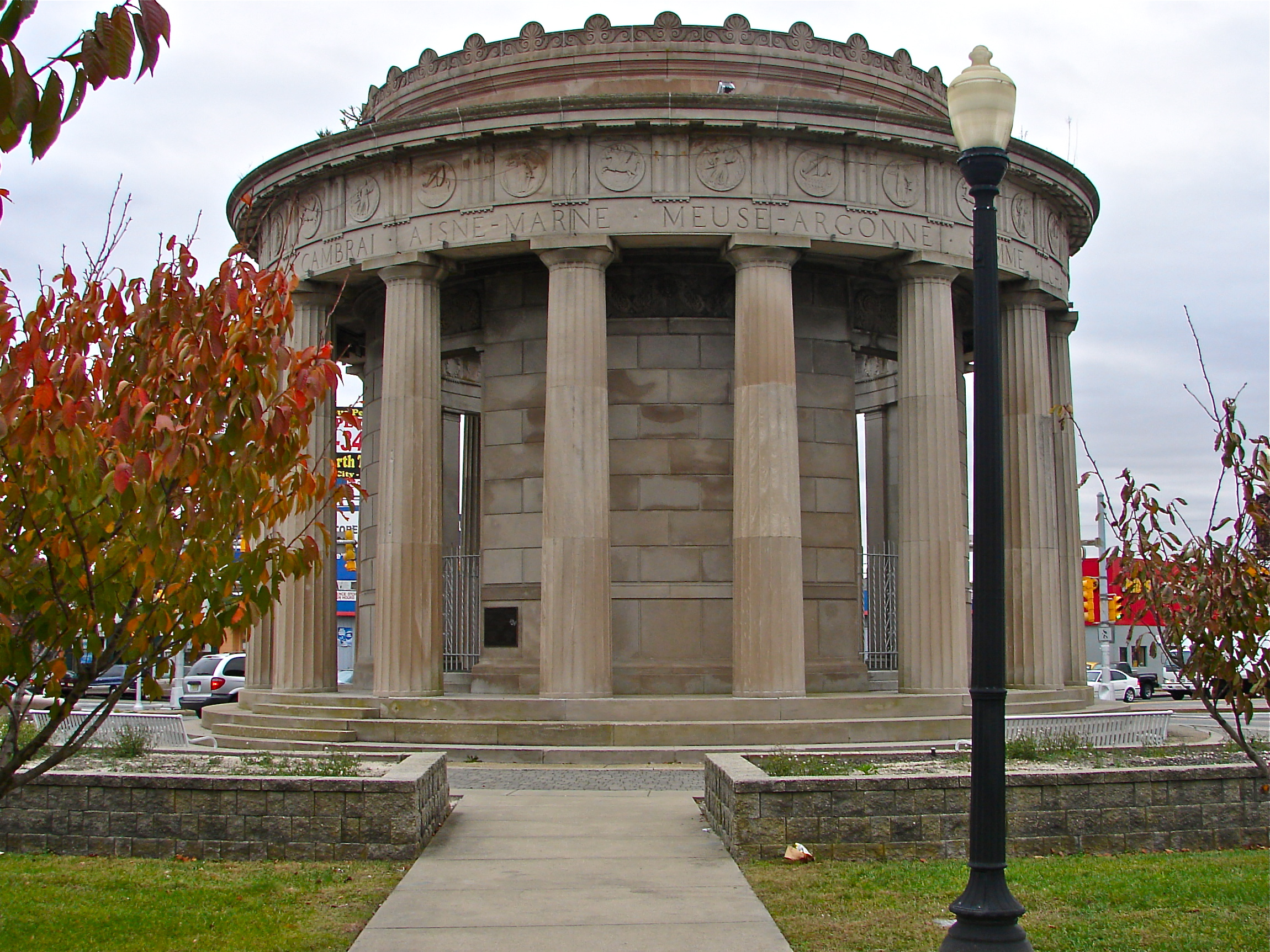
View from the southeast

The World War I Memorial is located in Atlantic City, Atlantic County, New Jersey, United States. The memorial was built in 1922, and added to the National Register of Historic Places on August 28, 1981.

The rotunda houses a 9-foot (2.7 m) bronze statue titled Liberty in Distress by Frederick W. MacMonnies.

Inside the rotunda there are four medallions (Army, Navy, Marines, and Aviation) that alternate around the circumference of the frieze. The names of battles in which Atlantic City soldiers fought are inscribed upon the architrave.

== See also ==
- National Register of Historic Places listings in Atlantic County, New Jersey
- Temple of Vesta, Tivoli
