= Bacchante and Infant Faun =

Statue by Frederick William MacMonnies

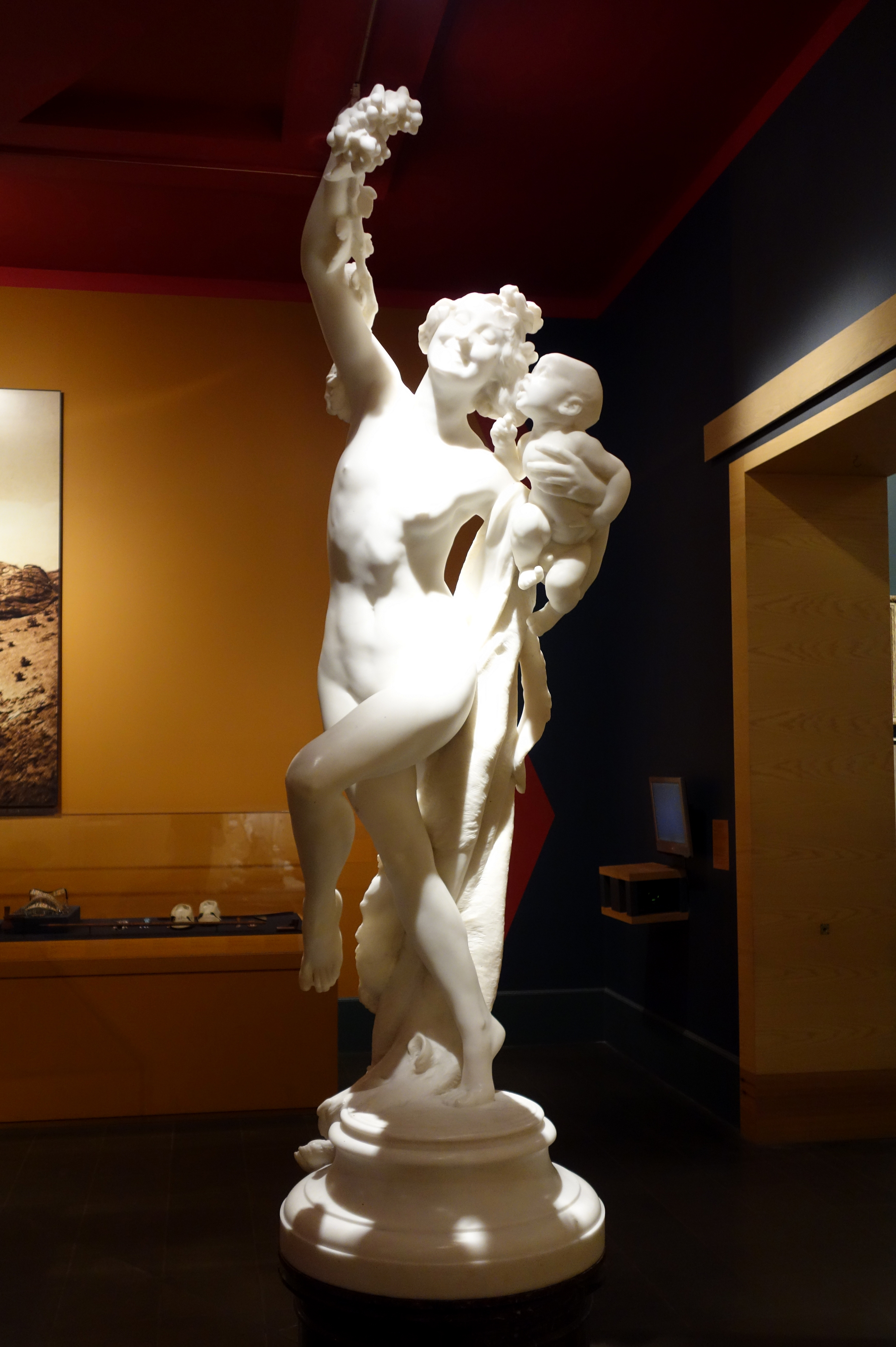
- Marble version at the Brooklyn Museum
- Artist: Frederick William MacMonnies
- Year: 1894
- Medium: Bronze
- Subject: Woman celebrating while holding an infant
- Dimensions: 210 cm × 75.6 cm × 80 cm (84 in × 29.75 in × 31.5 in)
- Location: Metropolitan Museum of Art

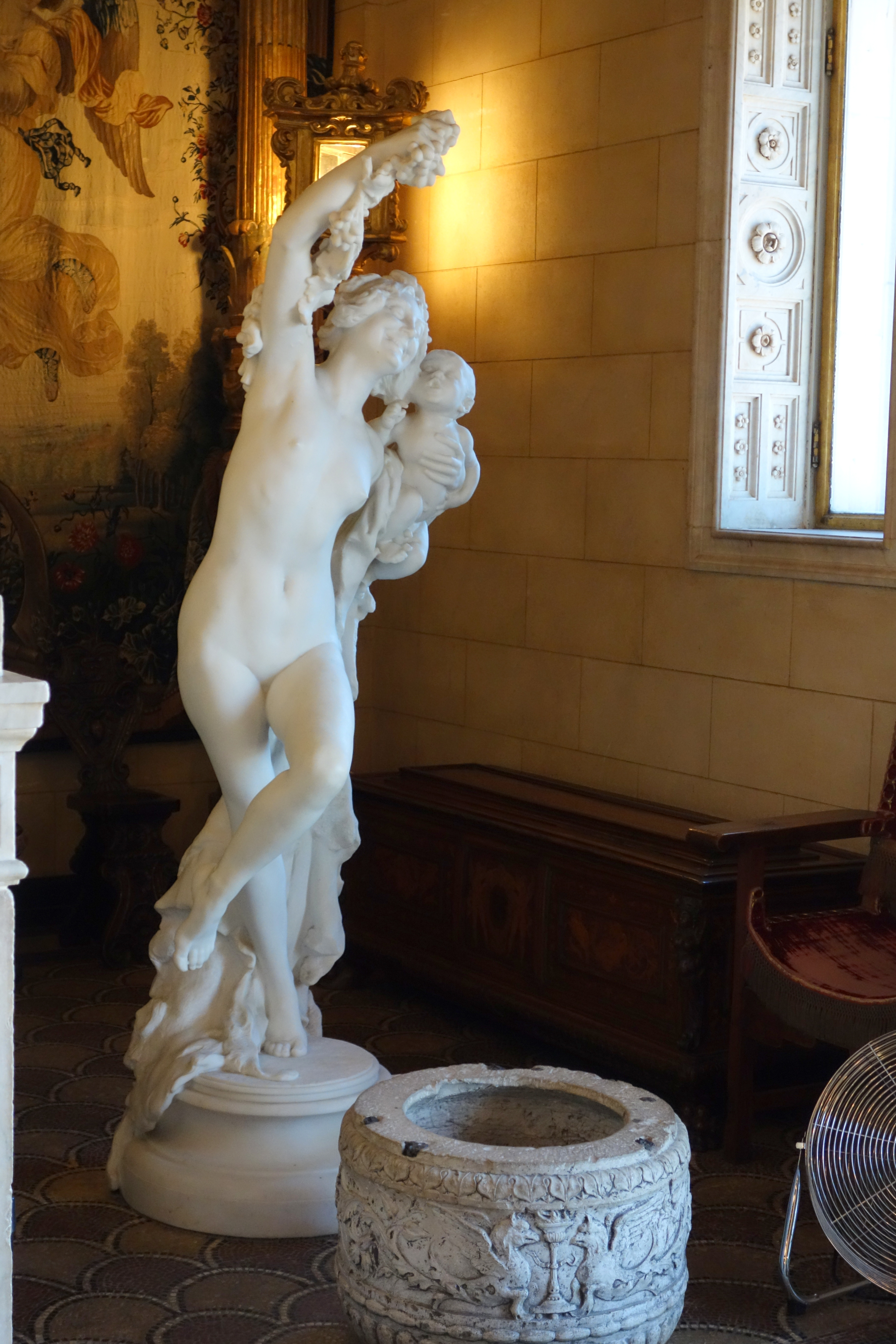
Version at Hearst Castle in San Simeon, California

Bacchante and Infant Faun is a bronze sculpture modeled by American artist Frederick William MacMonnies in Paris in 1893–1894.

The original bronze cast, in the collection of the Metropolitan Museum of Art ("The Met"), was produced in 1894 and measures 84 inches (2.1 m) x 29.75 inches (0.756 m) x 31.5 inches (0.80 m). Many reductions were cast in two different sizes due to its popularity, and versions were also created in marble.

== History ==
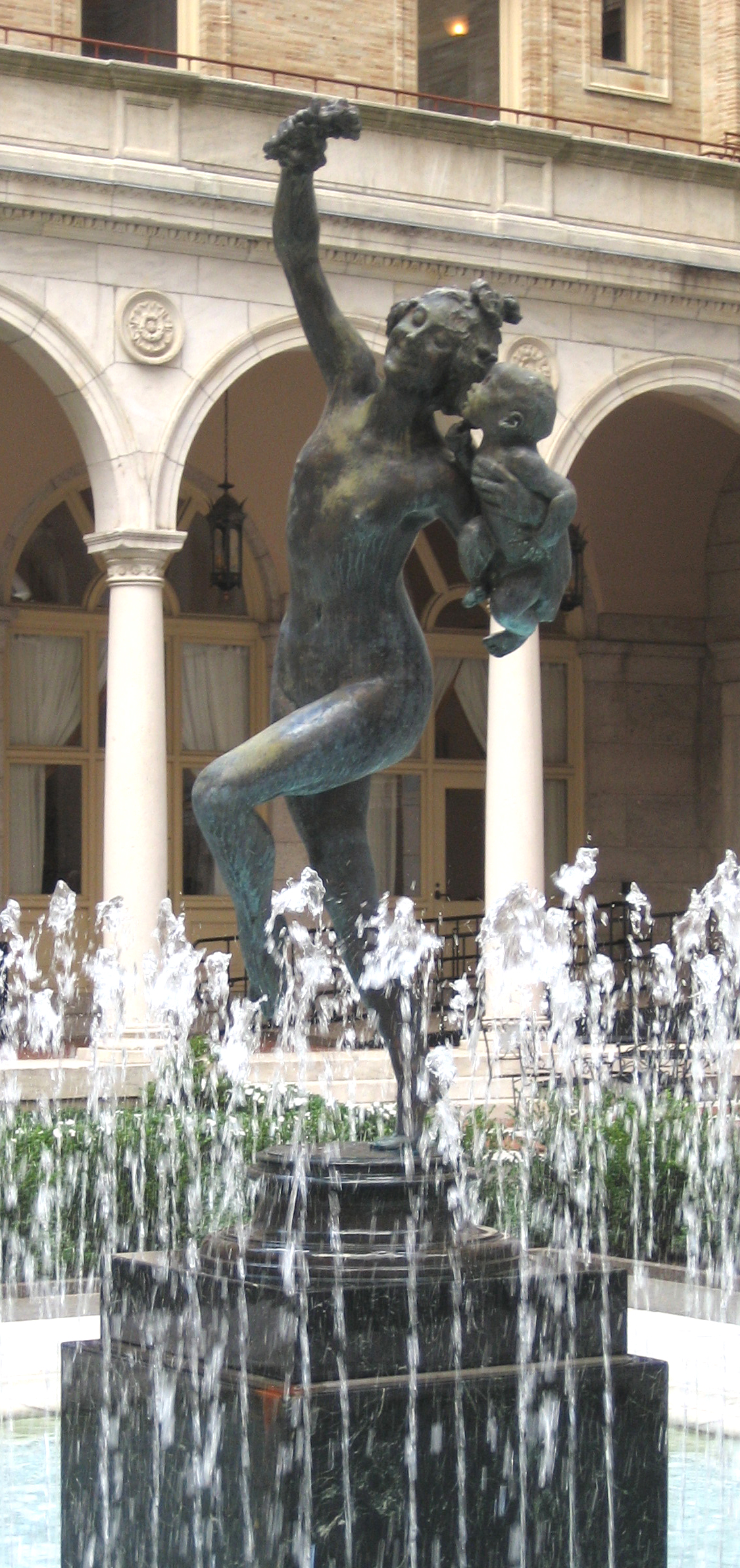
Bronze replica in the Boston Central Library courtyard

The life-size nude, depicting the joyous, fluid movement of a woman (a "bacchante") celebrating while holding an infant, was exhibited at the 1894 Paris Salon to great acclaim. MacMonnies gifted this original casting to his friend, architect Charles Follen McKim, whose firm was building Boston's new public library in Copley Square. McKim offered Bacchante as a gift to the Boston Public Library (BPL) in 1896, to be placed in the fountain of the library's courtyard. It was intended as a memorial for his second wife, Julia Amory Appleton McKim, who had died in childbirth in 1887.

Both the library board of trustees and the Boston Art Commission accepted the gift, and the majority of public opinion endorsed the placement of Bacchante at the library after it was temporarily installed in November 1896. However, the Woman's Christian Temperance Union, the Watch and Ward Society, the Young Men’s Christian Association, and local religious groups caused such a sustained public outcry citing its perceived "drunken indecency" that McKim withdrew the gift in May 1897, to save the BPL from further controversy.

McKim then gave the statue to the Metropolitan Museum of Art in New York City. The controversy had followed the statue to New York, where there were heated protests and much discussion, but the trustees of the Met decided to stand firm on their acceptance of the artwork.

Shortly after the appearance of Bacchante at the 1894 Salon, France attempted to purchase the original casting for its national art collection, the first time an American sculptor was accorded this honor. MacMonnies already had plans for the original, so he produced a replica which was installed in France's Luxembourg Museum of contemporary art.

A later full-sized bronze casting, originally purchased from MacMonnies' studio by transportation magnate Charles Yerkes, was purchased at auction and loaned to the Museum of Fine Arts, Boston by George Robert White in 1910. It was later bequeathed to the MFA in 1930 by White's sister, Mrs. Harriet J. Bradbury, and is now on display in the MFA's new Arts of the Americas Wing.

Almost a century after the original controversy, the Boston Public Library reversed itself and commissioned its own bronze copy, which was cast from the MFA copy in 1993-1994 and installed in 1999. This replica is now displayed surrounded by a fountain in the center of the garden courtyard of the BPL, as had been originally intended by the donor.

== Other versions ==
According to the Metropolitan Museum of Art, there are also four smaller 68-inch (1,700 mm) bronze versions, two larger marble replicas, and three other over-lifesize bronzes at known locations.

The two versions in marble were slightly taller than the original. Lionskin drapery and trailing vines were added to the side of the figure, to strengthen the stone, which has less tensile strength than bronze metal. One of these large marbles was purchased by the Brooklyn Museum in 1906. The other was produced in 1914 for the house of the mother of William Randolph Hearst, in Pleasanton, California; it is now at Hearst Castle, in San Simeon, California.

Other large bronze copies reside at the Museum of Fine Arts Houston, and at the National Portrait Gallery in Washington DC.

The press coverage and notoriety around the refused gift allowed MacMonnies to sell many reduced-size replicas. Copies of the Bacchante in bronze or marble of various sizes can now be found in the permanent collections of many museums in the United States and France.

For example, a reduced-size version of the sculpture rendered in bronze resides in a private collection in Provenance, New York. The miniature rendition (which stands 30.125 inches (76.52 cm) tall) of the work that once struggled to find a home sold for $4,800 at a 2009 auction.

== Cultural references ==
The popular statue inspired other artists to produce related artworks, including silver spoons, popular songs, a dance step, and a ballet, all based on the theme of a bacchante. In 1915, artist John Sloan produced the etching Mars and Venus, portraying the Roman god of war as a New York police officer, and a drunken bacchante leaning for support on a US Post Office mailbox.
