= Rohallion =

Coordinates: 40.362°N 74.006°W

Rohallion Estate (pronounced roh-HAL-ee-on, Scottish Gaelic: Ràth Chailleann, 'The Fort of the Caledonians') is an estate in Rumson, New Jersey. The estate house was built in 1887 on a lot originally 64 acres (26 ha). The property owner, Edward Dean Adams, was President of the Niagara Falls Power Company and a descendant of U.S. Presidents John Adams and John Quincy Adams, and was featured on the cover of Time magazine on May 27, 1929. He commissioned Stanford White to undertake the design of the house based on a castle in Perthshire, Scotland, also named Rohallion, where Edward Adams and his family had resided.

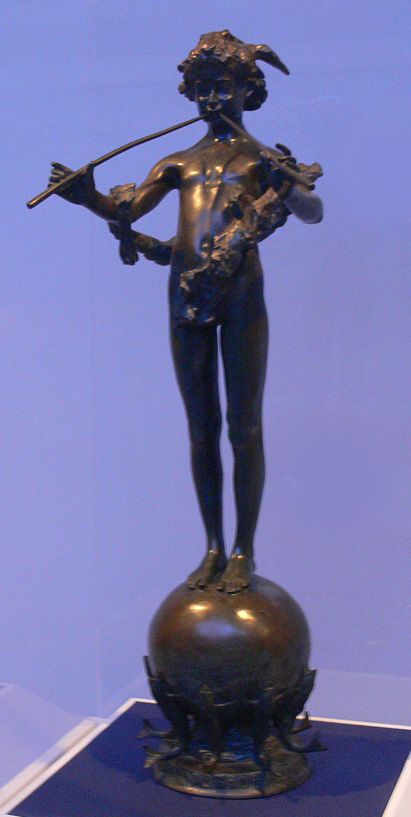
Pan of Rohallion by Frederick William MacMonnies, 1890

Built in White's traditional shingle style, Adams undertook a substantial remodeling and expansion of the house in the winter of 1913-14. The building was stuccoed after the remodeling. The house was sold to Robert V. White, a Rumson councilman, who remodeled the house in Tudor Revival style in the 1930s. The estate was further subdivided from its original 68 acres to 5 acres today.

The Adamses traveled abroad frequently, and would bring back specimens for Rohallion's expansive gardens.

The carriage house was also designed by Stanford White, and contained a clock tower similar to his firm's clock tower in the Newport Casino. The tower contained the Rohallion Chimes, cast for Adams to a scale he designed. The carriage house was badly damaged by fire in 1961, and the remnant is visible at 8 North Rohallion Drive.

== Pan of Rohallion ==
Pan of Rohallion is an 1890 fountain figure statue of the god Pan that was commissioned for the house and is now in the Metropolitan Museum of Art. Designed by Frederick William MacMonnies, a student of Augustus Saint-Gaudens, it became one of his best-known works and many replicas have been made.
