= Statue of Nathan Hale (New York City) =

Statue by Frederick William MacMonnies

Nathan Hale
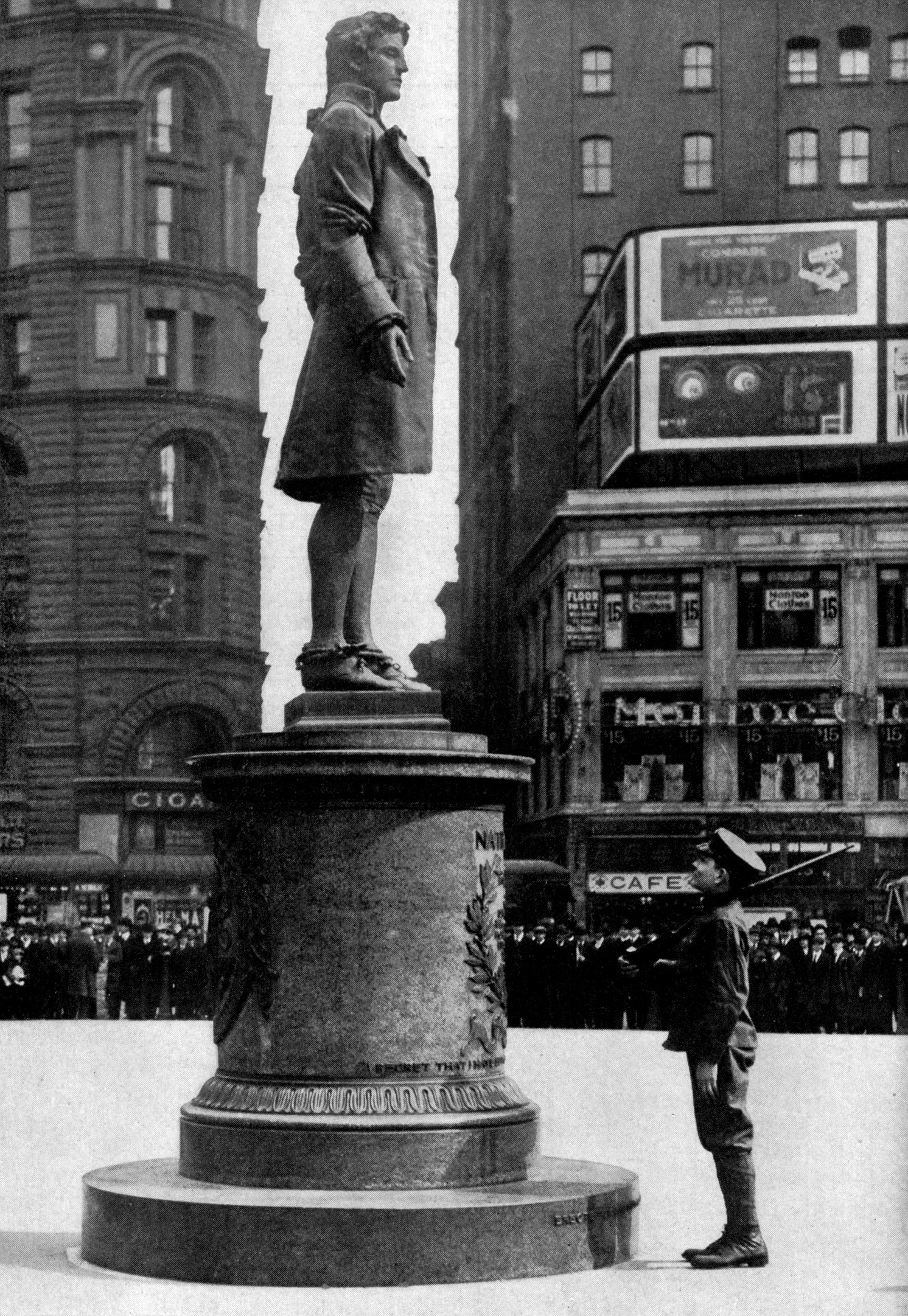
- Nathan Hale as photographed by the International Film Service and published in The National Geographic Magazine in 1917
- Artist: Frederick William MacMonnies
- Year: 1893
- Completion date: 25 November 1893
- Type: Sculpture
- Medium: Bronze
- Subject: Nathan Hale
- Location: City Hall Park, New York City

Nathan Hale is a bronze sculpture of Nathan Hale, an American Patriot, soldier and spy for the Continental Army during the American Revolutionary War, unveiled by the Sons of the Revolution in the State of New York during the celebration of Evacuation Day (New York), November 25, 1893. It originally stood at the corner of Broadway and Chambers Street in Manhattan. Currently it is located at the steps of New York City Hall. The image of Nathan Hale gazed at passersby in almost the same location, where on September 22, 1776, he was hanged by Loyalist partisans during the American Revolution. Standing eight feet tall, the sculpture was created by Frederick William MacMonnies, a pupil of August St. Gaudens. It cost approximately $15,000 when completed and mounted.

== Sculpture details ==
The statue was cast in Paris, France and came to the United States a fortnight before its originally planned unveiling date of June 8, 1893. It stood on exhibition in St. Gaudens' studio, 148 West 36th Street, where a pedestal for it was prepared by architect Stanford White. It was placed facing the junction of Broadway and Chambers Street, after the drum-shaped granite pedestal, also eight feet tall, was attached as its stand. The 1776 execution site was as far Uptown, Manhattan as Harlem was in 1893.

In this position, Hale appeared to be looking at his executioners and proclaiming My only regret is that I have but one life to give for my country. The patriot's arms are bound. He is attired in a coat and waistcoat, with a frilled shirt which is open. His neck is bare in preparation for the executioner's noose. Hale's feet are also bound. Six feet tall in real life, Hale's artistic rendition has hands which are held out as far as the rope cords permit. Henry Marquand called the statue the finest produced on the United States side of the Atlantic Ocean.

== Other versions ==
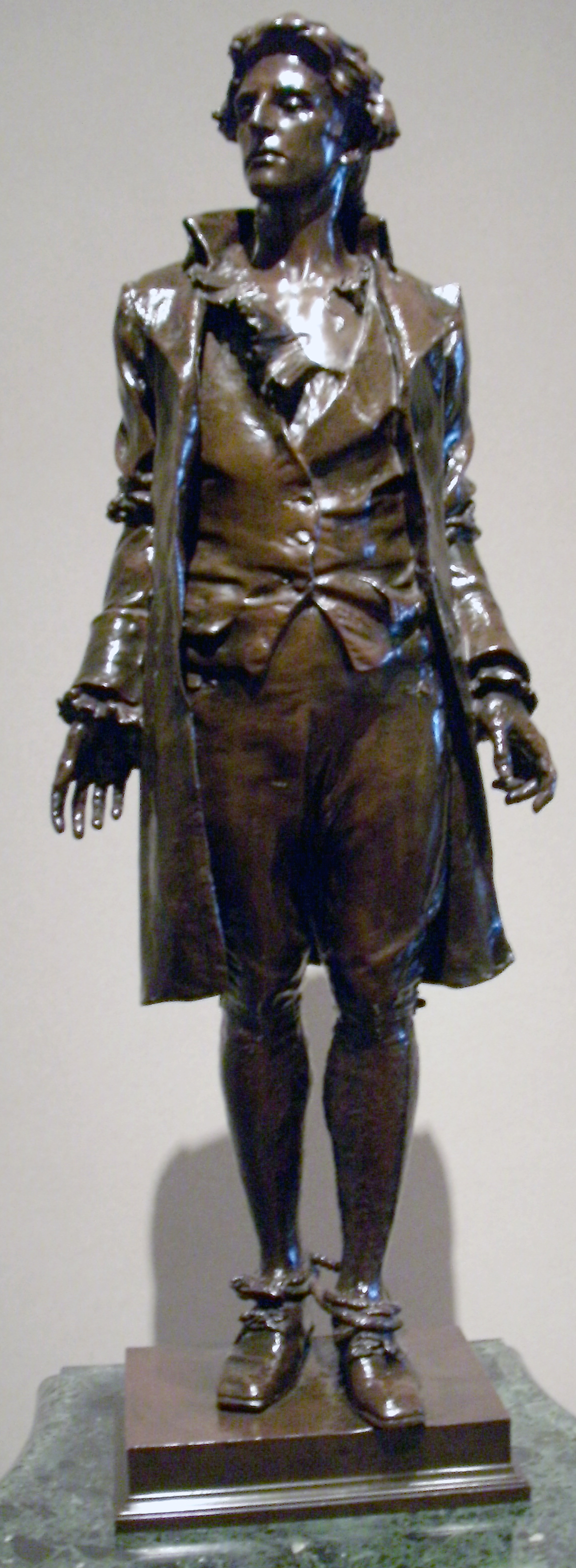
Tabletop-sized copy of Nathan Hale, in the National Gallery of Art

The Metropolitan Museum has a copy of the statue, as do the Art Museum at Princeton University, the National Gallery of Art, the Art Institute of Chicago, the White House, the Mead Art Museum at Amherst College, the Worcester Art Museum, and the Forest Lawn Museum in Glendale, CA.

== In popular culture ==
- The statue was shown at the end of the 1916 historical drama silent film The Heart of a Hero.

== See also ==
- Statue of Nathan Hale (Chicago)
- Statue of Nathan Hale (Washington, D.C.)
