= Frederick William MacMonnies =

American-French sculptor and painter (1863–1937)

Medal record

Art competitions

Representing the United States

Olympic Games
| Silver medal – second place | 1932 Los Angeles | Medals and reliefs |

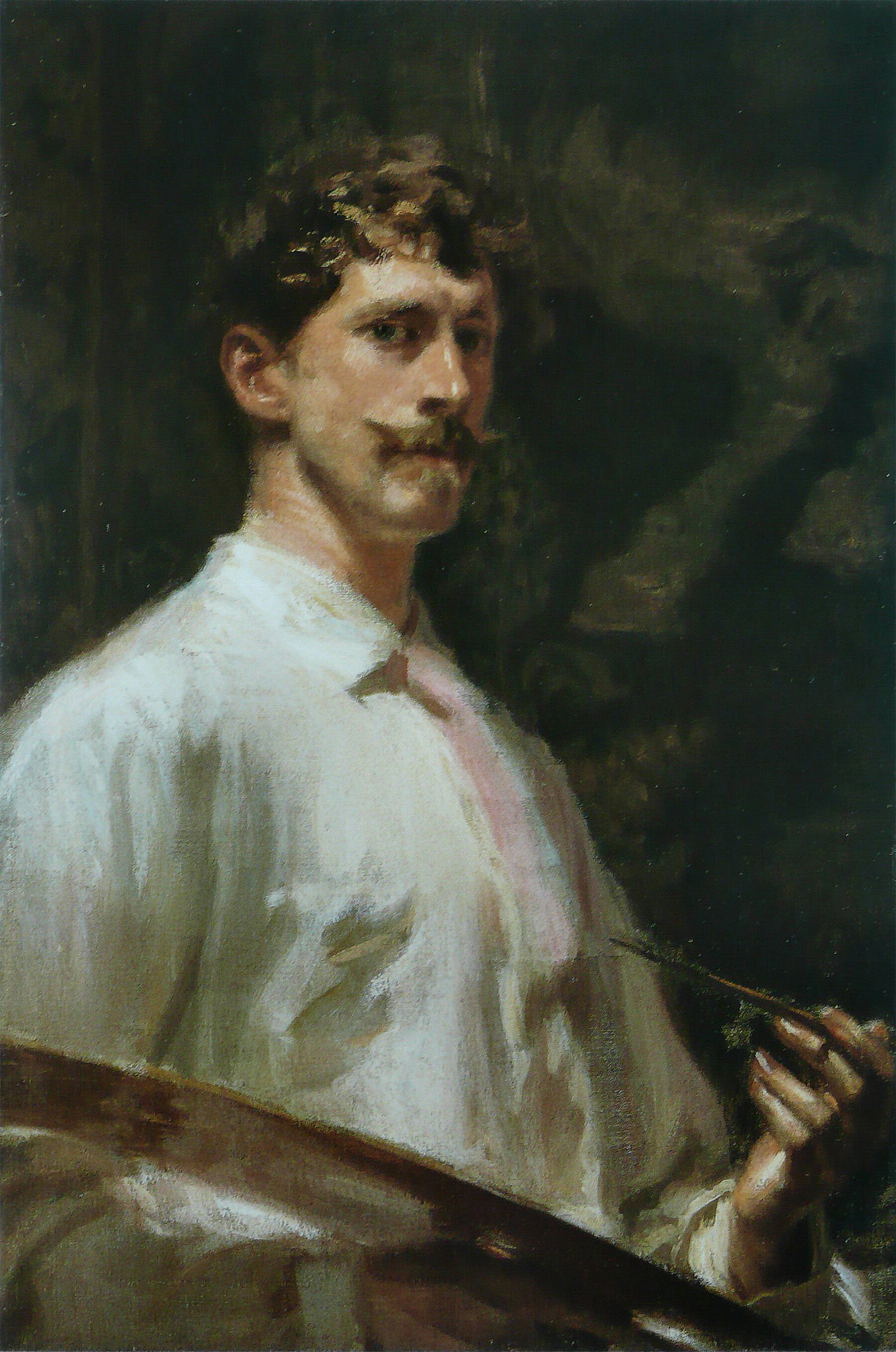
Self-portrait, 1896, Terra Foundation for American Art

Frederick William MacMonnies (September 28, 1863 – March 22, 1937) was the best known expatriate American sculptor of the Beaux-Arts school, as successful and lauded in France as he was in the United States. He was also a highly accomplished painter and portraitist. He was born in Brooklyn Heights, Brooklyn, New York and died in New York City.

Three of MacMonnies's best-known sculptures are Nathan Hale, Bacchante and Infant Faun, and Diana.

== Apprenticeship and education ==
In 1880 MacMonnies began an apprenticeship under Augustus Saint-Gaudens, and was soon promoted to studio assistant, beginning his lifelong friendship with the acclaimed sculptor. MacMonnies studied at night with the National Academy of Design and The Art Students League of New York. In Saint-Gaudens' studio, he met Stanford White, who was turning to Saint-Gaudens for the prominent sculptures required for his architecture.

In 1884 MacMonnies traveled to Paris to study sculpture at the École des Beaux-Arts, twice winning the highest award given to foreign students. In 1888 he opened a studio in Paris and began to create some of his most famous sculptures, which he submitted annually to the Paris Salon. In his atelier, he mentored such notable artists as Janet Scudder and Mary Foote. He was taught at the Académie Vitti in 1904.

== Nathan Hale ==
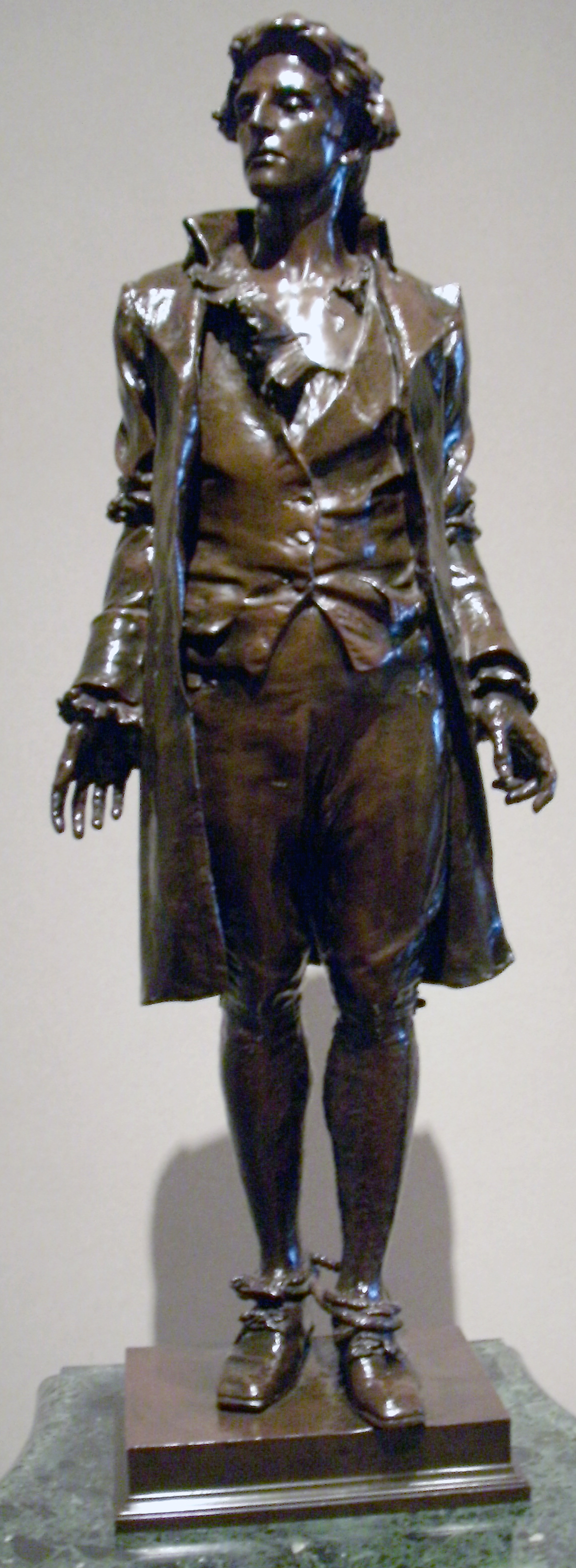
Tabletop-sized copy of Nathan Hale, in the National Gallery of Art

The 8' tall Nathan Hale statue was the first major commission gained by MacMonnies. Erected in 1893 in New York City, it now stands near where the actual Nathan Hale was thought to have been executed by hanging. Copies are scattered in museums across the United States, since MacMonnies was one of the earliest American sculptors to supplement his fees from major commissions by selling reduced-size reproductions to the public. The Metropolitan Museum has a copy, as do the Art Museum at Princeton University, the National Gallery of Art, Phoenix Art Museum, Orlando Museum of Art, and the Mead Art Museum at Amherst College.

== Major commissions ==
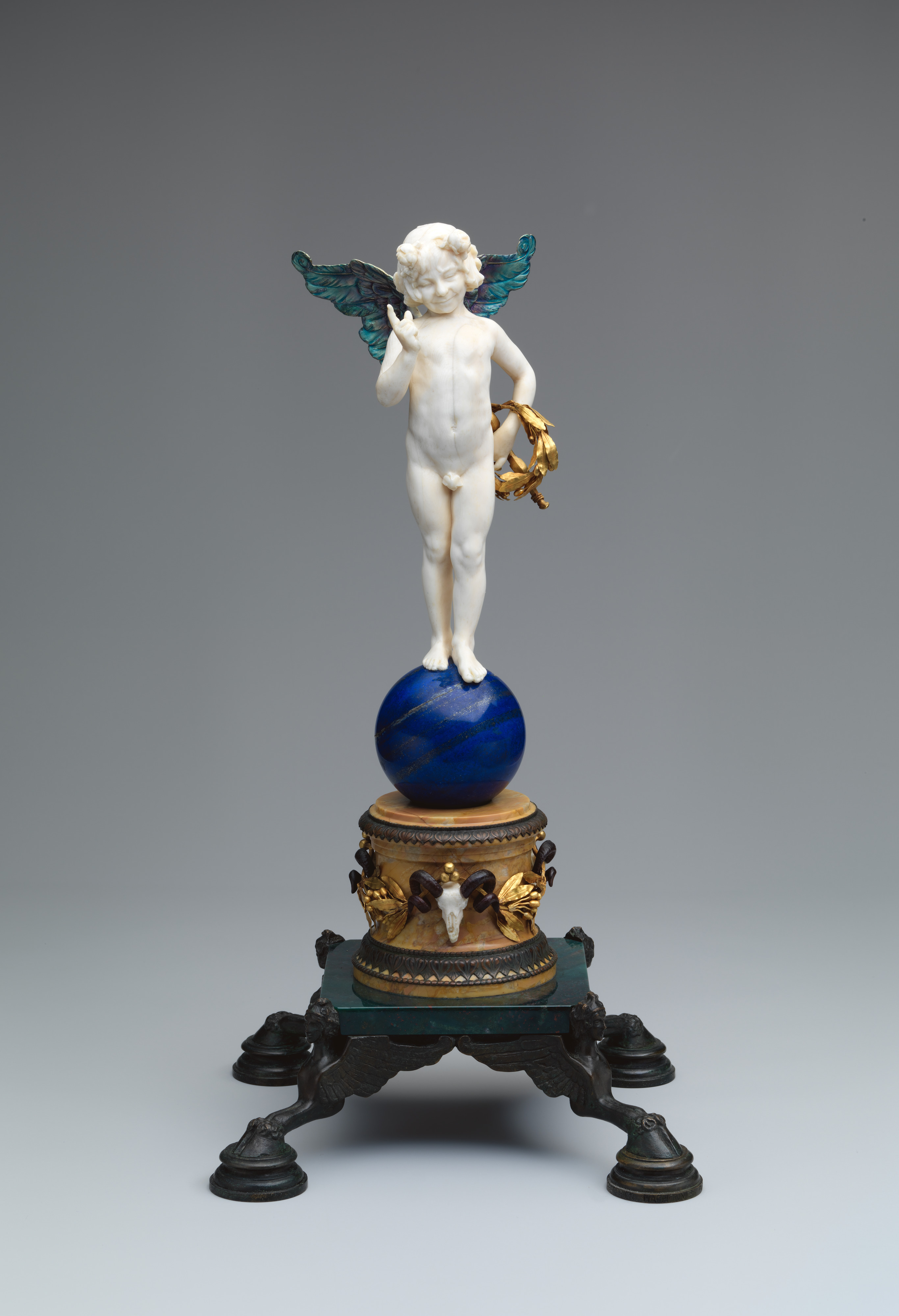
Cupid by MacMonnies at the Metropolitan Museum of Art, 1898

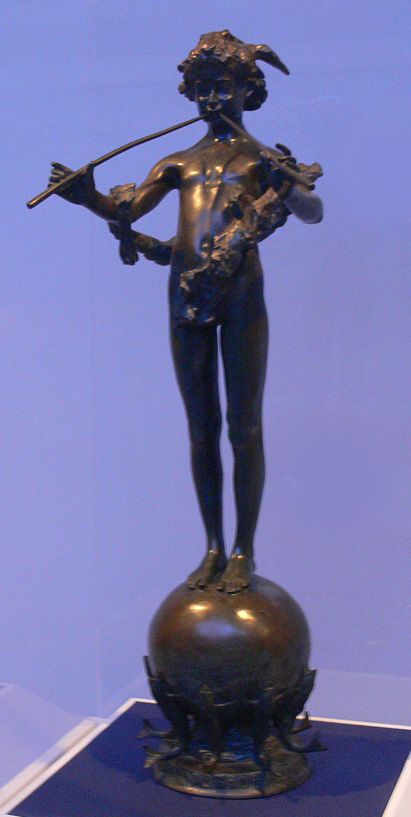
Reduced versions of his Pan of Rohallion became part of MacMonnies's stock in trade

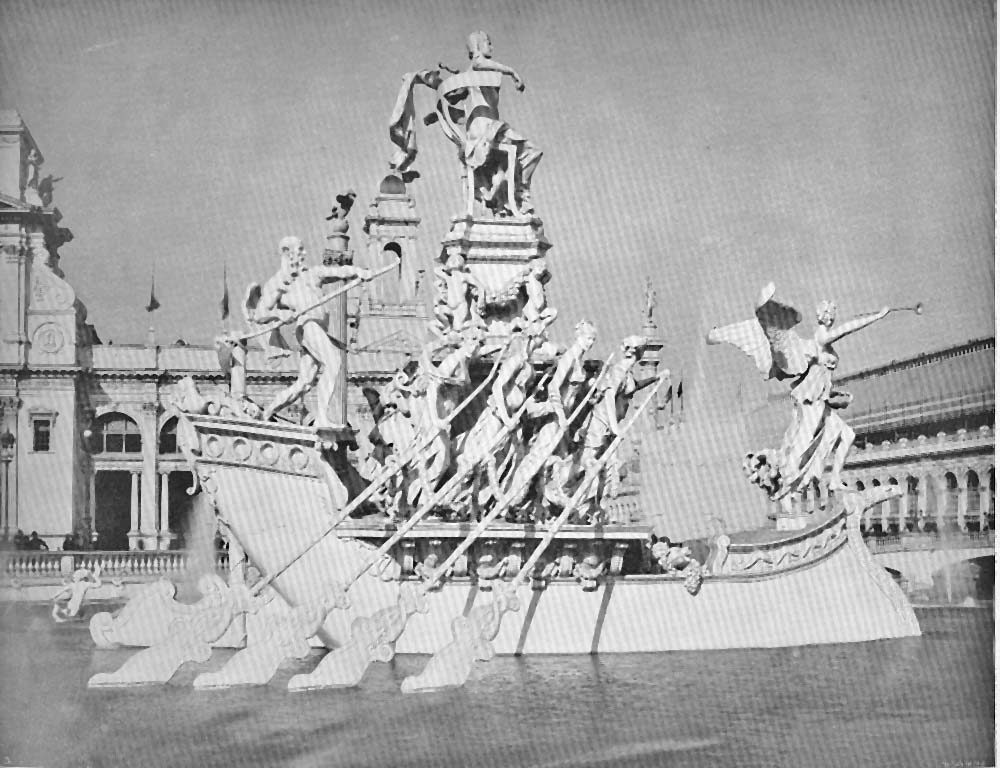
Columbian Fountain, 1893

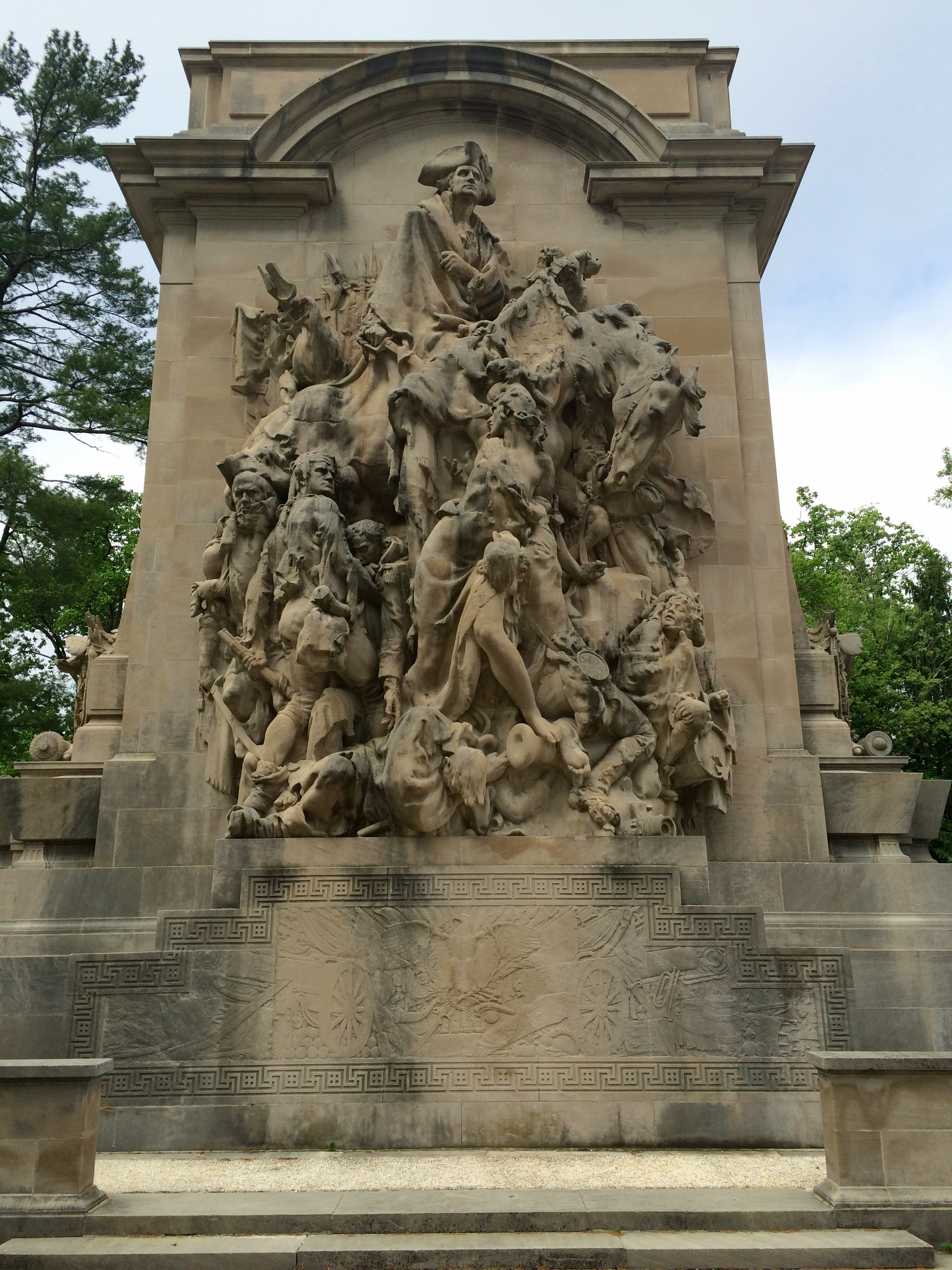
Princeton Battle Monument

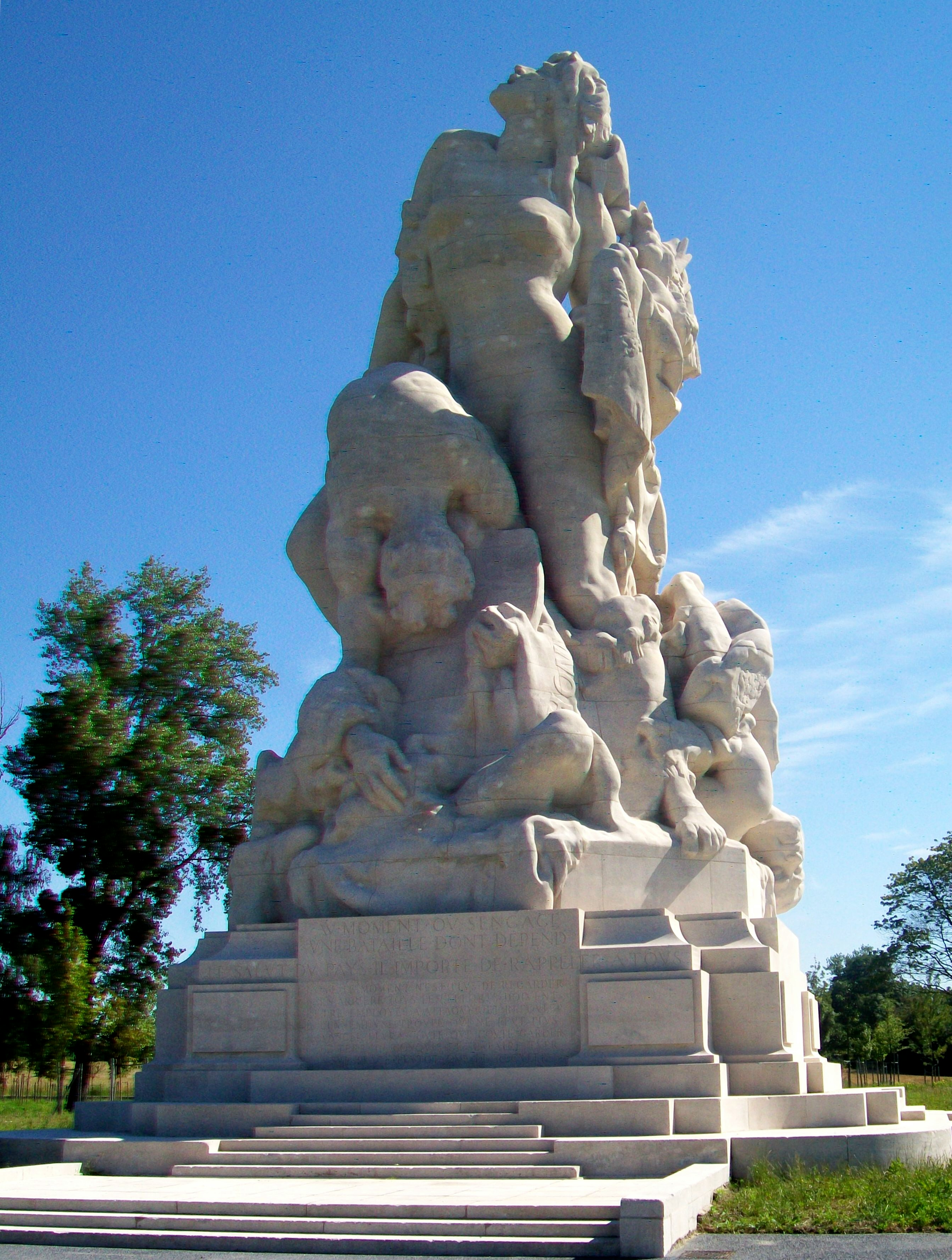
The Tearful Liberty, American Monument in Meaux, France

In 1888, the intervention of Stanford White gained MacMonnies two major commissions for garden sculpture for influential Americans, a decorative Pan fountain sculpture for Rohallion, the New Jersey mansion of banker Edward Adams, who opened for him a social circle of art-appreciating New Yorkers, and a work for ambassador Joseph H. Choate, at Naumkeag, in Stockbridge, Massachusetts.

In 1889 an Honorable Mention at the Paris Salon for his Diana led to further and more public American commissions, including spandrel reliefs for Stanford White's permanent Washington Arch, New York, and the Nathan Hale memorial in City Hall Park, dedicated in 1893. Until the outbreak of World War I, when he gave up his grand household establishment in Paris, MacMonnies travelled annually to the United States to see dealers and patrons, returning to Paris to work on his commissions. His long-term residence was at Giverny.

In 1891, he designed the statue of James S. T. Stranahan in Brooklyn. That same year, he was awarded the commission for the Columbian Fountain, the centerpiece of the 1893 World's Columbian Exposition in Chicago: the sculpture of Columbia in her Grand Barge of State, in the vast central fountain of the Court of Honor, was truly the iconic figure at the heart of the American Beaux-Arts movement. This large decorative fountain piece became the focal point at the Exposition and established MacMonnies as one of the important sculptors of the time.

In 1894, Stanford White brought another prestigious and highly visible commission, for three bronze groups for the Soldiers and Sailors Memorial Arch in Brooklyn's Grand Army Plaza. The complicated figural groups occupied him for the next eight years.(Bogart, p. 35)

Around the turn of the century, MacMonnies was commissioned to design the equestrian statue of Henry Warner Slocum in Brooklyn, which was dedicated in 1905.

Due to fame gathered from the 1893 World's Columbian Exposition, he was commissioned to produce a large public sculpture celebrating the pioneers of the American Old West, his only work on this subject. MacMonnies began the work in 1906, and the work was unveiled in 1911. The monument features a depiction of Kit Carson, and it marks the end of the Smoky Hill Trail, a popular route to Colorado Territory taken by gold-seekers, located near the Smoky Hill River. Meanwhile he was still creating portraits and his 1904 full length painting of his student Mabel Conkling was said to be his "finest .. yet".

Commissioned in 1908, his Princeton Battle Monument, created in collaboration with architects Carrere & Hastings, located in Princeton, New Jersey was not completed until 1922.(Clark 1984)

== Mid-career ==
Returning to New York after 1915, he continued his stylish work with the colossal group, Civic Virtue, a fountain for New York City Hall (1909–22). It was the subject of considerable controversy because it depicts a man trampling several female figures, representing evil sirens. This resulted in considerable public criticism. The statue was moved in 1941 to distant Queens Borough Hall and subsequently in December 2013 to Green-Wood Cemetery in Brooklyn.

=== The American Monument ===
In late 1917, MacMonnies was commissioned by a group of influential citizens of New York City, to work on a sculpture in honor of those who died in the First Battle of the Marne, as a gift to the French people in exchange for the Statue of Liberty. Called, in French, La Liberté éplorée ("The Tearful Liberty") the statue, located in Meaux, France, is over seven stories tall, at 22 metres (72 ft). The architect was American neo-classicist Thomas Hastings. While work started on the statue in 1924, it was not finished until 1932. At the time of its dedication, it was the world's largest stone monument. In 2011, the Musée de la Grande Guerre du pays de Meaux opened next to the monument.

The World War I Memorial, in Atlantic City, New Jersey, houses a 9-foot (2.7 m) bronze version of the statue.

== Late career ==
Selected to sculpt the fourth issue of the long running Society of Medalists in 1931, MacMonnies chose to celebrate Charles Lindbergh's solo Trans-Atlantic flight of 1927. The powerful bust of Lindbergh on the obverse, combined with the reverse's dramatic allegorical depiction of a lone eagle battling across the sea, mark this issue as one of the more popular of the series.

Frederick William MacMonnies died of pneumonia in 1937, aged 73.

== Honors ==
At the Paris Salon, he was awarded the first Gold Medal ever given to an American sculptor. Elected to the rank of Chevalier in the French Légion d'honneur in 1896 MacMonnies was awarded grand prize at the Paris Exposition of 1900. This was a decade of enormous productivity and personal satisfaction. A second career as a painter got a good public start in 1901, when he received an honorable mention at the Paris Salon for the first painting he entered. He was selected for the Major General George B. McClellan statue in Washington, D.C., which was first exhibited at the Paris Salon of 1906. He was an early member of the American Academy of Arts and Letters. He also won a silver medal in the art competition at the 1932 Summer Olympics.

== Personal life ==
In 1888 MacMonnies married a fellow American artist, Mary Louise Fairchild, who was living in Paris on a three-year study scholarship. When the scholarship was completed, she and MacMonnies were married (the scholarship had stipulated that it would be voided if she married during its term), and they continued living and working in Paris, although they frequently returned to the States. They shared the spotlight at the 1893 Chicago Exposition when he was commissioned to create the majestic Columbian fountain that was the centerpiece of the fair. Mary was asked to paint a giant mural, Primitive Woman, for the rotunda of the Woman's Building. A facing work, Modern Woman, would come from painter Mary Cassatt.

As their fortunes improved, the couple bought a home in Giverny, the artists' colony established by Claude Monet. They had three children: Berthe (1895), Marjorie (1897), and Ronald (1899). But their lives increasingly diverged, as Frederick traveled to his Paris studio for large projects. He also had a long-running affair with another American artist, Alice Jones (daughter of Nevada Senator/Santa Monica, California cofounder John P. Jones) with whom he had a son. He filed for divorce in 1909 (they had three children, two of whom survived infancy), after which he married Jones (1910). In his absences, expatriate American artist Will Low, spending his summers in Giverny, had developed an interest in Mary. In 1909 Low's wife died; at nearly the same time MacMonnies filed for divorce from Mary, and Mary and Low were married in 1909. They and her two daughters (Ronald died of meningitis in 1901) moved back to the States in early 1910, while MacMonnies remained in Giverny.

MacMonnies permanently relocated to the States in 1915, impelled by the outbreak of World War I. He lived in New York City until his death in 1937. He is interred in Ferncliff Cemetery, Hartsdale, Westchester County, New York. His grave is unmarked.

== Gallery ==
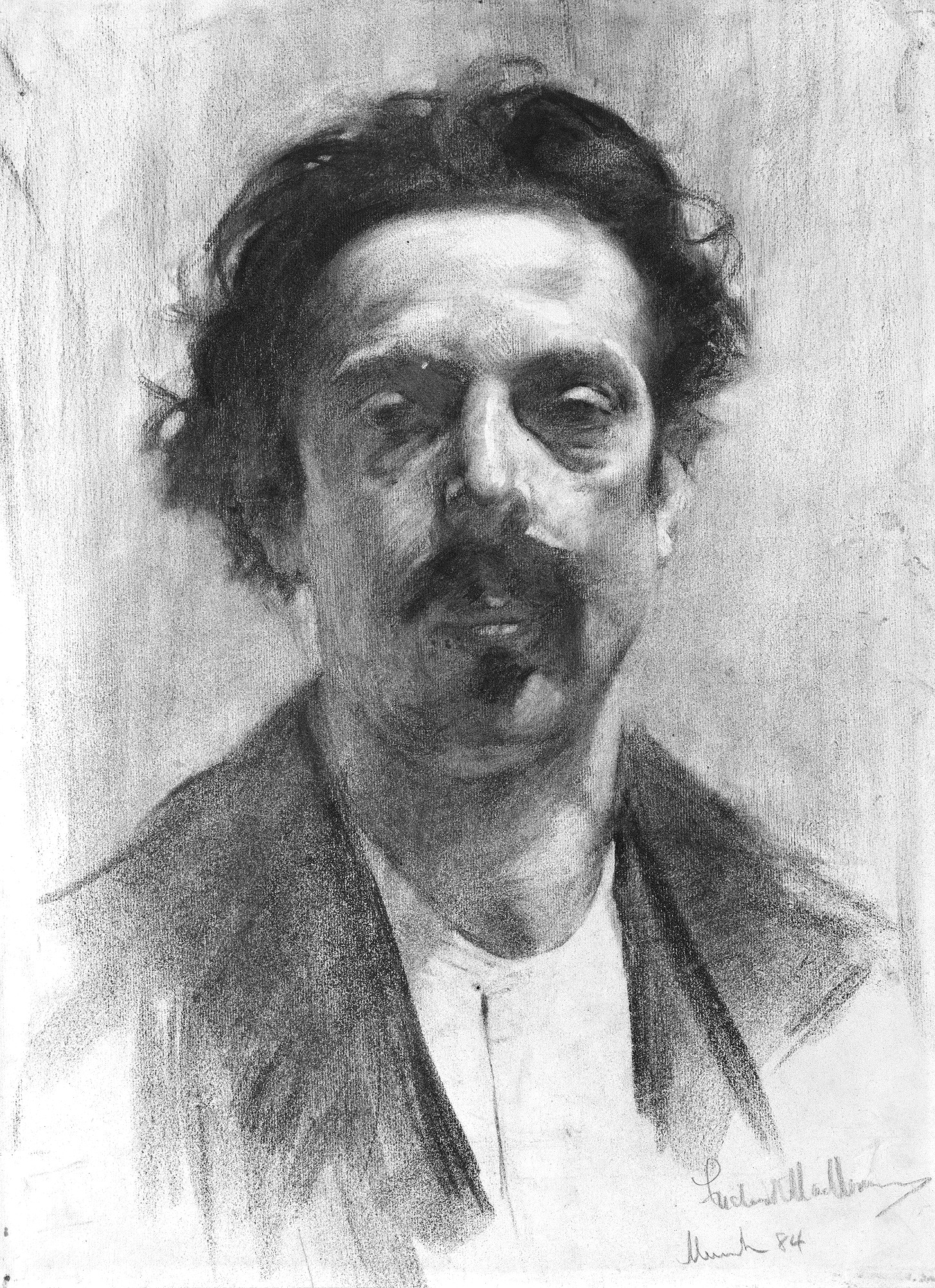
Study of Head of Man at the Metropolitan Museum of Art, 1884

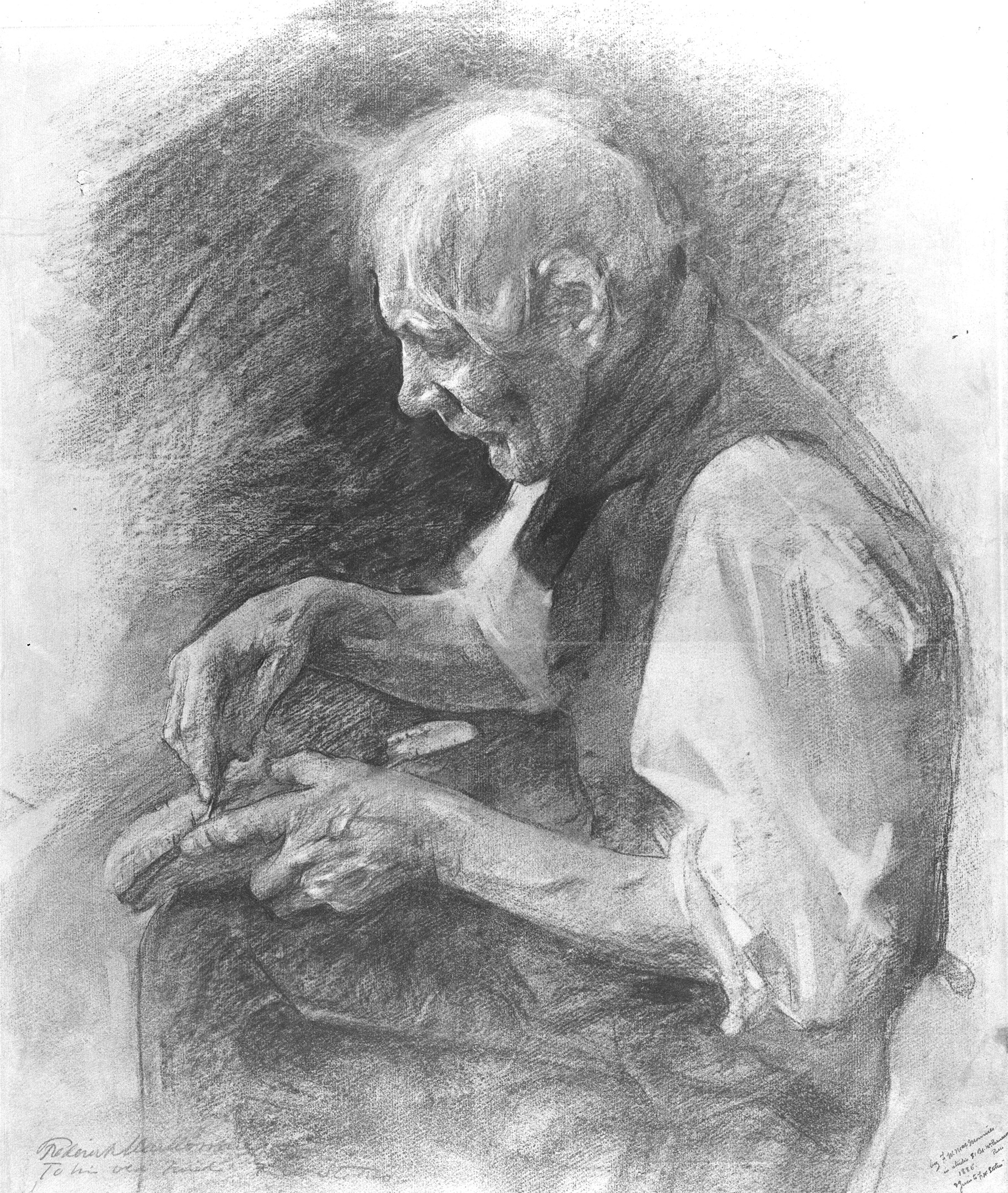
The Cobbler at the Metropolitan Museum of Art, 1885

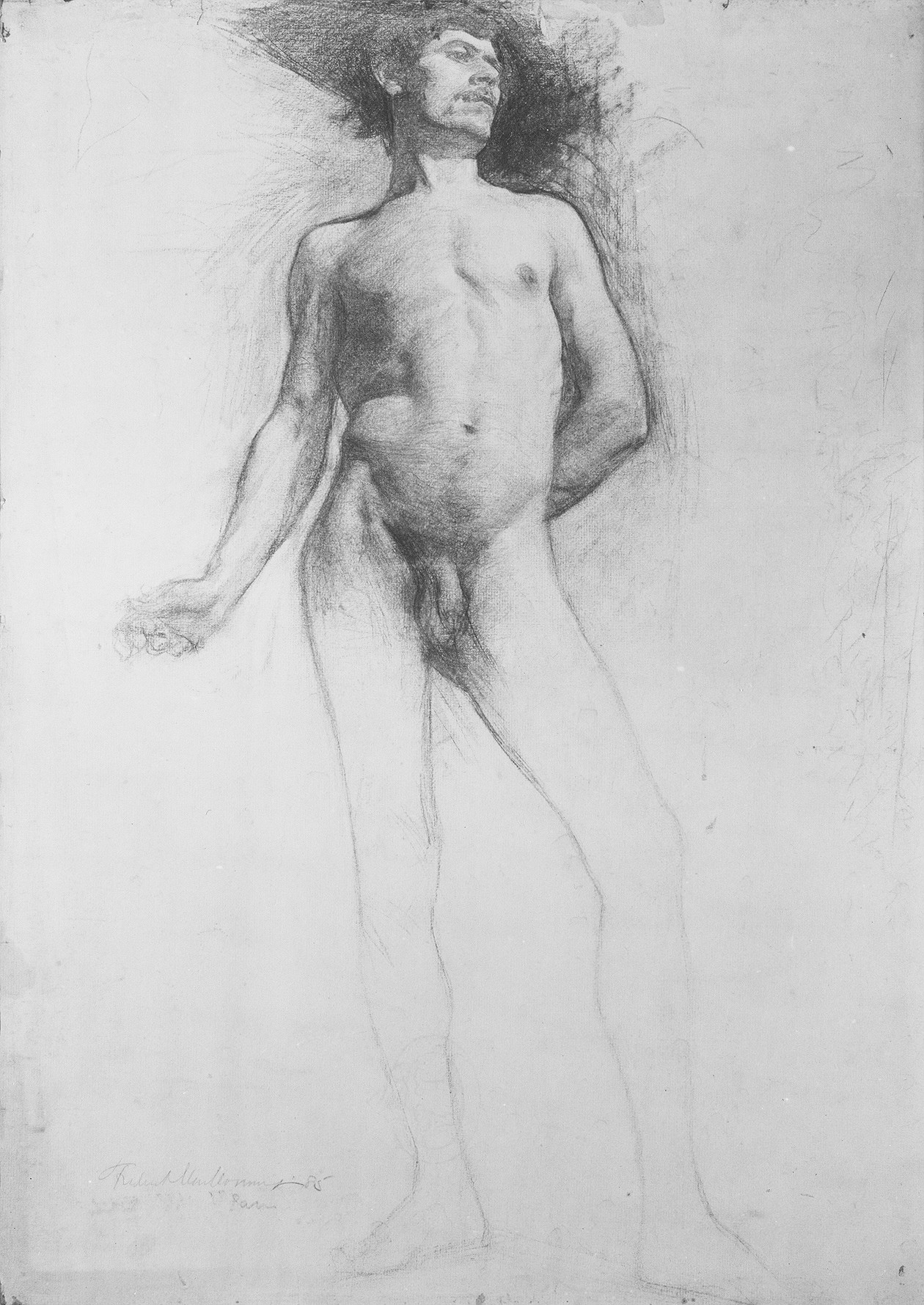
Study of a Standing Male Nude at the Metropolitan Museum of Art, 1885

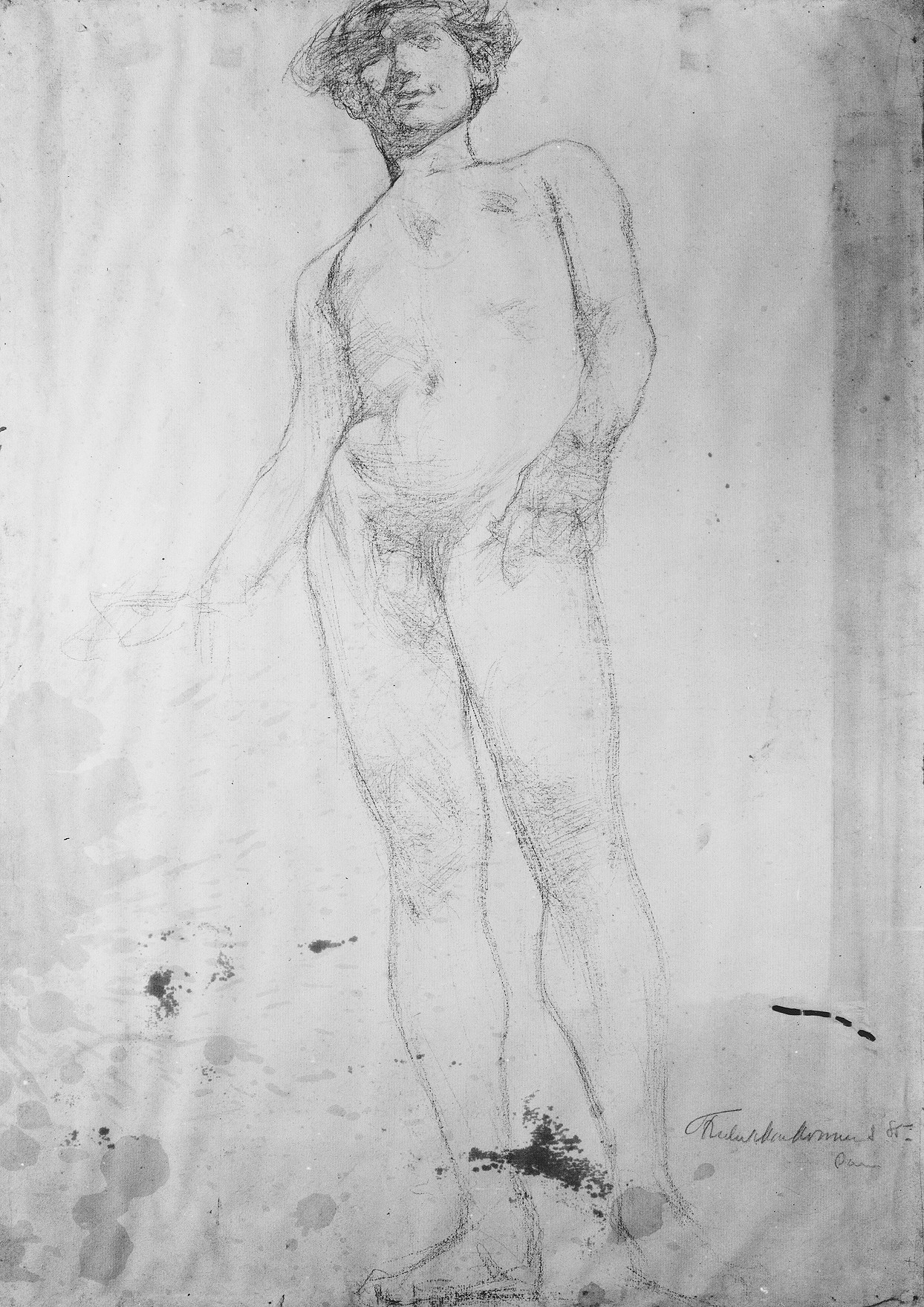
Study of a Standing Male Nude at the Metropolitan Museum of Art, 1885

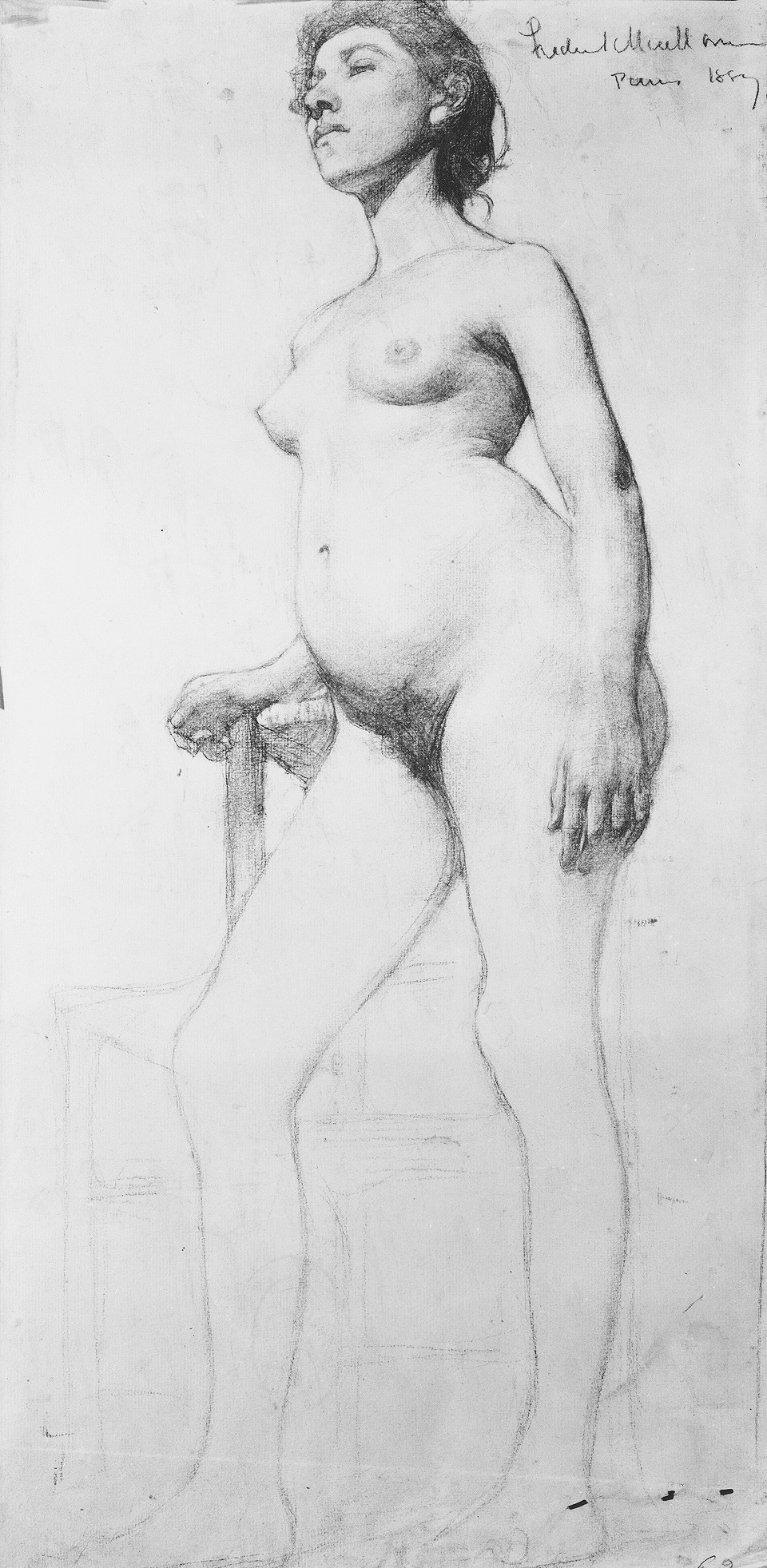
Standing Female Nude at the Metropolitan Museum of Art, 1889

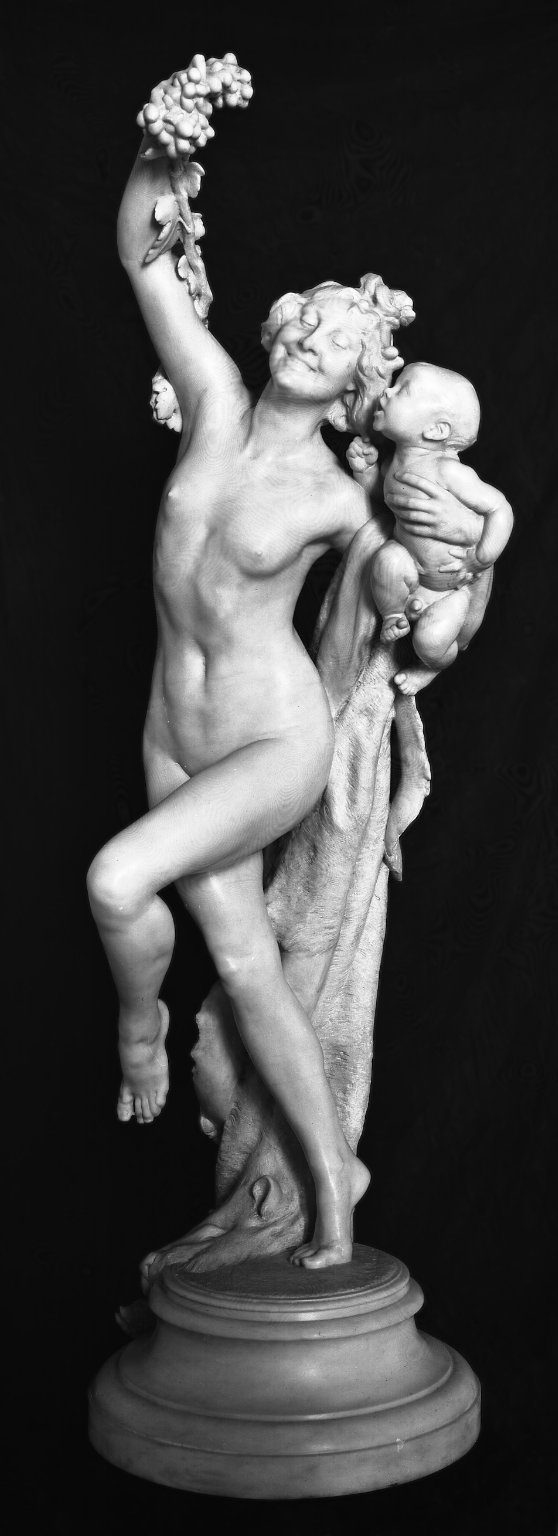
Bacchante and Infant Faun at the Brooklyn Museum, 1894

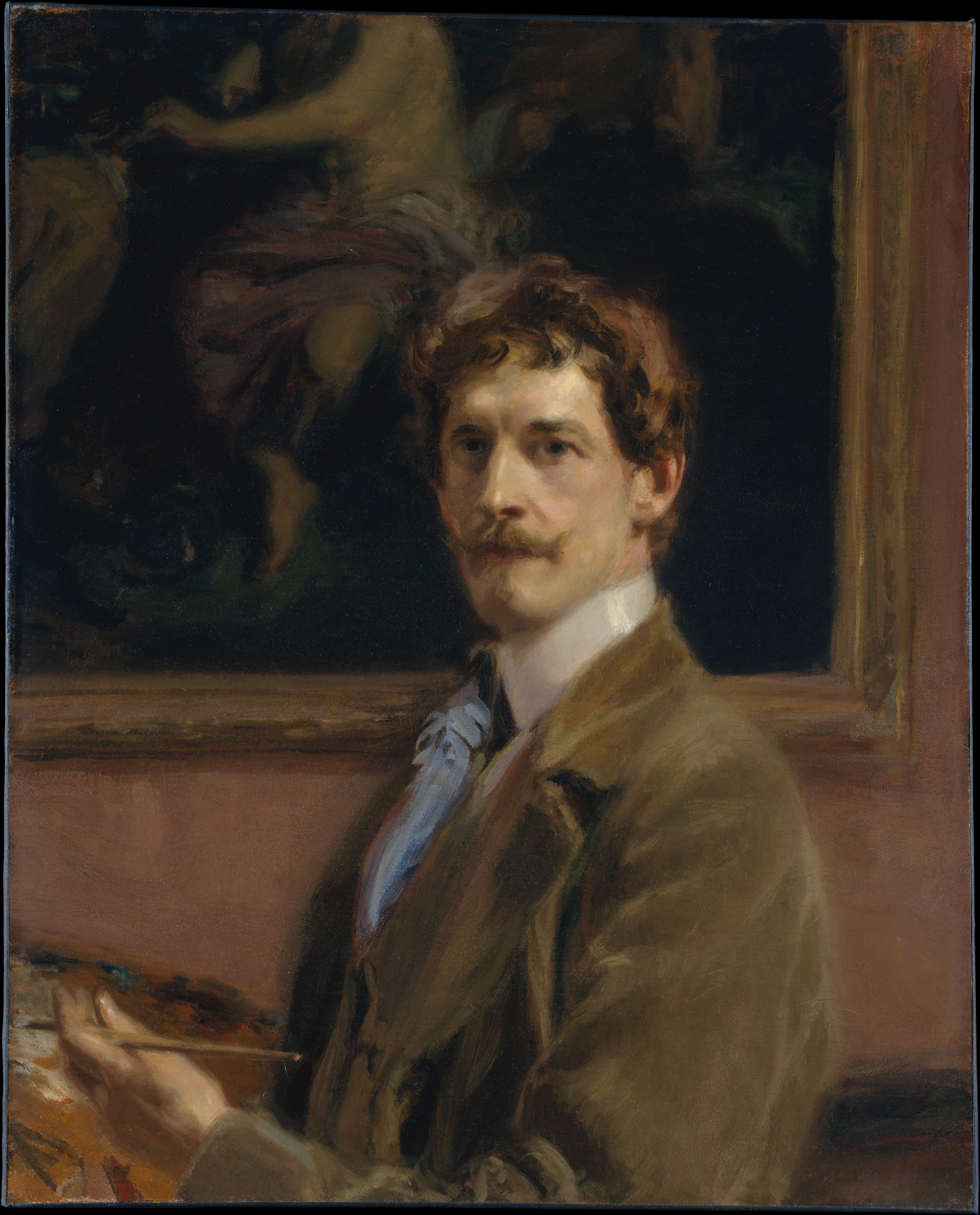
Self-portrait at the Metropolitan Museum of Art, ca. 1904

== Sources ==
- Conner, Janis and Joel Rosenkranz, Rediscoveries in American Sculpture 1989. (Contains photographs of three of MacMonnies's best works, Nathan Hale, Bacchante and Infant Faun, and Diana, along with some brief biographical information)
- Durante, Dianne, Outdoor Monuments of Manhattan: A Historical Guide (New York University Press, 2007): description of Nathan Hale at City Hall Park, Manhattan.
- Smart, Mary, A Flight With Fame: The Life & Art of Frederick MacMonnies . Biography and a catalogue raisonné; (Sound View Press, Madison, CT, 1996)
- Strother, French (December 1905). "Frederick MacMonnies, Sculptor". The World's Work: A History of Our Time. XI: 6965–6981.
- Greer, in Brush and Pencil (Chicago, 1902)
- Lorado Taft, History of American Sculpture (New York, 1903)
- Pettie, in the International Studio, volume xxix (New York, 1906)
- The Games of the Xth Olympiad Los Angeles 1932 (PDF). Xth Olympiade Committee of the Games of Los Angeles, U.S.A. 1932. 1933. pp. 748–765. Archived from the original (PDF) on April 10, 2008.
- Wagner, Juergen. "Olympic Art Competition 1932". Olympic Games Museum. Archived from the original on May 1, 2008.
- Kramer, Bernhard (May 2004). "In Search of the Lost Champions of the Olympic Art Contests" (PDF). Journal of Olympic History. 12 (2): 29–34. Archived (PDF) from the original on April 10, 2008.
- Evans, Hilary; Gjerde, Arild; Heijmans, Jeroen; Mallon, Bill; et al. "Frederick MacMonnies". Olympics at Sports-Reference.com. Sports Reference LLC. Archived from the original on March 6, 2016.
