= LGBTQ culture in Los Angeles County =

Although often characterized as apolitical, “Los Angeles has provided the setting for many important chapters in the struggle for gay and lesbian community, visibility and civil rights." Moreover, the LGBTQ community in Los Angeles has historically played a significant role in the development of the entertainment industry.

== History ==
=== Early history ===
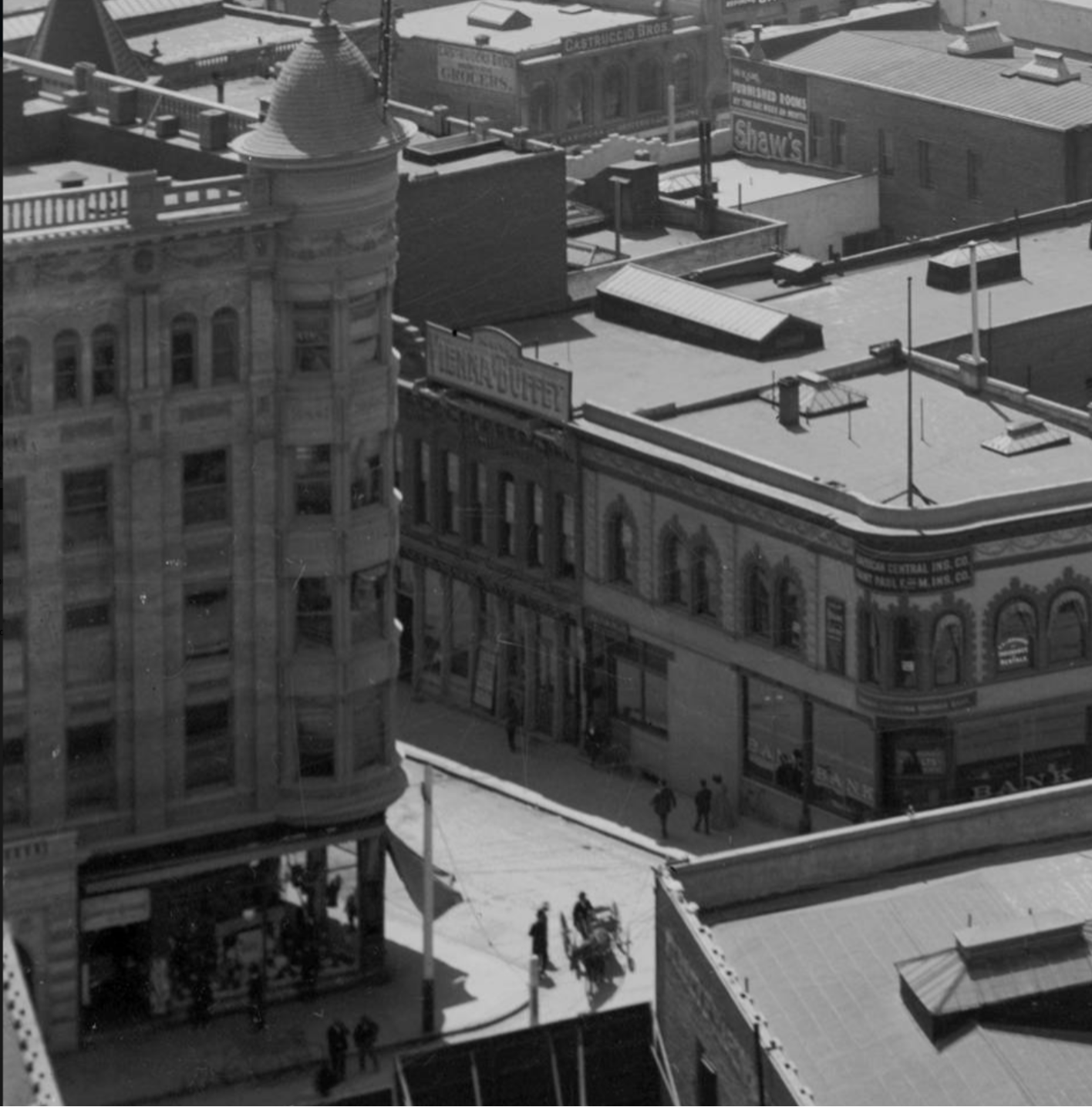
Vienna Buffet c.1900

One of the first recorded mentions of male same-sex social activity in Los Angeles was at the Vienna Buffet, a restaurant with live music in Court Street, roughly the site of the Los Angeles City Hall today. From 1891 to 1902, the venue was where gatherings of gay men (including "she boys") occurred.

Beginning in the 1920s, much of Los Angeles' LGBTQ+ culture took place in The Run, centered around Pershing Square and including much of Downtown's Historic Core. The area hosted numerous gay-friendly establishments and cruising locations, such as the Los Angeles Central Library, the Grand Avenue Bar at The Biltmore Hotel, and the Subway Terminal Building restrooms. In 1951, the park at Pershing Square was ripped out to make way for a three-level, subterranean parking garage. As a result, the dense foliage was removed, functioning as a form of deterrent for crime, including cruising. The square gradually fell into disuse and disrepair.

In 1950, Harry Hay, who sought to create "a service and welfare organization devoted to the protection and improvement of Society's Androgynous Minority", worked with Rudi Gernreich to form the Mattachine Society, an early gay rights organization, in Silver Lake. The primary goals of the society were to

1. "Unify homosexuals isolated from their own kind";
2. "Educate homosexuals and heterosexuals toward an ethical homosexual culture paralleling the cultures of the Negro, Mexican and Jewish peoples"; (Note: Joseph Stalin stated in Marxism and the National Question that a nation is "a historically-evolved, stable community of language, territory, economic life and psychological make-up manifested in a community of culture" (Stalin, quoted in Hay/Roscoe, p. 41). Hay asserted that homosexuals manifested two of the four criteria, language and a shared psychological make-up, and thus qualified as a cultural minority (Hay/Roscoe, p. 43).)
3. "Lead the more socially conscious homosexual to provide leadership to the whole mass of social variants"; and
4. "Assist gays who are victimized daily as a result of oppression".

In 1952, ONE, Inc. formed out of the Mattachine Society as the publisher of ONE Magazine. The Satyrs Motorcycle Club was founded in 1954 in Los Angeles and influenced the development of the leather subculture in the region.

=== Gay liberation era ===
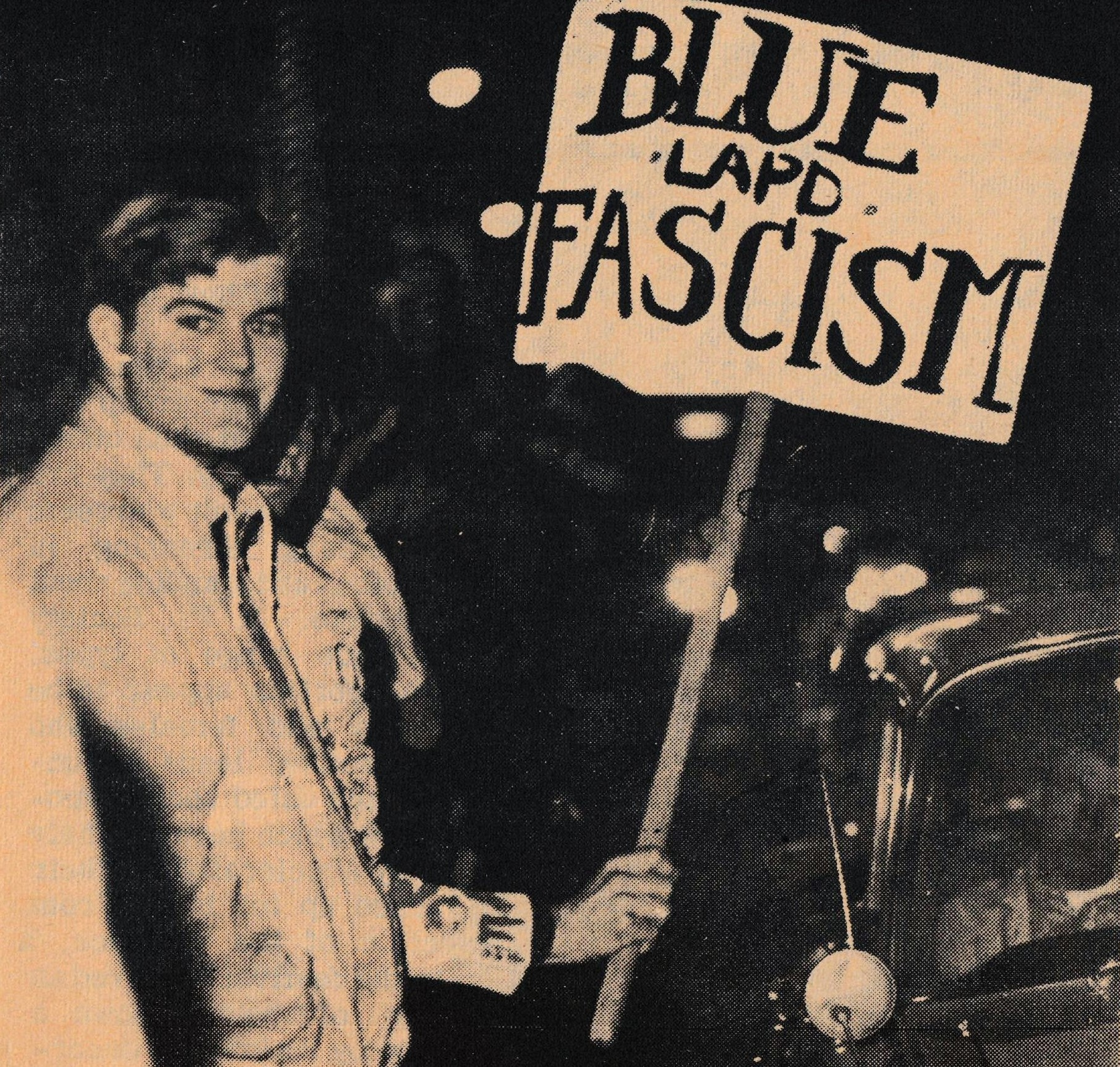
A demonstrator at the Sunset Strip curfew riot in November 1966.

By the 1960s, Los Angeles' primary "gayborhood" had shifted westward to Silver Lake. During this era, Los Angeles' queer culture was associated with the broader counterculture movement of the 1960s, and became visible and highly politicized in response to a string of violent bar raids that took place on the Sunset Strip. Increasingly harsh law enforcement tactics led the Los Angeles Police Department to seek out and aggressively monitor bars with predominately gay clienteles, including the Black Cat Tavern.

Protests reacting to these police raids, organized by P.R.I.D.E. (Personal Rights in Defense and Education) and SCCRH (Southern California Council on Religion and the Homophile), are considered to be "the first gay protests in America to attract significant numbers," preceding the Stonewall Riots by two years. The Advocate was created in 1967 in response to the riots on Sunset Strip as a tool to further ignite LGBTQ activism in Los Angeles and nationwide.

The Metropolitan Community Church (MCC) was founded in 1968 in Huntington Park, California.

Inspired by the 1969 Stonewall riots in New York City, Christopher Street West (CSW) formed in 1970 to host Los Angeles Pride. CSW co-founders Rev. Troy Perry, Rev. Bob Humphries, and Morris Kight originally discussed organizing a march or a demonstration, but Troy Perry allegedly stated, "No. We’re going to do a parade. This is Hollywood."

The Gay Community Services Center, led by activists including Morris Kight and Don Kilhefner, incorporated in 1971. The organization provided legal help for anti-Vietnam War protesters and screenings for sexually transmitted diseases.

Beth Chayim Chadashim was founded in 1972 as a Reform synagogue in Mid-City, Los Angeles, primarily for gay and lesbian Jews.

Alongside the growth in popularity of disco music, LGBTQ nightlife grew in the 1970s, with nightclubs such as Jewel's Catch One and Studio One.

In 1974, continuing hostility and harassment from the Los Angeles Police Department led to Los Angeles Pride being moved to an unincorporated area to the west of Hollywood.

Parents, Families and Friends of Lesbians and Gays (PFLAG)'s Los Angeles chapter formed in 1976.

During the late 1970s and 1980s, LGBTQ people of color in Los Angeles organized to address discrimination and establish their own political and social networks. Organizations included Lesbians of Color, a multiracial group, Gay and Lesbian Latinos Unidos (GLLU), founded in 1981, and Lesbianas Unidas in 1983. These organizations contributed to the growth of LGBTQ activism among communities of color and the emergence of a distinct Latino LGBTQ movement in Los Angeles.

=== HIV/AIDS pandemic ===
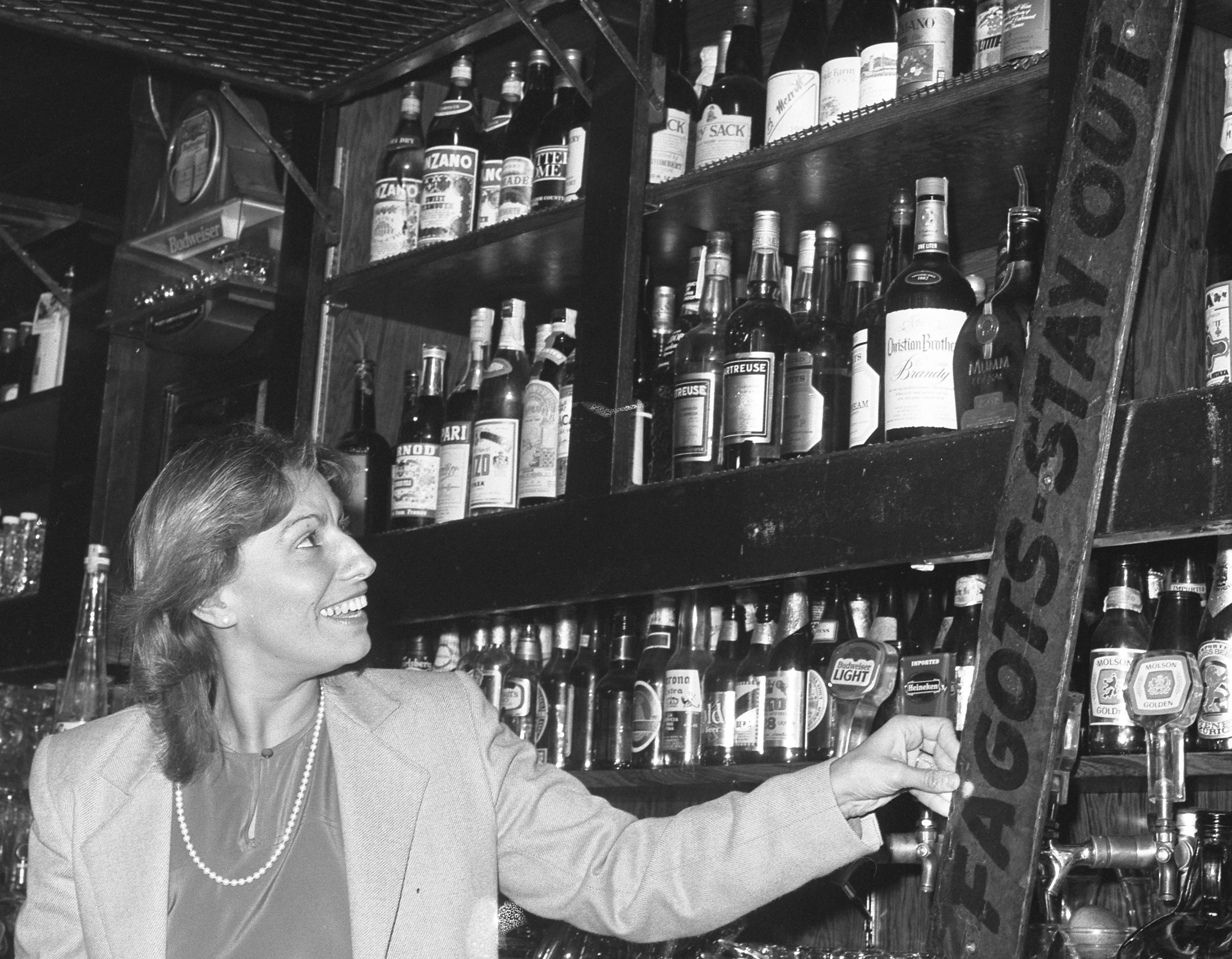
West Hollywood Mayor Valerie Terrigno removing "Fagots Stay Out" sign from Barney's Beanery (1985)

The recognition of HIV/AIDS by the Centers for Disease Control and Prevention (CDC) in 1981 led to the 1983 foundation of healthcare provider AIDS Project Los Angeles.

In 1984, a coalition of gay men, Russian Jews, and the elderly successfully held a vote to officially incorporate the City of West Hollywood. Voters elected a city council with an openly gay majority and it immediately passed a series of rent control measures to protect its longtime citizens.

The first Long Beach pride parade took place in 1984.

AIDS Project Los Angeles started the AIDS Walk walkathon in 1985 to raise funds for HIV/AIDS research and treatment.

In 1987, ACT UP Los Angeles (ACT UP/LA) was founded to advocate on behalf of HIV/AIDS patients.

=== Contemporary history ===
In 1992, the Los Angeles Unified School District established EAGLES Academy, a public high school for LGBTQ+ students.

Controversy occurred when Mitchell Grobeson, the first openly gay police officer in the Los Angeles Police Department (LAPD), resigned, accusing the agency of mistreatment. Grobeson had been reinstated into the police force and walked in the 1994 Los Angeles pride parade in full uniform, but stated that the management had attempted to terminate him by November 1995, so he resigned in January of that year. According to Grobeson, the department did not want him to actively recruit in the LGBT community.

In 1994, Sheila Kuehl became the first openly LGBTQ+ individual elected to the California State Legislature, representing the 41st State Assembly district.

Los Angeles County's LGBTQ+ Armenian-American community organized in 1998, founding the Gay and Lesbian Armenian Society.

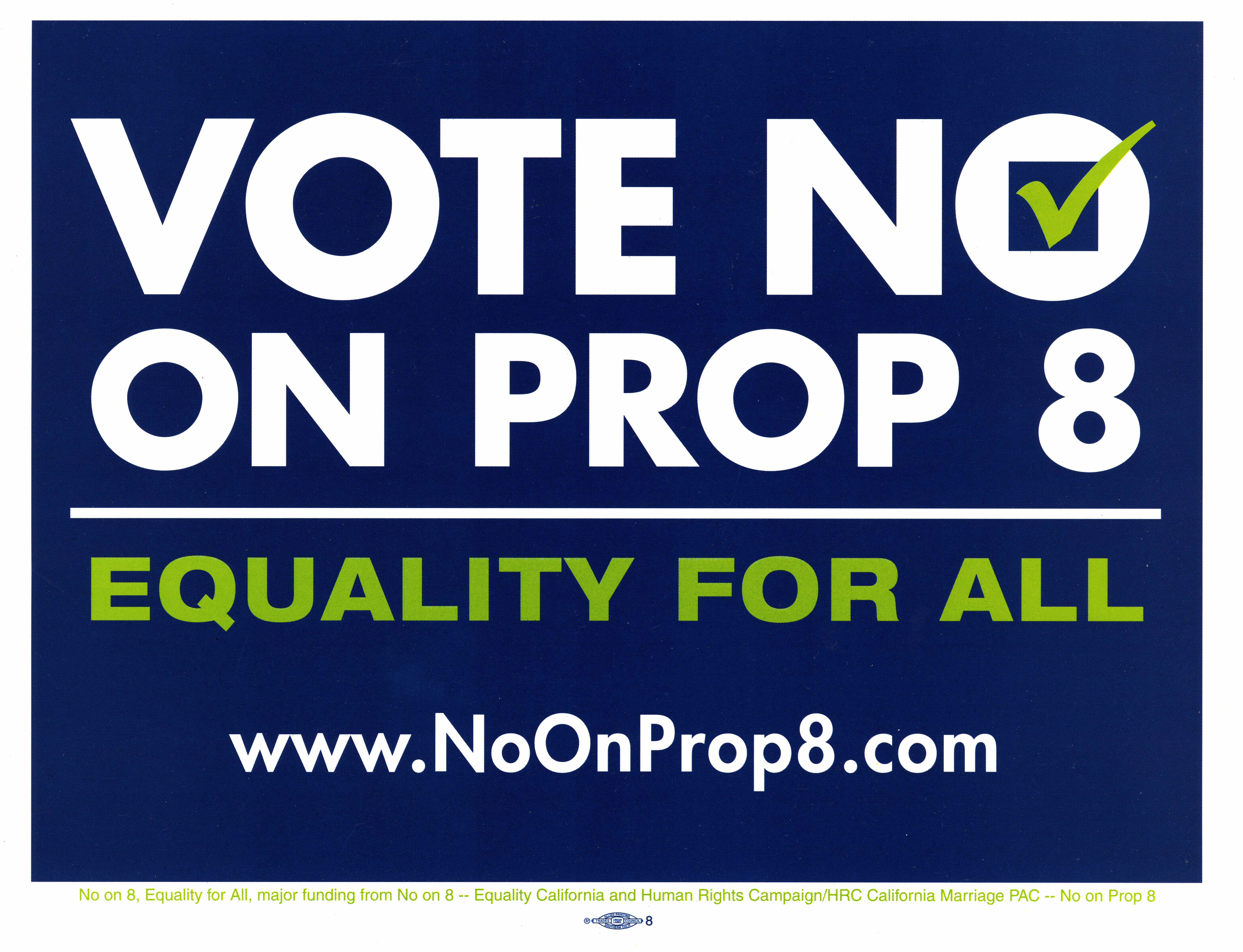
"Vote No on Prop 8 sign (2008)

There was widespread opposition to 2008 California Proposition 8 in Los Angeles County, including from Los Angeles mayor Antonio Villaraigosa; West Hollywood mayor Jeffrey Prang; local U.S Representatives Lucille Roybal-Allard, Adam Schiff, Brad Sherman, Hilda Solis and Henry Waxman; local State Senators Ron Calderon, Gil Cedillo, Sheila Kuehl, Alex Padilla, and Mark Ridley-Thomas; local State Assemblymembers Karen Bass, Kevin de León, Mike Feuer, Paul Krekorian, Ted Lieu and Anthony Portantino; the Los Angeles Unified School District Board of Education and United Teachers Los Angeles; newspapers the Daily Breeze, the Daily Bruin, The Jewish Journal of Greater Los Angeles, La Opinión, the Los Angeles Daily News, Los Angeles Downtown News, the Los Angeles Times, the Press-Telegram, the San Gabriel Valley Tribune, and the Whittier Daily News; and organizations such as ACLU of Southern California and the Los Angeles LGBT Center.

The 2010s saw a resurgence of LGBTQ+ print media in Los Angeles County, with the launch of the newspapers The Pride LA (2015) and Los Angeles Blade (2017).

In response to gentrification and the closure of several local gay bars in Silver Lake, the Off Sunset Festival was launched in 2013 to celebrate the neighborhood's rich LGBT+ history.

The San Fernando Valley's first modern pride parade was established in 2014, led by the organization Somos Familia Valle.

In 2015, Los Angeles LGBT Center partnered with Latino Equality Alliance to open Mi Centro, a culturally sensitive facility in the predominantly Latine Boyle Heights neighborhood.

Maebe A. Girl became the first drag queen elected to public office when she was elected to the Silver Lake Neighborhood Council in 2019.

glendaleOUT was established in 2019 to serve Glendale's LGBTQ+ residents.

In 2019, the Los Angeles LGBT Center opened its Anita May Rosenstein Campus, designed to provide intergenerational services such as emergency and transitional housing, affordable housing, a senior center, a youth center, and employment programs. Los Angeles Blade's Karen Ocamb called the facility "as monumental a moment in LGBT history as the Stonewall riots did for the gay liberation awakening 50 years ago." In 2020, the organization opened Center South in Leimert Park to serve the neighborhood's predominantly African-American population.

Following COVID-19-related issues in 2020 and 2021, the annual Glendale Pride in the Park, held in Adams Hill, came to fruition in June 2022. The event is a family-friendly picnic.

In 2023, a wave of anti-LGBTQ+ hate led to protests against the Glendale Unified School District and Los Angeles Unified School District.

== Demographics ==
According to the Williams Institute, as of 2024 there are about 665,000 LGBTQ people in Los Angeles County, representing about 9% of the county's population. Of this group, 39% are Latino, 37% are White, 13% are Asian, 8% are Black, and 4% identify as "Multiracial or 'Other', AIAN, or NHPI".

A 2007 study reported that 3.7% of adults in Los Angeles County identified as lesbian, gay, or bisexual. By race, the percentages were 5% of whites, 4% of African-Americans and 2.8% of Latinos.

== Geography ==
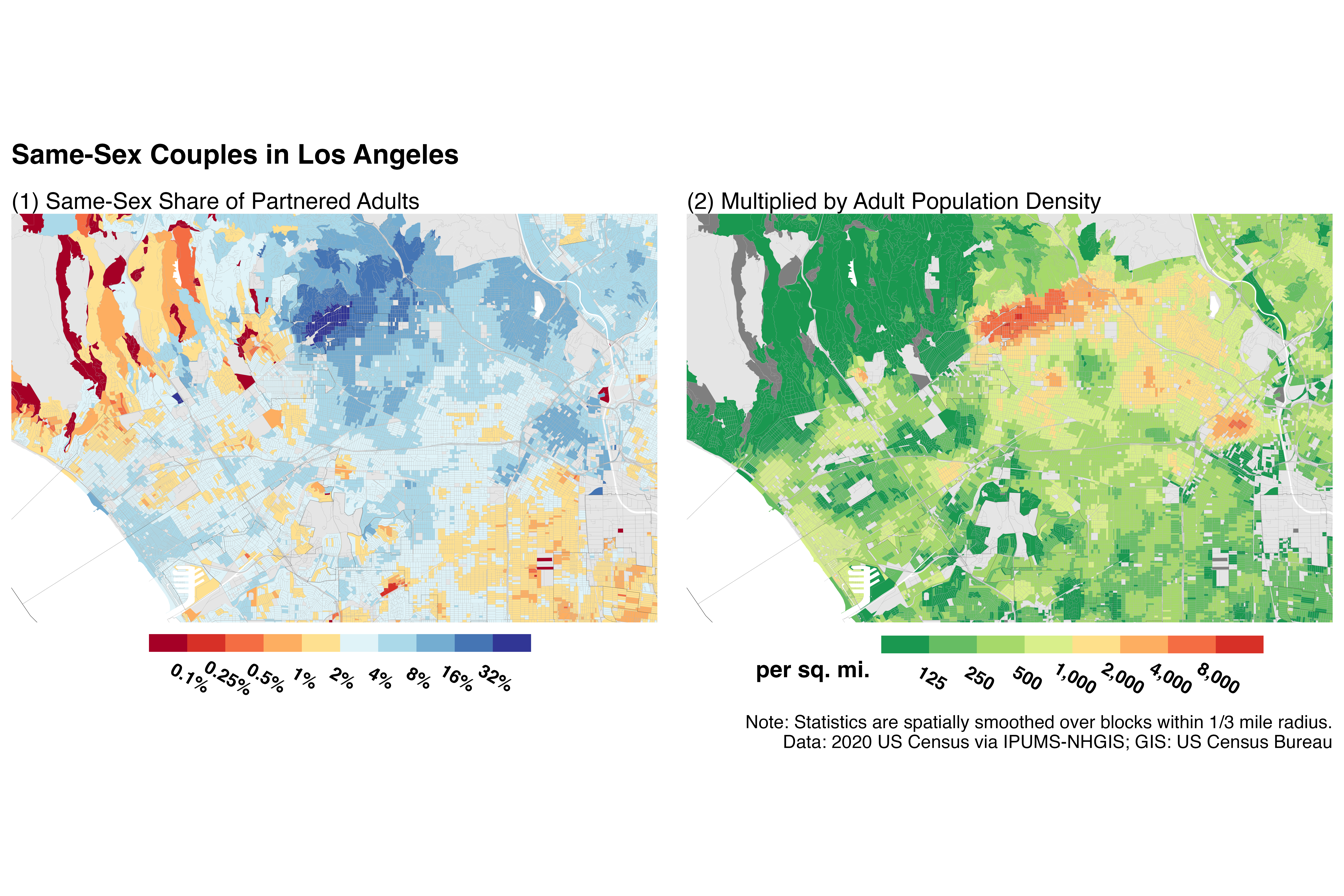
Map of same-sex couples in Los Angeles

The City of West Hollywood is the thriving core of the LGBT community and nightlife and as of 2014 its population was about 40% LGBT. It had the nicknames "Gay Camelot" and "Boys Town". LGBT businesses opened in West Hollywood because it was under the jurisdiction of the Los Angeles County Sheriff's Department; the Los Angeles Police Department had a reputation of raiding LGBT businesses. In addition the presence of the design community also attracted LGBT culture. West Hollywood was affected by AIDS in the 1980s. By 2014, as LGBT individuals had faced increasing acceptance in society, the city's identity has slowly shifted from being exclusively LGBT.

Writing in 2001, Moira Kennedy said, “West Hollywood symbolizes gay and lesbian political strength.” However, “the labeling of the area as ‘the gay city’ by locals and the media carries multiple meanings, not all of them positive." As a result, LGBT folks continue to debate West Hollywood's role as the political, cultural and social center of the community.

Another LGBT community is located in Silver Lake, Los Angeles. There are large numbers of LGBT residents of Venice, Los Angeles and the City of Santa Monica. Other communities with LGBT residents include The Run, Elysian Park, Hollywood, North Hollywood, Reseda, Sherman Oaks, Studio City and Van Nuys. Areas outside of the City of Los Angeles with LGBT residents include Laguna Beach and Riverside.

== Night life ==
Bars were the “primary gay social institution in cities" after World War II. They provided places for queer folks to meet friends and find potential partners. Moreover, queer bars in LA were considered to be the most public aspect of homosexual life in the mid-20th century: the spaces themselves helped shape burgeoning individual and collective identities. However, the newfound visibility of gay bars frequently led to violent raids by the Los Angeles Police Department. In fact, “In 1969 alone the Los Angeles Police Department made 3,858 arrests under the category of crime it used to persecute homosexuals."

Moreover, the police raids and subsequent protests at The Black Cat Tavern and The Patch in 1967 are often credited with igniting the mainstream LGBT Movement (prior to the protests at Stonewall). In honor of the Los Angeles LGBT community, The Black Cat Tavern was deemed a “Historical-Cultural” monument by the Los Angeles City Planning Department in 2008.

Other noteworthy gay bars in Los Angeles include:

- Los Globos in Silver Lake
- Jewel's Catch One

Circus of Books was a bookstore and gay pornography shop in West Hollywood that was notable as a gay cruising spot of the late 20th century.

== Politics ==
LGBT citizens became an identified voting bloc in city politics from the 1980s. In 1993 5% of the Los Angeles voters identified as gay or lesbian.

During the mayoral elections, Tom Bradley was elected due to support from a left-leaning coalition that included LGBT groups. The 1992 Los Angeles Riots caused the coalition to disintegrate. In 1993, Michael Woo, who was a member of the Los Angeles City Council, was the preferred choice since Bradley did not seek re-election as Mayor of Los Angeles. Woo got 40% of the votes from those who identified as gay or lesbian, compared to a third candidate who received 27% and Richard Riordan, who received 11%. In the runoff election, Woo received 72% of the votes from those who identified as gay and lesbian. In 1997, Tom Hayden, a member of the Senate of California, received 54% of the gay and lesbian vote while Riordan received 41%. The lesbian and gay voters and the African-American blocs were the only ones to vote over 50% in favor of Hayden and Hayden had made strong efforts to attract gay and lesbian votes.

== Institutions ==
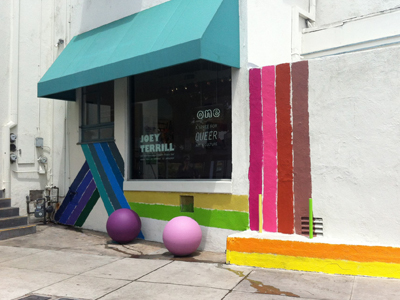
ONE National Gay & Lesbian Archives museum in West Hollywood

The Los Angeles LGBT Center is in the community.

Ethnic LGBT+ organizations based in Los Angeles include the GALAS LGBTQ+ Armenian Society, RAHA International and Satrang.

The ONE National Gay & Lesbian Archives at the University of Southern California holds LGBT-related archival materials. It maintains an archive and museum in West Hollywood.

The Gay Women's Service Center, the first U.S. social center for lesbians, was founded in 1971.

Old Lesbians Organizing for Change (OLOC) is an organization of lesbians 60 years of age and older that works towards tackling critical issues impacting the aging LGBTQ community. Their goal is to undo ageism, sexism and racism and build community empowerment through educational programming, national conferences, socials and action. They are a national organization that started in 1987 and is still currently running.

Harry Hay established the Mattachine Society in Los Angeles in 1950; the organization moved its headquarters from to San Francisco in the 1950s.

From 1992 to 2004, the EAGLES Academy was located in Hollywood. It was the first public high school designed for LGBT youth from grade 7 onwards in the United States.

Jaja Muhammad of the BBC described the bookshop Circus of Books, with locations in West Hollywood and Silverlake as the most famous Los Angeles book retailer focusing on LGBT-centric pornography in the pre-internet era. It was called Book Circus until a renaming by new owners in 1982. In 2016 and 2019 the latter and former locations closed, respectively. Muhammad stated "it was a refuge and a meeting place for LA's gay community".

The UCLA Center for LGBTQ+ Advocacy, Research & Health, at the UCLA Fielding School of Public Health, was founded in 2020.

Connexxus Women's Center/Centro de Mujeres was one of the first lesbian and women centered non-profit organizations that focused on supporting the holistic wellness and professionalization of the lesbian community. They first opened their doors in January 1985 and closed in June 1990. Connexxus was successful in creating opportunities for women's’ professional development through their economic empowerment program. They provided a variety of mental health services such as 1-on-1 counseling and support groups and community wide conferences for service providers. Another strong component of the organization was their community events to facilitate socializing and community building.

ACT UP/LA was founded December 1987 and disbanded ten years later in 1997. ACT UP/LA was a powerful activist force in Los Angeles during the AIDS pandemic. They advocated for accessible healthcare the HIV+ community, to destigmatize stereotypes towards them, and to provide information and education about existing services. ACT UP/LA was unique because it also had a Woman's Caucus that had strong male allies. The caucus centered on the needs of women affected by HIV and AIDS and coordinated their own actions and education.

Southern California Women for Understanding (SCWU) was one of the first lesbian non-profit educational organizations in Los Angeles, California. SCWU was the brainchild of Betty Berzon, a former Board member of the Whitman-Radclyffe Foundation (WRF). Betty Berzon recruited local lesbian activists to be on the board: Myra Riddell (Chairperson), Terry DeCresenzo (Vice-Chairperson), Sue Philbrick (Secretary), Karen Weiss (Treasurer), Betty Berzon (Ex-Officio, Liaison to the Board). Pat Berlly, Gloria Muetzel, Irene Robertson, Jane Patterson and Barbara Colby comprised the remaining voting committee members. Southern California Women, a chapter WFR, began in 1976, as a social group for gay women that hosted general membership meetings, special interest discussion groups and social gatherings. During an administrative upheaval of WRF in 1978, Southern California Women divorced from WRF and became the Southern California Women for Understanding. Throughout their time different chapters popped up beyond the Los Angeles area, such as San Gabriel and Orange County in California.

The goal of SCWU was twofold. First, they wanted to disseminate accurate information about lesbians and lesbian culture to disrupt stereotypes and myths media perpetuated about lesbians. They believed that tackling these misconceptions would decrease and ultimately stop the hostility and discrimination against gay and lesbians in different facets of their life. Second, they sought to meet the needs of career women who had to remain closeted. They hosted a variety of anonymous socials and events hosted in the private residence of members who offered their space to sustain anonymity of these women.

Other work of SCWU consisted of supporting local and statewide politicians and media outlets whose political alignments supported the lesbian and gay community. They often joined local actions coordinated by gay organizations in Los Angeles and statewide. Most of this type of work was undertaken by out lesbians, or those who were able to navigate outness and anonymity in their life.

The social that SCWU hosted varied from educational workshops, skill building activities and dances, to name a few. Some of their most popular events were the Speakers Bureau Panelist with local lesbian, “Canines, Lovers, & Felines too” workshop, Oldies but Goodies Night and Disco Dance, Outreach at the Beach and camping weekends.

Lesbian Nurses of Los Angeles (LNLA) was formed in July 1985. It is “a support and professional group to Registered Nurses who share in common: being a woman; being a feminist; being a lesbian.” They provide support for each other through problem solving, identity based referrals to resources and knowledge sharing. An important aspect of their meetings is consciousness-raising of political and social issues affecting lesbians, feminists and nurses. They mission and goals inspired collaborations with other community organizations that fought against homophobia and discrimination, a prime example the Southern California Women for Understanding. They would meet biweekly at the homes of their members which created a sense of community and chosen family for the women who may otherwise not have that in their personal life. A unique aspect of their work is support to nurses who are dealing with grievances in their workplace due to discrimination based on their sexual orientation but LNLA also advocates for and supports their lesbian and gay clients who are accessing healthcare.

Lesbian Visibility Week was an event from July 8 to 15, 1990 to 1992 organized by the Lesbian and Gay Advisory Council in West Hollywood. It was one of the first major events in Los Angeles that highlighted the lesbian community. Throughout the week it hosted art shows, plays, a film festival, picnics and even a dog show.

The Los Angeles Women's Community Chorus 10th Anniversary Album

The Los Angeles Women's Community Chorus (LAWCC) was a Los Angeles based non-profit group from 1976 to 1990 and performed works written and arranged by women. The LAWCC used their platform to bring awareness about lesbian issues, feminism and other local issues affecting the gay and lesbian community. The chorus had a steady and consistent group of around 80 women on any given year. These women committed for at least a year and spent numerous hours practicing to develop a professional and talented rapport in Los Angeles and beyond. The LAWCC was asked to perform in a variety of venues such as universities, prisons, conventions and local union and organizing meetings. An important aspect of their work was being intentional about the community accessing their performances. Their events tended to be sliding scale or donation based, provided childcare, offered Spanish translations and signing for the hearing impaired and offering braille song books for the blind.

The Gay and Lesbian Community Service Center (GLCSC), currently known as the Los Angeles LGBT Center, was established in 1972 by the Los Angeles Gay Liberation Front and the Metropolitan Community Church. Much like today, the GLCSC focused on providing human services for the local gay and lesbian community, especially housing services due to the dire housing crisis at the time. One important program they ran was the Gay and Lesbian Youth Talk Line, an anonymous service for youth to connect with the community and local resources. Other services were the Community Outreach and Education project, RAPS, quarterly newsletters, workshops, social outings, safer sex projects, the Women's Law Project and the HIV Law Project.

== Media ==
=== Print ===
Local newspapers include Los Angeles Blade and The Pride LA.

Local magazines include the English-Spanish bilingual Adelante Magazine and English-only The Fight Magazine.

== Notable residents ==
- Jewel Thais-Williams (1939-2025) activist and business owner
- Jinx Beers (1933–2018), activist and scholar
- Rose Greene (1946–2019), financial planner and activist
- Lorri Jean, former executive director of LGBT Center
- Ray Navarro (1964–1990), artist, filmmaker and HIV/AIDS activist
- Torie Osborn, activist and political figure
- Ben J. Pierce (1999–), YouTuber, singer-songwriter and actor
- Virginia Uribe (1933–2019), educator and activist
- Carl Bean (1944-2021), activist, singer and religious leader

== See also ==
- At The Beach LA
- Gay Men's Chorus of Los Angeles
- Dirty Looks (non-profit)
- Latina lesbian organizations in the United States
- The Celluloid Closet
