= Dirty looks =

Dirty Looks may refer to:

- Dirty Looks (album), a 1983 album by Juice Newton
- Dirty Looks (non-profit), a queer film collective in New York City and Los Angeles, California
- Dirty Looks (New York band), an American rock band from Staten Island, New York
- Dirty Looks (Pennsylvania band), an American rock band from Erie, Pennsylvania, also known in San Francisco, California
- "Dirty Looks" (song), a 1987 song by Diana Ross
- "Dirty Looks", a song by Electric Six from the album I Shall Exterminate Everything Around Me That Restricts Me from Being the Master
