= The Run, Los Angeles =

The Run is a gay village in Downtown Los Angeles. The area was prominent from the 1920s to the 1960s, and is experiencing a 21st-century revival.

== History ==
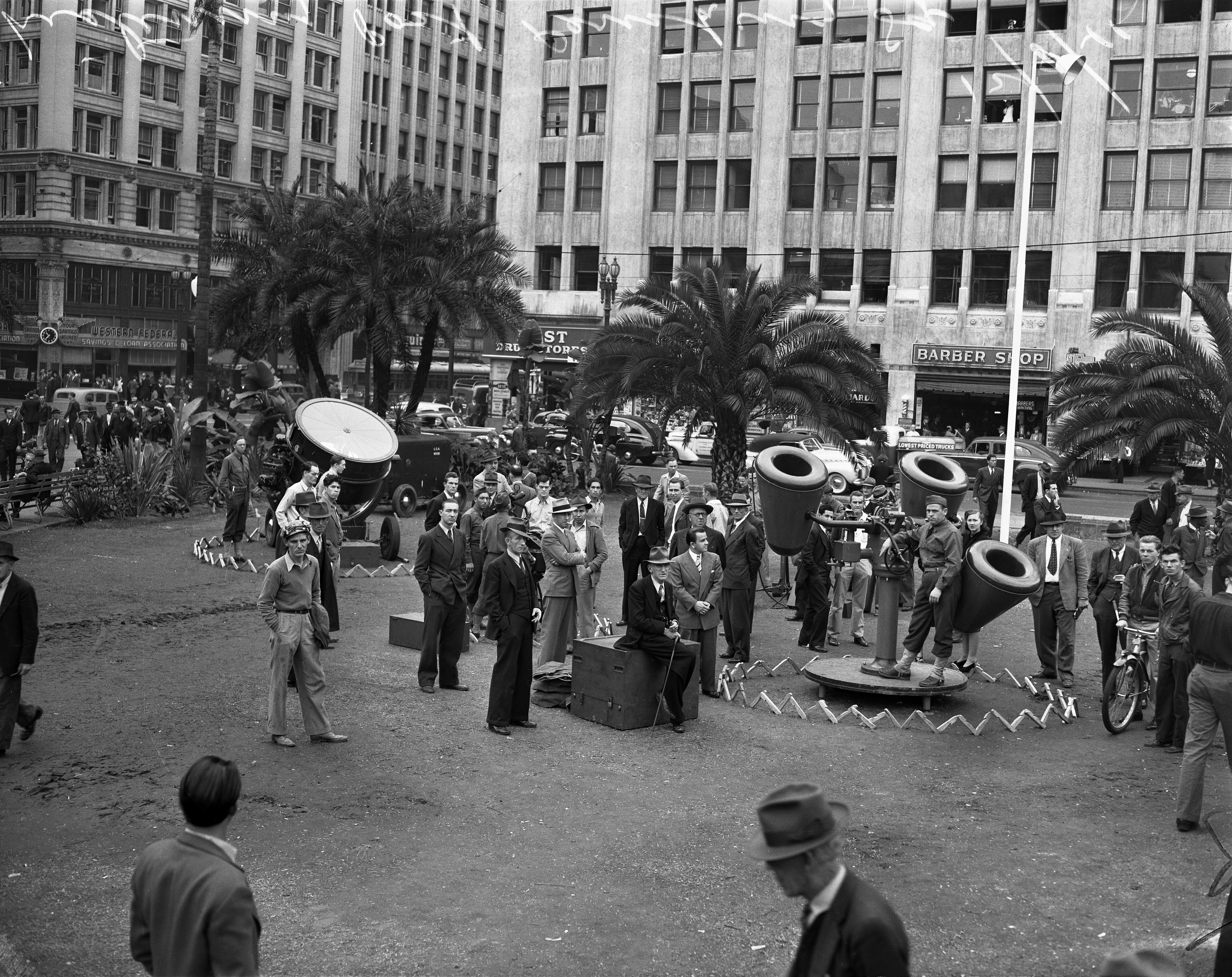
Pershing Square in 1941

Historically, the Run was centered around Pershing Square and included much of Downtown's Historic Core. From the 1920s to the 1960s, the area hosted numerous gay-friendly establishments and cruising locations, such as the Los Angeles Central Library, the Grand Avenue Bar at The Biltmore Hotel, and the Subway Terminal Building restrooms.

In 1951, the park at Pershing Square was ripped out to make way for a three-level, subterranean parking garage. As a result, the dense foliage was removed, functioning as a form of deterrent for crime, including cruising. The square gradually fell into disuse and disrepair throughout the 1960s and 1970s. By this time, Los Angeles's primary "gayborhood" had shifted westward to Silver Lake.

=== Revival ===
In 2005, the Jalisco Inn bar rebranded to The New Jalisco Bar, a "jotería space" for the Latinx community. In 2015, the revival of Downtown's LGBT+ nightlife "reached critical mass" with the opening of gay bars Bar Mattachine, Precinct, and Redline. The following year, Pershing Square began to host the DTLA Proud Festival. Several businesses have opened since, including 10 DTLA, Bar Franca, and Kiso.

In 2023, a collaboration between DTLA Proud, Los Angeles City Councilmember Kevin de León and community stakeholders led to the revival of "the Run," with the addition of Pride flag banners, murals, rainbow crosswalks, and rainbow LED string lighting.
