= Dallas Black Pride =

Black LGBT festival in Texas, US

- Status: Active
- Genre: Pride parade, Juneteenth
- Inaugurated: 1996
- Attendance: 15,000 (est.)

Dallas Black Pride (also known as Dallas Southern Pride) is an annual five-day event to celebrate the emerging black LGBT community in the Dallas–Fort Worth metroplex. The event has been in existence since 1996. It is held in conjunction with the State Fair of Texas and State Fair Classic in Dallas every fall (late September/early October). Dallas Her Pride is the official women's host of Dallas Black Pride. Annually, about 15,000 people participate in the planned pride events, making it the largest black gay pride event in Texas and one of the largest in the nation.

== Juneteenth Weekend ==
Juneteenth Weekend is traditionally the first black gay pride event of the year in Dallas. As with the black pride event in the fall, there are many locals and visitors participating in the special events and celebrations empowering the black LGBT community in the Dallas-Fort Worth metroplex.

== See also ==
- History of African Americans in Dallas–Fort Worth
- LGBT culture in Dallas–Fort Worth
- African-American LGBT community
