= Turtle Creek Chorale =

American men's chorus

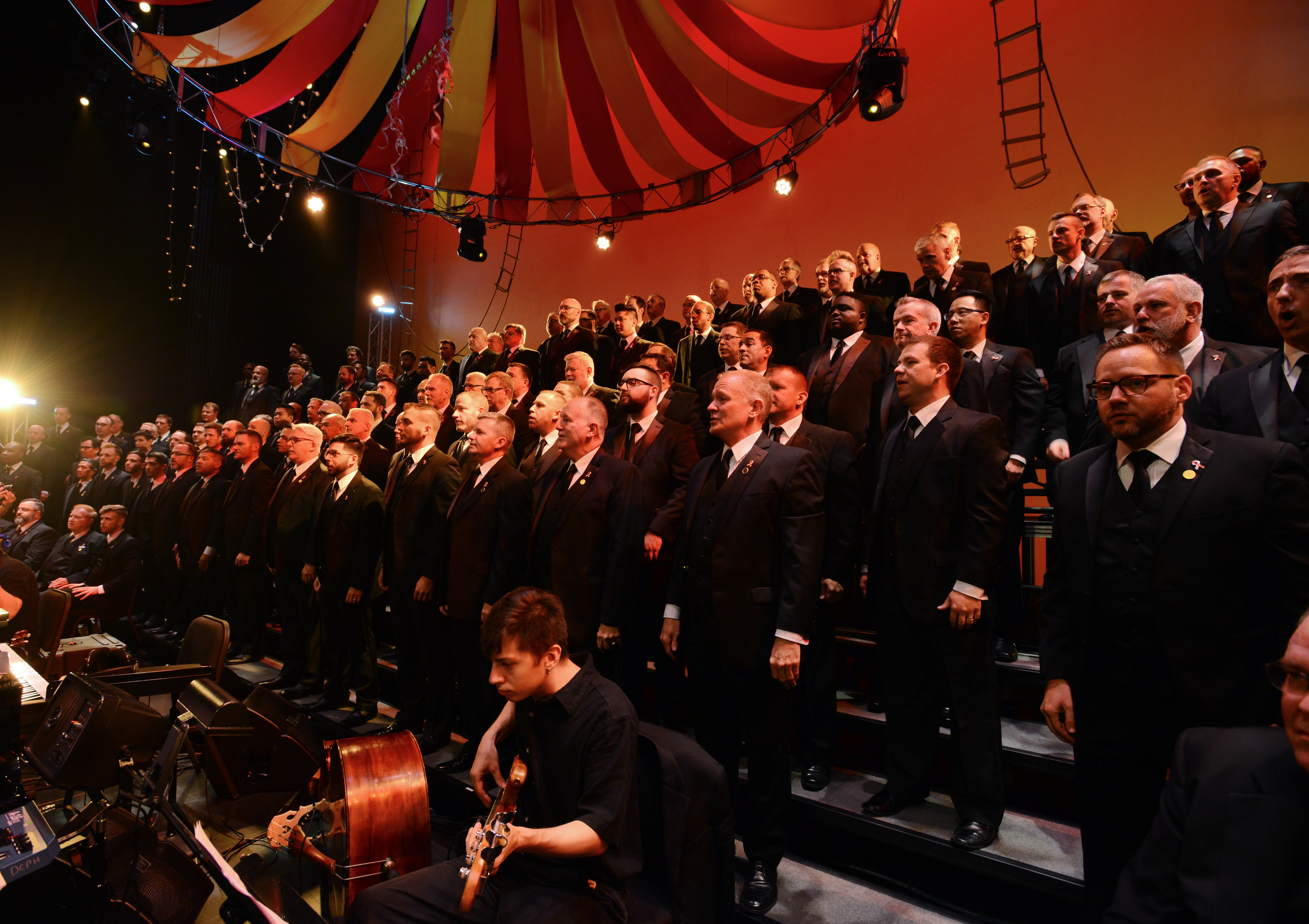
- Turtle Creek Chorale during the 2016-2017 spring season mainstage show "Topsy Turvy."

Background information
- Also known as: TCC
- Origin: Dallas, Texas, United States
- Genres: Choral, jazz, popular
- Occupation: Men's Choir
- Years active: 1980–present
- Label: Reference Recordings
- Members: More than 200 voices
- Website: turtlecreekchorale.com
- STAFF Artistic Director; Sean Baugh; Executive Director; Jeremy Wayne; Associate Conductor & Principal Pianist; Scott Ayers; Director of Patron Experience; Jason Crane Director of Marketing & Development; Mike Dilbeck

The Turtle Creek Chorale (TCC) is an American men's chorus located in Dallas, Texas. With 38 recordings and two commercially produced, feature-length motion picture documentaries in public distribution, it is among the most recorded men's choruses in the world.

Founded February 19, 1980, and currently featuring more than 200 singing members, the Chorale performs a full concert series annually to live audiences in excess of 20,000.

While primarily a gay men's chorus, the Turtle Creek Chorale welcomes all men, and those that identify as male, regardless of sexual orientation.

TCC also performs more than 30 benefit appearances annually. Recent partnerships and collaborations include Lone Star Rides, LifeWalk, Genesis Women's Shelter, Children's Medical Center, Hope's Door, Parkland Hospital, and the American Airlines Sky Ball.

== Performance highlights ==
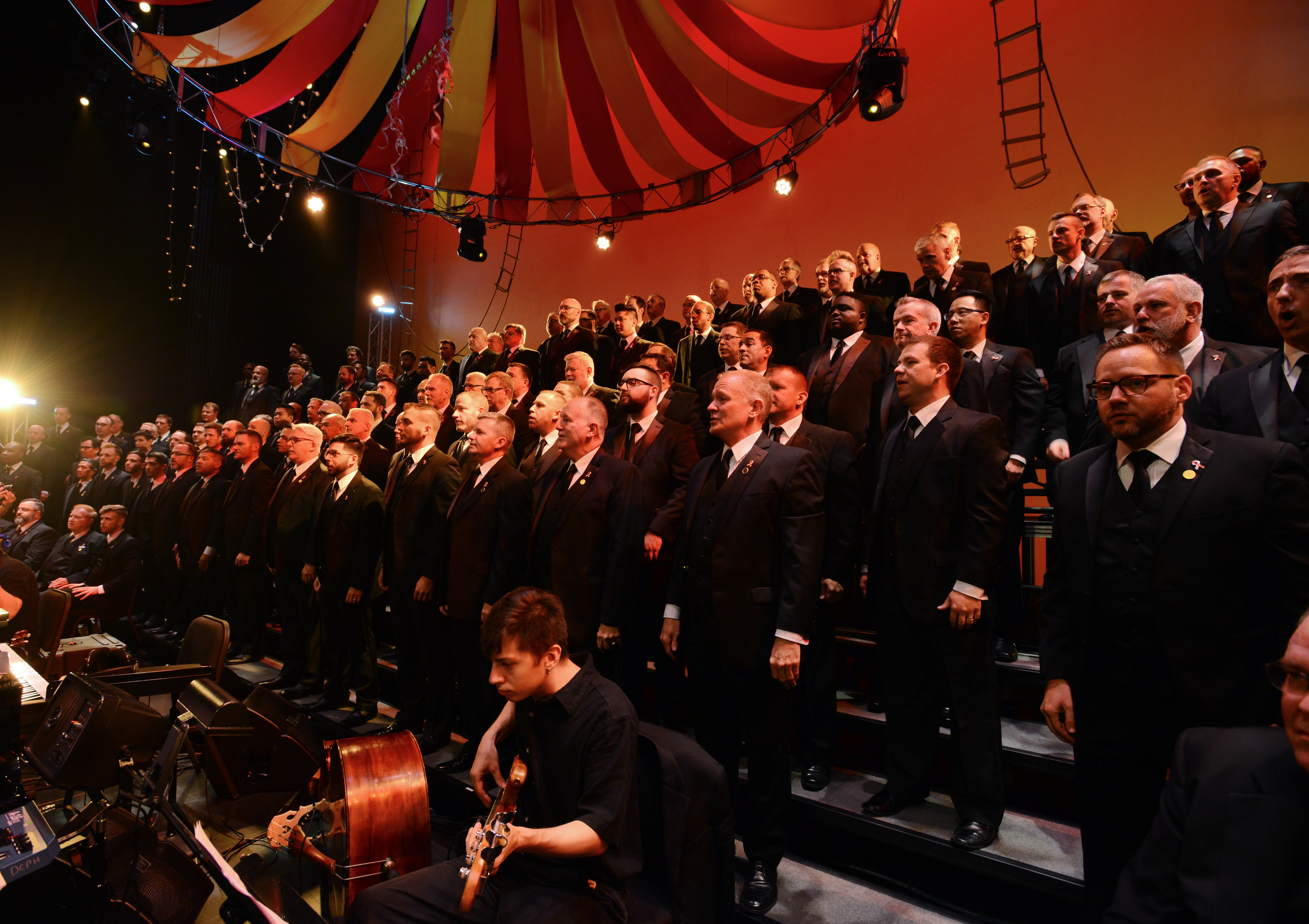
Turtle Creek Chorale

Performances by the Chorale have included two state, two regional and three national conventions of the American Choral Directors Association as well as a regional convention of Music Educators National Conference. The Chorale has traveled to Europe, performing sold-out concerts in Barcelona, Berlin, and Prague as well as two appearances at Carnegie Hall.

The TCC has sung in a command performance for such notables as Queen Elizabeth II of the United Kingdom, former President of the United States, George H. W. Bush, the inauguration of Texas Governor, Ann Richards, and in 1996 for the inauguration of the City of Dallas Mayor Ron Kirk. These accomplishments were made with one purpose in mind—the enhancement of the musical and cultural life of its audiences through the presentation of male chorus music.

The Chorale collaborated with Susan G. Komen Foundation to create “Sing for the Cure” with narrations by Dr. Maya Angelou. TCC has performed twice with the U.S. Army Chorus and shared the stage with Liza Minnelli, Joan Rivers, Sandi Patty, Gavin Creel, Jennifer Holliday, Nikki Blonski, Margaret Cho, Tom Wopat, Seth Rudetsky, Patti LuPone, and Cyndi Lauper.

== History ==
The Turtle Creek Chorale was formed February 19, 1980 under the guidance of its founding artistic director and conductor, Harry E. Scher. At its first rehearsal at Holy Trinity Catholic Church in Dallas, 39 charter members attended. The administrative staff was composed of volunteers. In 1990, the TCC had grown to 150 members and two full-time paid staff. Today, nearly 200 singing members, several non-singing associate members, a staff and a board of directors constitute the TCC.

1980s

In 1982, Dr. Richard L. Fleming was announced the TCC Artistic Director and Musical Conductor. The Chorale received its first musical honor by being selected the state winner of the Johnny Mann Great American Choral Festival under his direction.

2000s

On June 29, 2008 the Turtle Creek Chorale had their name launched to the moon as part of the LRO or Lunar Reconnaissance Project "Send your name to the Moon" project, certificate number 1684788.

== Leadership: Artistic Director ==
- 1980: Harry E. Scher
- 1982: Dr. Richard L. Fleming
- 1984: Michael Crawford
- 1987: Dr. Timothy Seelig
- 2007: Dr. Jonathan Palant
- 2011: Trey Jacobs (Interim Conductor)
- 2012: Trey Jacobs
- 2014: Sean Baugh (Interim Conductor)
- 2015: Sean Baugh

== Discography ==
- From the Heart (1990)
- When We No Longer Touch (1991)
- Peace (1991)
- Testament (1992)
- Requiem (1993)
- United We Sing (1994)
- A Roamin' Holiday (1994)
- Everything's Possible (1994, 2001)
- Postcards (1994)
- Let Music Live (1995)
- Family (1995)
- Times of the Day (1995)
- The Gershwin Scrapbook (1996)
- Simply Christmas (1996)
- Celebrate (1997)
- Lifelong Friend (1998)
- Reflections (1997)
- Twisted Turtle Tinsel (1997)
- Best of the Turtle Creek Chorale (1999)
- Psalms (1999)
- Personals (2000)
- Sing for the Cure (2000)
- Song of Wisdom from Old Turtle (2000)
- Turtle Mix (2000)
- Two Worlds with Buddy Shanahan (2001)
- Comfort and Joy (2001)
- Turtle Creek Chorale Recordings Sampler (2001)
- To A Dancing Star (2002)
- A Testament to Freedom (2002)
- One World (2002)
- Celestial (2003)
- Annie's Songs (2004)
- The Holy and The Holly (2004)
- Journey (2004)
- Holiday Memories (2005)
- Songs of Our Nation (2006)
- Serenade (May 2007)
- A Fond Farewell (July 2007)
- Believe (November 2009)

== Affiliations ==
- American Choral Directors Association (ACDA)
- Associated Male Choruses of America, Inc.
- Chorus America
- GALA Choruses (Gay and Lesbian Association of Choruses)
- The International Federation of Choral Music
- National Academy of Recording Arts and Sciences
- City of Dallas Office of Cultural Affairs (OCA)
- Texas Commission on the Arts

== See also ==
- LGBT culture in Dallas–Fort Worth
