= LGBTQ culture in Dallas–Fort Worth =

Throughout Dallas–Fort Worth, there is a large lesbian, gay, bisexual, and transgender community. Since 2005, DFW has constituted one of the largest LGBT communities in Texas.

== History ==
The first pro-LGBT event in DFW occurred in 1972; it was an unorganized march in Downtown Dallas. The first official gay pride parade took place in June 1980. Since then, both the Dallas and Fort Worth metropolitan divisions of the Metroplex have held their own separate gay pride festivals.

== Geography ==
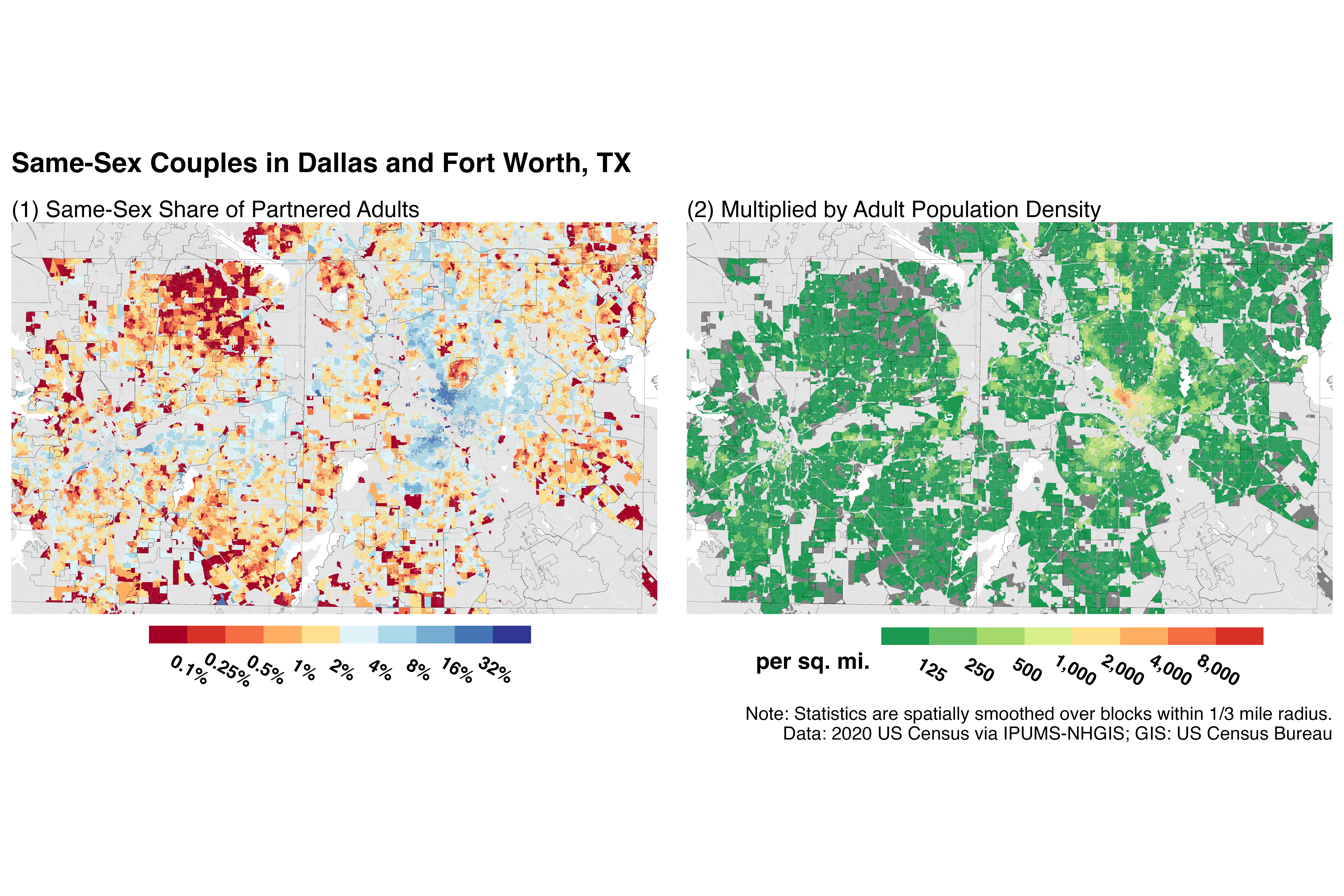
Map of same-sex couples in Dallas-Fort Worth

The Oak Lawn/Cedar Springs Road area serves as North Texas' largest gayborhood and is home to Dallas' vibrant gay nightlife. The first LGBT-oriented business to open there was Union Jack, a clothing store operated by an expatriate from the United Kingdom, Richard Longstaff. It opened in 1971 and moved to Cedar Springs Road around 1972. It announced that it was closing in 2014. It was open for 42 years. Bishop Arts is the other known gayborhood in Dallas. There's a notable number of gay residents, along with a few popular gay-centric/gay-friendly establishments. Tallywackers, a male version of Hooter's, opened on May 30, 2015, and closed in 2016 in the city of Dallas. It was owned by Rodney Duke. Its customer base included homosexual men and straight women. In Fort Worth, there is also a large LGBT community spread throughout the city.

== Institutions ==
In 1994 Community Center established the Phil Johnson Historic Archives and Research Library. The University of North Texas Libraries acquired this facility in 2012. This library holds archival information related the DFW LGBT community. The producers of the Dallas Buyers Club film used this archive.

The Stonewall Democrats of Dallas is an LGBT political club in the area. Gay for Good also has a Dallas–Fort Worth chapter.

The Resource Center opened its 20,000-square-foot building in 2016; the $8.7 million project is located in Oaklawn and is one of the largest LGBT community centers in the nation.

Due to the high HIV/AIDS infection rate among young black gay men in Dallas County, the University of California, San Francisco researchers in partnership with original project coordinators Venton Jones, Terrance Anderson, and community organizer Chaaz Quigley decided to establish the United Black Ellument in Dallas. United Black Ellument (UBE), which had a cost of $1.6 million, is aimed at lowering infection rates in the Black LGBT community in Dallas. Researchers and Black LGBT community leaders study and promote safer sex habits in the Black LGBT community. The program includes social coffee hours every week, discussion panels, worship services, fashion shows, safer sex promotions, support groups, and picnics. Over 500 black gay and bisexual men have been participants. UBE is based near Downtown Dallas.

== Politics and activism ==
In 2002 the Dallas City Council passed an anti-discrimination ordinance protecting LGBT persons. As of 2014 the city of Dallas pays an inferior pension to same-sex couples relative to its pension for opposite sex couples. John Wright, a former editor of the Dallas Voice, stated that the city is not complying with its own anti-discrimination ordinance and that "It's unbelievable to me that in 2014, the city of Dallas is still treating its LGBT employees unequally when it comes to basic benefits like pensions, family medical leave and transgender health insurance."

In 2004 Lupe Valdez, a Latina lesbian, was elected as the sheriff of Dallas; she was the first woman, Latina, and gay person to hold this position.

After she began her first term in the Dallas City Council in 2007, Vonciel Jones-Hill, who is also a Methodist preacher, stated that she would not and never will attend the gay pride parade; she argued that God does not approve of homosexuality. The Dallas Voice criticized her because of her stance. In 2009 she was the only member of the Dallas City Council to not attend.

Around 2009 the city of Dallas formed an LGBT task force. Delia Jasso, a member of the Dallas City Council, had created this taskforce.

In early 2013 Scott Griggs, a member of the Dallas City Council, announced that he was writing a pro-LGBT resolution; the resolution asked to allow same-sex couples to have the same marriage rights as opposite sex couples. By April he had filed the resolution, and he stated that it had enough votes to pass. The city council vote was scheduled for June 12 of that year. Mayor of Dallas Mike Rawlings criticized the proposal, arguing that because the city has no political power to enact gay marriage, it would be a "waste of time" to vote on this bill; Rawlings stated that he supports same sex marriage. Kingston argued that Dallas may be "left behind" if it does not pass this resolution. Rawlings quashed this resolution.

By June 2013 the Dallas County Health and Human Services put up a billboard, titled "Check Your Status", that asks men who have sex with men to get HIV tested. This billboard, intended to combat HIV infections in African-American men, depicts two men in a relationship. In response, Jones-Hill stated that the billboard presents same-sex conduct among African-American men as acceptable as long as they safeguard their health.

By February 2014 a committee of the Dallas city council voted to adopt a "comprehensive statement of support" for LGBT Dallasites and city government employees. Rawlings supported this measure, and the council passed it in March of that year. Wright argued that the resolution does not go far enough.

Established in 1982, the Black Tie Dinner has become one of the largest fundraiser events in the nation for the LGBT community. The event raises funds for the LGBT supportive organizations serving North Texas through a premier event of empowerment, education and entertainment in partnership with the community. To date, Black Tie Dinner has distributed nearly $20 million. The event is held every fall.

In 2016 John P. McCall, who had been featured in the Dallas Voice and the Wall Street Journal for his legal work with LGBTQ family law in Dallas, was appointed as the first openly gay Justice of the Peace in Texas in Dallas' Precinct 5, Place 1.

== Media ==
The Dallas Voice is the LGBT newspaper of Dallas. Dallas Voice first published in May 1984.

A gay reality series based in Dallas named The A-List: Dallas premiered on Logo TV in fall 2011.

== Education ==
Jose Plata, an openly gay Dallas Independent School District (DISD) board member, and Pat Stone, the president of the Dallas Parents and Friends of Lesbians and Gays (PFLAG), advocated for adding LGBT students to the DISD anti-discrimination ordinance. In 1996 the DISD board of education voted to add LGBT individuals to the ordinance, and by 1997 the district had created a pamphlet for LGBT students.

In 1997, the Walt Whitman Community School, a private alternative high school catering to those who identify as LGBT, opened in Dallas. It was the United States's first LGBT-oriented private school. The school closed in 2004.

The Oak Lawn Library in Oak Lawn, Dallas has a 1,729-item collection of LGBT-related literature; it had a circulation of 3,748 as of 2012, and that year Angie Bartula, the branch manager, stated that it was one of the largest LGBT-related collections in the United States.

== Recreation ==
There are two gay pride parades held in Dallas: the Alan Ross Freedom Parade or Dallas Pride, and the parade by QueerBomb Dallas. The first official Dallas Pride was held in June 1980. In 1983 the Tavern Guild took control of Dallas Pride. That year, the Tavern Guild moved the celebration from June to the third Sunday of September in honor of Baker v. Wade. The celebration moved back to June in 2019.

The annual Purple Party is one of the largest circuit parties in the world. The event raises funds to assist those living with HIV/AIDS.

In 2014 QueerBomb Dallas criticized Dallas Pride for accepting sponsorship from Heineken; Heineken has no protections for transgender employees, and Barry Andrews, the owner of Heineken, had hosted a fundraiser for Dan Patrick, a politician who took anti-LGBT stances. QueerBomb Dallas organizes their own Pride rally, march and party on the last weekend in June.

Around 1981 a drag queen established the annual Tarrant County Pride (Fort Worth and Arlington) event. Originally it was held on Jennings Street but in 2011 the venue changed to Downtown Fort Worth. Thomas Anable helped move the parade to its current location. In 2011 Mayor of Fort Worth Betsy Price served as the Grand Marshal. Also the Fort Worth (Tarrant County) gay community established an annual gay & lesbian film festival (QCinema), gay rodeo, and eight gay bars/clubs.

The Out Takes Dallas Lesbian & Gay Film Festival occurs in Dallas.

The PlayPride LGBT Festival, an annual playwright competition held by the TeCo Theatrical Productions, held its first event in 2014.

In 1980, the Turtle Creek Chorale was founded. It has become the largest and most prominent predominately gay men chorus in Texas. In 1989, Dallas' first predominately lesbian chorus was formed called The Women's Chorus of Dallas.

Since its opening in 1989, Sue Ellen's has been one of the largest and most popular lesbian bars in the nation. In 2014, Sue Ellen's was ranked as one of the Top 10 lesbian bars in the nation by BuzzFeed LGBT.

The Texas Bear Round-Up (TBRU) is one of the largest annual Bear community events in the world and the largest in Texas. It began in 1995.

1996 marked the first year of Dallas Black Pride. The celebratory event has grown to be the largest of its kind in Texas and continues to be held every fall.

The Texas Latino Gay Pride event began in 2014 and is held annually every early October in the Oaklawn district. It is the first event of its kind in Texas.

== Religion ==
As of 2023 the Cathedral of Hope, a Dallas United Church of Christ (UCC), an LGBT-friendly church, has 3,000 members, making it one of the largest UCC in the United States. Cathedral of Hope, UCC is the largest LGBT church in the world.

== See also ==
- LGBT rights in Texas
- Demographics of Dallas-Fort Worth
