= The Doughboy (Los Angeles) =

Monument in Los Angeles, California, U.S.

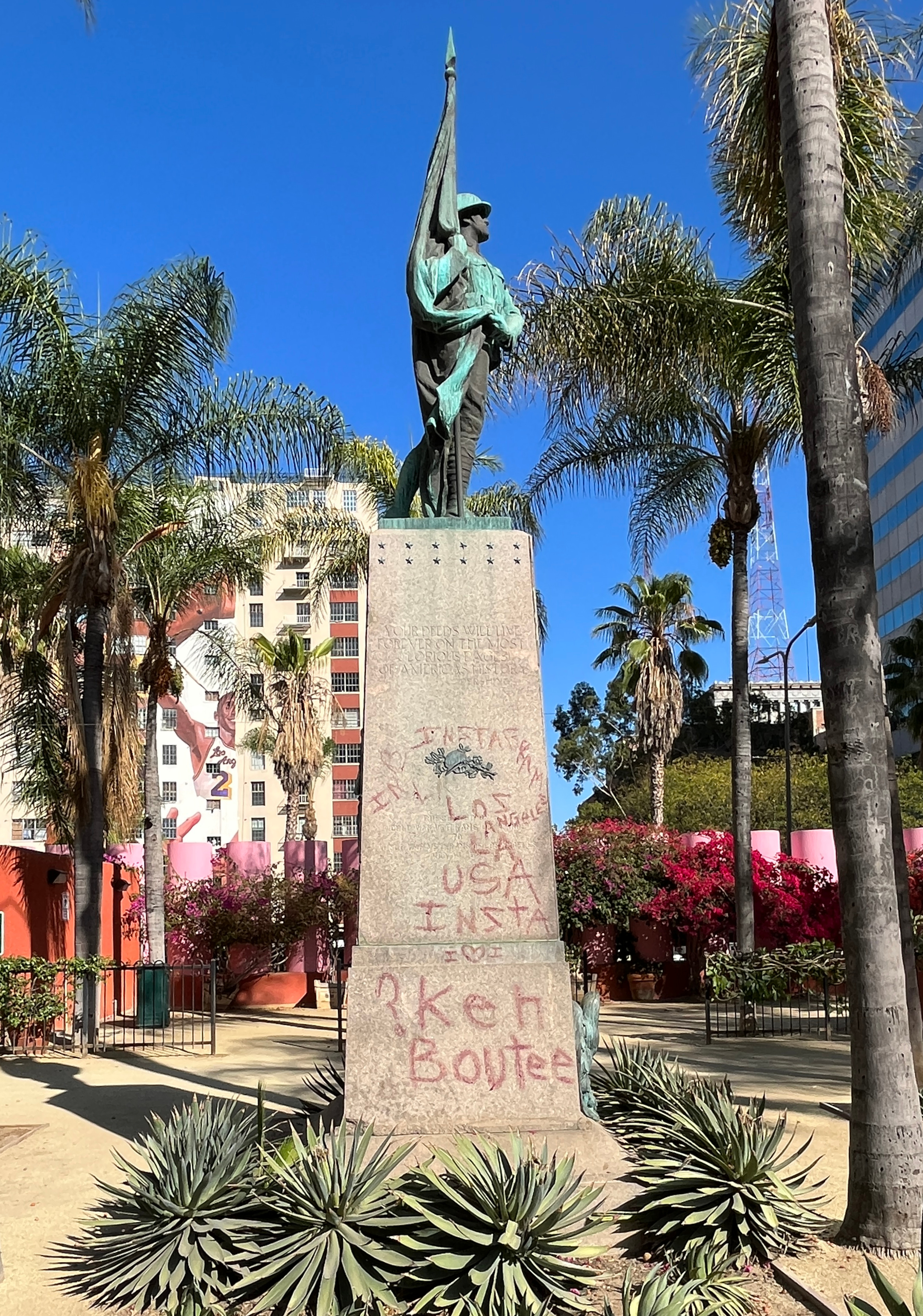
- The memorial in 2022
- Location: Los Angeles, California, U.S.
- 34°2′54.7″N 118°15′9.2″W

The Doughboy is a sculpture installed in Los Angeles' Pershing Square, in the U.S. state of California. It was dedicated in 1924. The inscription reads: "Dedicated to the sons and daughters of Los Angeles who participated in World War, 1917-1918".
