= Los Angeles Blade =

American LGBT newspaper

- The front page of Los Angeles Blade on March 24, 2017
- Type: Bi-weekly LGBT newspaper
- Format: Tabloid
- Owner: Brown Naff Pitts Omnimedia Inc.
- Founder: Troy Masters
- Publisher: Alexander Rodriguez
- Editor: Gisselle Palomera
- Founded: 2017
- Language: English
- Headquarters: Los Angeles, United States
- Circulation: 40,000 (as of 2024)*
- OCLC number: 1456441792
- Website: losangelesblade.com

The Los Angeles Blade is an LGBT+ newspaper launched in 2017 as an offshoot of the Washington Blade. The newspaper covers news, politics, opinion, arts and entertainment in the Los Angeles area, and includes some national and international coverage from the Washington Blade. The Blade has been called the newspaper of record for Los Angeles' LGBT+ community.

== History ==
=== Masters era (2017-2024) ===
Following his departure from The Pride LA in 2017, publisher Troy Masters launched the Los Angeles Blade as a biweekly newspaper to serve "the second largest market in the country, and one that was underserved by alternative media." The newspaper began as a sister publication of the Washington Blade. Production was hastened in response to the election of Donald Trump, with Kevin Naff, co-owner of Blade parent company Brown Naff Pitts Omnimedia Inc., remarking in 2017 that "A lot of cities, including L.A., are changing the tones of their parades, from a celebration to more of a protest. We wanted to be part of that, a kind of voice in that process."

In 2018, the Los Angeles Blade announced plans to publish a weekly print edition, thereby becoming first weekly LGBT+ media product serving Los Angeles since the mid-1980s. The newspaper was also announced as a media partner of Los Angeles Pride.

During the 2022 mpox outbreak in California, the Los Angeles Blade hosted two town hall meetings — one in West Hollywood and another in Monterey Park — to alert residents to the emerging threat.

Beginning with the January 5, 2024 issue, the Los Angeles Blade reverted to a bi-weekly schedule. In August 2024, the newspaper, seeking to address the changing news needs resulting from historic demographic shifts in Southern California, announced a partnership with CALÓ News, a Latinx community-focused news outlet. Soon thereafter, the newspaper announced Gisselle Palomera as the News Editor. Following publisher Troy Masters' sudden death on December 11, 2024, the newspaper's management team announced that the organization would continue under the leadership of Gisselle Palomera.

=== Rodriguez era (2025-present) ===
Following the reelection of Donald Trump, editor Gisselle Palomera stated "As we step into the next four years, we will continue to experience the onslaught of hateful rhetoric against LGBTQ+ people and we will continue to be used as pawns in the political chess game that has pushed us into the margins. We will have to double-down on our efforts to not only exist, but to thrive." In February 2025, Alexander Rodriguez was appointed as the publisher of the newspaper.

In April 2025, the newspaper launched a free community event series as an open forum to present the current political climate as it affects Southern California for the LGBT+ community and beyond. The inaugural event is a panel discussion held at The Abbey, featuring Chris Baldwin of NAACP's LGBTQ+ Committee, Nico Brancolini of Stonewall Democratic Club, West Hollywood mayor Chelsea Byers, former West Hollywood mayor Abbe Land, and Jorge Reyes Salinas of Equality California.

== Circulation and demographics ==
News coverage focuses mainly on global and regional political issues concerning LGBT+ persons with additional coverage of entertainment and nightlife in the Los Angeles area. The Blade is distributed throughout Southern California, with a focus on areas with significant LGBT+ populations, such as West Hollywood, Silver Lake, and Los Feliz, and as far as Palm Springs. Distribution points include businesses with a large number of LGBT+ clients, including restaurants, bars, gyms, gay bathhouses and the Los Angeles LGBT Center, and home delivery is available in select West Hollywood and Hollywood residential neighborhoods.

Overall, 48% of the Blade's readership holds a college degree.

== Awards and recognition ==
In 2023, the newspaper received the GLAAD Excellence in Media Award.

For its coverage of HIV news, the newspaper was the runner-up in the "Health and Health Care" category at the 2024 California Ethnic Media Awards.

== See also ==
- The New York Blade
- The Pride LA
- Washington Blade
