= Liquid Shard =

Public art

Liquid Shard was a temporary kinetic sculpture on display in Pershing Square in Los Angeles, California from July 28 through August 11, 2016. The temporary installation was part of Patrick Shearn of Poetic Kinetics' Skynet Series. The second work of this series, Shearn came up with the site-specific design after being approached by the Los Angeles Recreation and Parks Department and Now Art LA to create a public art installation for Pershing Square.

The piece consisted of holographic mylar strips arranged in a long ribbon-like canopy that was 15,000 ft² (1,400 m^{2}) in surface area. It was designed to move with the wind and weather conditions.

Architectural Digest commented upon the work, calling it a "mesmerizing kinetic sculpture comprising hundreds of silver streamers" that would "[leave] passersby feeling as if they’re strolling beneath the sea’s rolling waves". Los Angeles Magazine also remarked on the installation, which they felt "[brought] a little delight to an urban eyesore".
