= EAGLES Academy =

Location
- 7060 Hollywood Blvd. Hollywood, Los Angeles, California 90028; United States

Information
- Type: Public high school
- Established: 1992
- Founder: Jerry B. Battey
- Closed: 2004
- Principal: Jerry B. Battey
- Grades: 7–12
- Enrollment: 35 students (1999)
- Campus: Urban
- Affiliations: Los Angeles Unified School District

EAGLES Academy Central High School (also known as EAGLES Academy Hollywood and EAGLES Center) was a public high school located in Hollywood, Los Angeles, with the target group of but not limited to gay, lesbian, bisexual, and transgender young people, as well as those questioning their sexuality and educational dropouts. It was founded and opened in 1992 along with the "Educational Options" program by the Los Angeles Unified School District (LAUSD); it closed down in 2004. It was the first public high school designed for LGBT youth from grade 7 onwards in the United States.

== History ==
EAGLES Academy Central High School was a public high school run by the department of "Educational Options" of the LAUSD, also known as EAGLES Academy Hollywood and EAGLES Center. EAGLES is an acronym from "Emphasizing Adolescent Gay Lesbian Education Services." The target group of this school was gay, lesbian, bisexual, and transgender students, as well as those questioning their sexuality and educational dropouts, but being a high school run by the state, it was also open for straight students. The mission statement was A safe place for youth to receive their education.

The school was supervised by Ruben Zacarias, in that time period LAUSD's superintendent of schools in charge, Elizabeth Newman, the options administrator, and Sunshine S. Sepulveda, an educational advisor to LAUSD. Founder and principal of the school was Jerry B. Battey, an English teacher, from 1992 to 2004.

In 1996, the school had two campuses, one in Hollywood and a branch located in the South Bay area of Los Angeles.

In 1999, eleven teachers worked at EAGLES.

In the same year, there were also one full-time and four part-time volunteer school counselors.

The school was closed in the summer of 2004 due to financial shortages by the LAUSD. Although there was a tax-exempt organization called "Friends of EAGLES Center – Los Angeles, Inc." for raising money and commodity contributions, it was impossible to keep the school alive based only on donations.

== Student body and activities ==
EAGLES Center started in 1992 with twelve students. Later in 1992, 35 students were enrolled at EAGLES.

EAGLES Center initiated the first prom for LGBT students for the school, open for students from other high schools in the school district. It was advertised in the media as an open invitation for the first prom of its kind in the nation. On May 20, 1994, it took place in the Los Angeles Hilton hotel. A group of protesters can be seen in the documentary film that was made about it.

At the first graduation ceremony held in Plummer Park in West Hollywood in 1994, six seniors received their diplomas.

== Curriculum and external support ==
The curriculum followed the Carnegie Unit and Student Hour system with 45-minute units in core subjects like English, science, social studies, and mathematics plus German and Spanish as second languages.

A long-term collaboration between EAGLES and the California Institute of the Arts (CalArts) patronized several graduates to develop their talents like Marc Imme to become an actor, later known for the role of "Luke" in Ryan's Life (2004), and Miguel Lopez, the playwright of Mariposas (2001), a play for children.

In statewide comparisons, the students of EAGLE reached in the Junior to Senior ratings of 1998 (known as the "Stanford 9 Assessment tests") six stars.

== Criticism ==
In 2001, some students graduated from EAGLES Academy without fulfilling all requirements.

== Media ==
- EAGLES Center: Live to Tell: The First Gay and Lesbian Prom in America, a film by Charley Lang, VHS videocassette, color, 24 minutes, The Cinema Guild, New York City, 1995.

== See also ==
- LGBT culture in Los Angeles
- Harvey Milk High School
- Walt Whitman Community School
