= Statue of Ludwig van Beethoven (Los Angeles) =

Sculpture in Los Angeles, California, U.S.

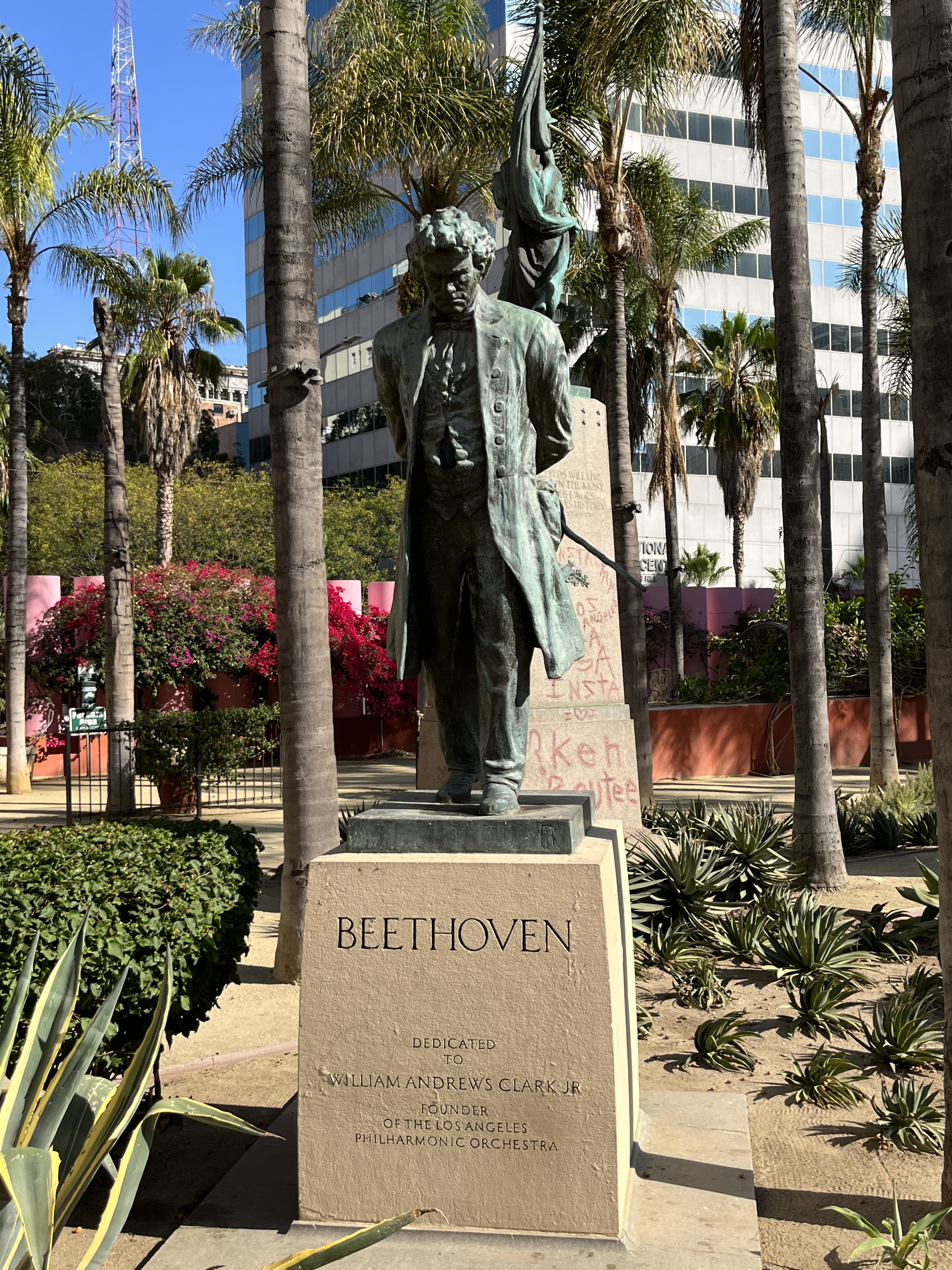
- The statue in 2022
- Subject: Ludwig van Beethoven
- Location: Los Angeles, California, U.S.; 34°2′54.9″N 118°15′9.1″W

A statue of Ludwig van Beethoven is installed in Los Angeles' Pershing Square, in the U.S. state of California.

== See also ==
- List of sculptures of Ludwig van Beethoven
