= Troy Masters =

American journalist (1961–2024)

- Born: April 13, 1961; Gallatin, Tennessee, U.S.
- Died: December 11, 2024 (aged 63); Los Angeles, California, U.S.
- Education: University of Tennessee
- Known for: Founder of Gay City News, Los Angeles Blade

Troy Masters (April 13, 1961 – December 11, 2024) was an American journalist and editor, most active in LGBTQ news publications.

== Life and career ==
Masters was born in Gallatin, Tennessee, on April 13, 1961, to Josie Kirkland and Jimmy Davis Masters. He was raised in Nashville, where his stepfather worked as a musician, and spent summers in Dothan, Alabama, where his grandparents lived. He grew up in an environment which had "bile racial invective and raw hatred of liberal ideas", which he characterized as "a Fox News household before Fox News". Around age 12, Masters realized he was gay after becoming obsessed with musician David Cassidy and attending his concert in Nashville. His family also caught on to this fact, and his stepfather and his friends often taunted him with slurs and derogatory names. He left home at age 17. He graduated from the University of Tennessee.

Masters lived in New York City in the 1980s, and credited his dedication to LGBTQ media to his experiences seeing his friends die during the AIDS crisis. In 1988, Masters chose to leave his job at PC Magazine to work for the gay and lesbian magazine OutWeek. He was first credited in the magazine in issue 21, released November 12, 1989, as advertising account executive. He was a senior account executive by the magazine's final issue in July 1991. At OutWeek, Masters published stories about HIV activism and research, and anti-LGBTQ violence.

Following OutWeek's closure in 1991, Masters founded QW magazine, which closed after 18 months. In February 1995, Masters founded Lesbian and Gay New York (LGNY). In October 1997, it entered a "pint-sized newspaper war" with The New York Blade News, which Masters criticized for "having a straight-owned publishing company" and for not using the words "gay" or "lesbian" in its advertising. In 2002, the newspaper was relaunched as Gay City News (GCN). Masters remained with GCN until 2015.

In the late 1990s, Masters entered into a trial for an HIV vaccine, which he also wrote about.

Masters moved to Los Angeles in 2015. He first co-launched biweekly newspaper The Pride LA, but left the publication in mid-2016 over political disagreements. He then began working to create a sister publication to the Washington Blade. He established Los Angeles Blade in 2017. During the 2022 mpox outbreak in California, Masters "leveraged the newspaper’s influence...to ensure that the limited number of available vaccine doses were distributed in communities most at risk". In 2023, the Los Angeles Blade received the Barbara Gittings Award for Excellence in LGBTQ Media from GLAAD.

Masters died in Los Angeles on December 11, 2024, at the age of 63. According to the Los Angeles County Medical Examiner, he died by suicide.
