= Spanish–American War Memorial (Los Angeles) =

Monument in Los Angeles, California, U.S.

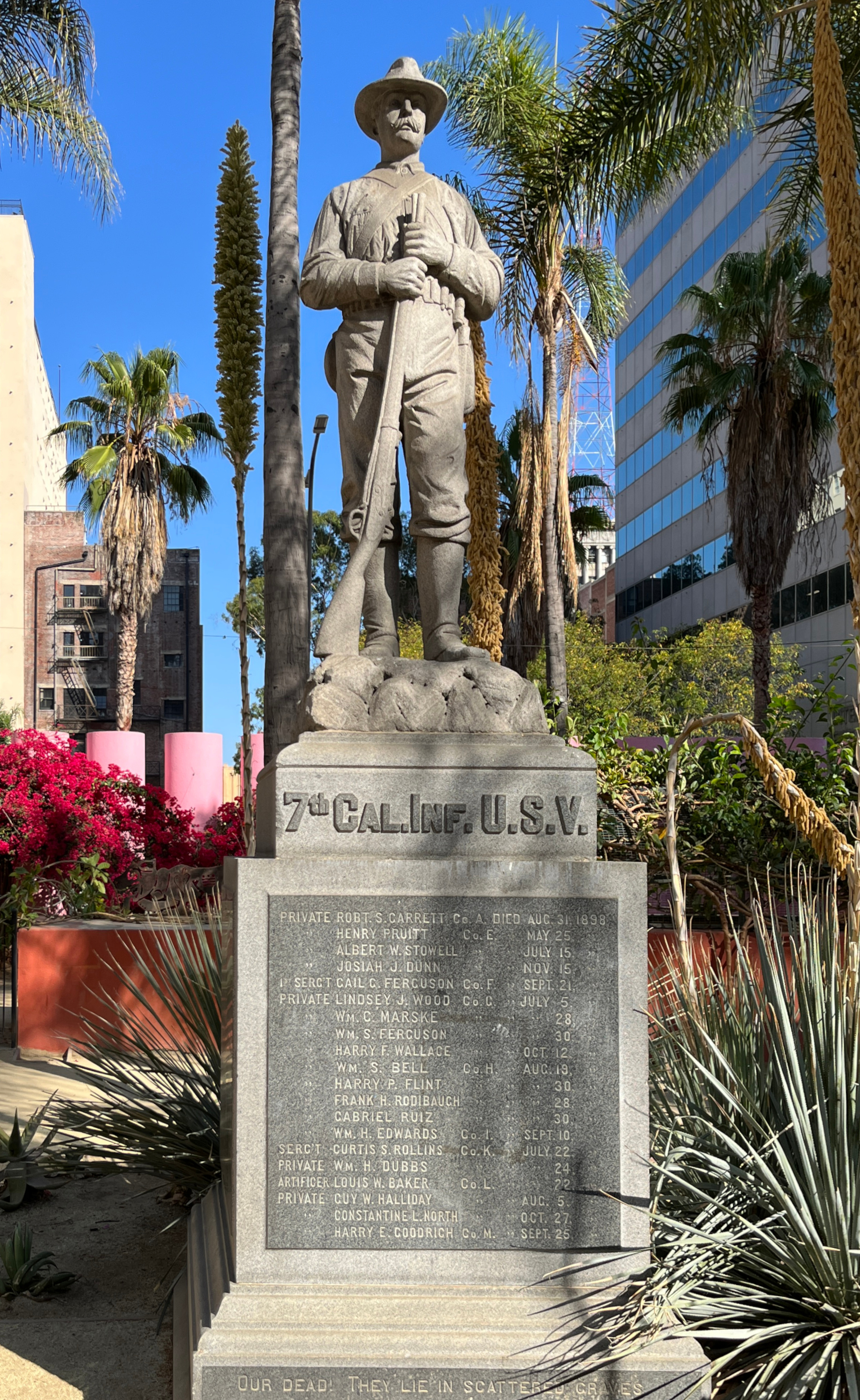
- The monument in 2022
- Location: Los Angeles, California, U.S.
- 34°2′54.4″N 118°15′9.3″W

The Spanish–American War Memorial, also known as the 7th Regiment Monument, is installed in Los Angeles' Pershing Square, in the U.S. state of California.

== See also ==
- List of Los Angeles Historic-Cultural Monuments in Downtown Los Angeles
