= QueerBomb Dallas =

LGBT celebration in Texas, US

- Genre: Pride parade
- Inaugurated: June 28, 2014
- Founders: Daniel Villarreal, Chaaz Quigley

QueerBomb Dallas is a public celebration of the lesbian, gay, bisexual, and transgender (LGBTQ) community in the Dallas–Fort Worth metroplex.

The QueerBomb Dallas Pride rally, march and celebration was held each June in recognition of LGBTQIA Pride Month. The event is set apart from most other Pride gatherings in that it is completely non corporate and community funded.

== History ==
In 2014, a group of activists – including writer Daniel Villarreal and community organizer Chaaz Quigley – had become increasingly dismayed by the corporate influence in the mainstream Dallas Pride events followed the lead of the QueerBomb group in Austin, Texas, and organized a non-corporate, Queer oriented, free-for-everyone Pride event.

The first QueerBomb Pride parade was held June 28, 2014.

== Philosophical underpinnings ==
The QueerBomb manifesto says, in part:

We strive for a pride that refuses to put rules on what you can and can’t be proud of, that says every expression, from the spirit to the flesh, is worthy. QueerBomb does not apologize. QueerBomb does not make excuses. QueerBomb is free for all. QueerBomb stands proud, and so should you.

== See also ==
- LGBT culture in Dallas–Fort Worth
