= Dallas Voice =

American LGBT weekly newspaper covering the Dallas, Texas area

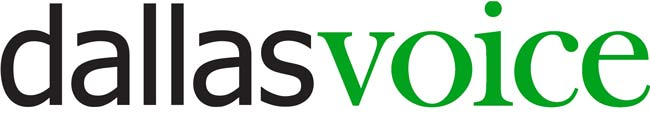
- Type: LGBT newspaper
- Owner(s): Voice Publishing Company, Inc.
- Founder(s): Robert Moore, Don Ritz, William Marberry
- Founded: May 11, 1984
- Language: English
- Headquarters: 1825 Market Center Blvd. Dallas, Texas
- Circulation: 13,000 weekly
- Sister newspapers: OUT North Texas
- ISSN: 0888-2517
- Website: www.dallasvoice.com

Dallas Voice is a weekly LGBT newspaper based in Dallas, Texas. Established on May 11, 1984, it was the first newspaper in Dallas created specifically to serve the LGBTQ+ community. Owned by Voice Publishing Company, Inc., the newspaper publishes every Friday, circulating approximately 13,000 copies per week in Dallas, Tarrant, Collin, Parker, and Denton counties, with a weekly print readership of over 30,000 and more than 128,000 monthly website visits.

For four decades, Dallas Voice has been the premier and enduring media source for the LGBTQ+ community in North Texas, evolving from a grassroots community newspaper to a trusted and influential "media machine".

== History ==
=== Founding and Early Years (1984–1989) ===
The Dallas Voice began with founders Robert Moore, Don Ritz, and William Marberry, initially operating from Oak Lawn Avenue. The newspaper emerged in a period of significant adversity, including legal challenges and the burgeoning HIV/AIDS crisis.

=== HIV/AIDS Epidemic ===
Dallas Voice played a critical role during the HIV/AIDS crisis, providing vital information and resources to the community. The epidemic significantly impacted the newspaper internally, claiming the lives of several staff members, including longtime editor Dennis Vercher.

=== Growth and Digital Transformation ===
Through leadership transitions, notably from founders Moore and Ritz to current publisher Leo Cusimano, and embracing digital platforms since launching its website in 1996, Dallas Voice has maintained its relevance and expanded its influence.

== Timeline ==
- 1984 – Founded May 11; first issue published.
- 1985 – William Marberry bought out; production moved fully to Dallas; Dennis Vercher hired as Editor.
- 1987 – Incorporated as Voice Publishing Company Inc.
- 1988 – Tammye Nash hired as reporter; offices moved to Wycliff Ave.
- 1989 – David Taffet and Tim Self joined staff.
- 1996 – Launched website DallasVoice.com.
- 1997 – Daniel Kusner hired as Life+Style Editor.
- 1998 – Don Ritz retires due to AIDS; Moore becomes publisher.
- 2001 – Robert Moore becomes sole owner after Ritz's death.
- 2004 – Acquired Texas Triangle and DFW Lambda Pages.
- 2006 – Dennis Vercher passes away; Tammye Nash appointed Senior Editor.
- 2009 – Print edition redesigned.
- 2013 – Ownership transition; Leo Cusimano becomes Publisher.
- 2014 – OUT North Texas magazine launched.
- 2017 – Leo Cusimano becomes sole owner.

=== Legacy ===
The newspaper's archives have been digitized and preserved by the University of North Texas Libraries, safeguarding the historical record of North Texas's LGBTQ+ community.

== Current operations ==
Today, Dallas Voice remains a vital outlet, publishing weekly in print and daily online, covering comprehensive news, politics, culture, and community events from its headquarters in the Dallas Design District.

== See also ==
- LGBT rights in Texas
- LGBT culture in Dallas-Fort Worth
- List of LGBT periodicals
