= Santa Monica Mirror =

Newspaper in Santa Monica, California

- Type: Weekly newspaper
- Format: Compact
- Owner: Mirror Media Group
- Publisher: Thomas Montemer
- Editor: Sam Catanzaro
- Founded: 1999
- Headquarters: 10680 W. Pico Blvde, Ste. 325; Los Angeles, California 90064; United States
- Website: smmirror.com

The Santa Monica Mirror is a weekly community newspaper which covers Santa Monica, California.

== History ==
The publication was founded by Michael Rosenthal, Peggy Clifford, Deborah Daly and Judy Swartz in 1999. When Rosenthal died in 2009, The Mirror was acquired by then editor-in-chief Thomas Montemer.

In August 2013, Mirror Media Group, publisher of the Santa Monica Mirror and parent company of Direct Community Video, acquired the biweekly business publication The Century City News and monthly community publication Brentwood News.

== See also ==
- The Pride LA
