= Walt Whitman Community School =

LGBT-oriented school in Dallas, Texas

Location
- Oak Lawn, Dallas, Texas; 32.8324°N 96.7048°W

Information
- School type: Private
- Established: 1997
- Status: Closed
- Closed: 2004

The Walt Whitman Community School (WWCS) was a private alternative school in Oak Lawn, Dallas, Texas that catered to youth who identified as LGBT. It opened in 1997 and closed in 2004.

It was the United States's first LGBT-oriented private school, and by 2003 it remained the country's only LGBT-oriented private school not in Manhattan or Los Angeles. It was co-founded by Becky Thompson and Pamala Stone. The former is lesbian, while the latter is straight. The school was named after Walt Whitman.

== History ==
The co-founders worked at the Walden Preparatory School in Addison. According to Thompson and Stone, anti-LGBT sentiments occurred at Walden. Whitman opened in 1997. Mary M. Clare and Steven E. James, the authors of the encyclopedia entry "Secondary Schools," wrote that it received media attention from around the world due to the "unique mission and its location in a southern city, considered nationally to represent conservative social values". When the school opened, its annual tuition was $7,000 ($14039.18 according to inflation) but financial assistance was given to all of the enrolled students. Financial assistance originated from the Walt Whitman Community School Foundation's fundraisers, including the GAYla prom, and other community and fundraising programs from the wider DFW LGBT community. The OutTakes film festival was one of the school's beneficiaries.

When the school first opened, it was unaccredited. As of November 1997 it was still unaccredited. At the time it was attempting to get accredited by the Southern Association of Colleges and Schools (SACS). The earliest the school would be accredited would be three years after its opening, but once accredited it would retroactively apply to the diplomas of all graduated students.

Towards the end of the school's life, financial support from other schools kept Whitman alive. Winfree Academy had offered its support to Whitman.

In 2003 the school's budget was under $150,000 ($262527.13 when adjusted for inflation). That year, MTV created the documentary episode School's Out: The Life of a Gay High School in Texas, a part of the True Life series. The school hoped that it would increase attention focused on it. The World of Wonder company had produced the film. It received a screening at the Lakewood Theater.

In 2004, prior to the beginning of the new school year, Winfree abruptly withdrew its support, causing Whitman to close.

== Campus ==
When it opened, the school occupied space in the Cathedral of Hope, the Dallas Metropolitan Community Church worship center in Oak Lawn, Dallas. The MCC did not charge rent. The school facility was the youth center, a five-room building; it had received renovations to serve as classroom space. By 2003, it had moved to rented space at the White Rock Community Church, located on Garland Road.

== Student body ==
The school originally had nine students, two of whom were in the 12th grade (seniors). The student body included white and ethnic minority students. Of the original nine students, four identified as gay. Two students identified as straight and had lesbian mothers. Two additional students identified as bisexual. One identified as transgender. The students had transferred from traditional public schools.

The total number of students increased to 14 at the end of the 1997–1998 school year. The school had an enrollment goal of 30 students but never met this goal. Its enrollment had steadily increased during the first five years of its life. In 2003 it had 16 students.

== See also ==
- LGBT culture in Dallas-Fort Worth
- EAGLES Academy
- Harvey Milk High School
