= The Patch (bar) =

LGBT bar in the US

The Patch was an LGBT bar formerly located at 610 W. Pacific Coast Highway in the Los Angeles neighborhood of Wilmington, California. The Patch, along with the Black Cat Tavern, played a pivotal role in the gay rights movement, when, in August 1968, it was one of the first sites where there was open resistance to the constant police harassment of gay establishments and meeting places in Southern California.

== History ==
The Patch was managed and owned by comedian Lee Glaze, who was known in the gay scene by his club name "The Blond Darling". The Patch had a clientele of gay men and women that included many women from the local roller derby circuit.

Glaze had been warned repeatedly by the police department (LAPD) that in order for him to stay open for business he must prohibit drag acts, groping, physical contact and male-male dancing, and not allow more than one person at a time in the restrooms.

Glaze initially tried to comply with police demands, but this caused his business to begin to fail. Glaze decided to covertly reject the police orders and would instead warn the patrons that under-cover police were in the bar by putting the song "GOD SAVE THE QUEEN" on the juke box. The patrons would know to comply with the police rules, until Glaze would indicate the coast was clear.

One weekend in August 1968, the bar was packed with gay men and women when vice squad officers burst in, followed by a phalanx of six LAPD officers, demanding IDs and making several arbitrary arrests. For Lee, that was several arrests too many.

Outraged, Glaze impulsively leapt on stage, grabbed the microphone and yelled "It's not against the law to be homosexual and it's not a crime to be in a gay bar!" That was the spark that changed yet another police raid into a political rally. Glaze called for the patrons to chant, "Fight for your rights" and "We are Americans too!" at the police. He told the crowd that he and The Patch management would underwrite the cost to bail anyone arrested out of jail and pay their attorney fees.

Glaze led the crowd to the flower shop up the street and he bought out all the flowers (excluding pansies) and gave them out to all the demonstrators before he led them on a 3:00am "flower power style" demonstration at the Harbor Division Police Station.

The officers behind the desk were caught off guard and called for reinforcements to fend off the growing crowd of gay demonstrators and thereby keep them outside until the men who had been arrested made bail and were released. The raids on The Patch and the Black Cat Tavern affected Rev. Troy Perry, a Gay Pentecostal Minister from rural Tennessee. Rev. Perry was present at the raid on The Patch with his boyfriend Tony Valdez. Tony was one of the men arrested and held in jail by the LAPD. Upon his release, after spending the night in jail, he said to Rev. Perry "God doesn't care about us." Rev. Perry's empathy for the inconsolable Valdez stirred him to the realization that he should form "a church for all of us who are outcasts".

In October 1968, Rev. Troy Perry formed the Metropolitan Community Church with the first congregation consisting of just twelve men and women gathered in his living room. The congregation today has grown to over 43,000 members.

Before Lee Glaze died in December 2013., he expressed his appreciation for the events that transpired in 1968 in a letter to the Advocate: "If all gay bars had customers such as mine, there would be no further harassment from various agencies such as the ABC the police, and the so-called 'straight' public. Throughout these problems their attitude has been 'We' re [sic] doing nothing wrong. We re [sic] hurting no one. There is nothing illegal about being in a gay bar. There is nothing Illegal about a bar being gay. And we're staying. Period.' These people have finally had it. They're standing up for their rights as individuals."
