= Black Cat Tavern =

LGBT historic site in Los Angeles, California

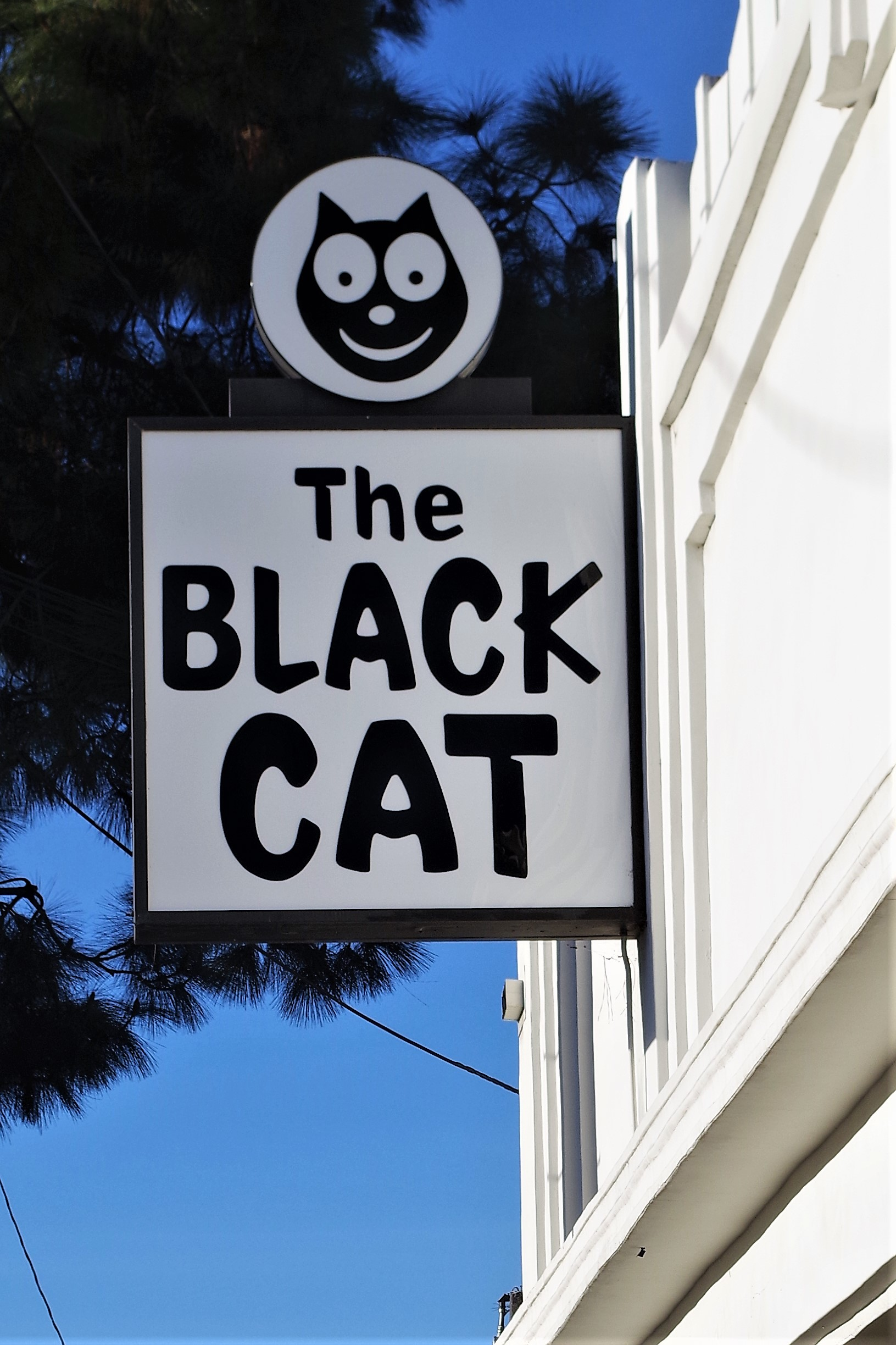

- Location within the Los Angeles metropolitan area
- 34°05′32″N 118°16′47″W
- Location: 3909 W Sunset Blvd

History
- Built: 1939

Site notes
- Architectural style: Art Deco
- Governing body: private

Los Angeles Historic-Cultural Monument
- Designated: 2008
- Reference no.: 939

The Black Cat Tavern is a historic gay bar located in the Silver Lake neighborhood of Los Angeles, California. In 1967, it was the site of one of the first demonstrations in the United States protesting police brutality against LGBT people, preceding the Stonewall riots by more than two years.

== History ==
The bar was established in November 1966, in a two-unit building shared with a laundromat and was known for a primarily blue-collar or working-class clientele.

On January 1, 1967, at the bar's New Year's Eve celebration, several plainclothes Los Angeles Police Department officers infiltrated the tavern.

According to local gay newspaper Tangents, "the Black Cat was happy and hopping" before undercover police arrived and started beating patrons as they were ringing in the New Year: "There were colored balloons covering the ceiling ... and three glittering Christmas trees." Moments later, "all hell broke loose." After arresting several patrons for kissing as they celebrated the occasion, the undercover police officers began beating several of the patrons and ultimately arrested fourteen patrons for "assault and public lewdness". Two bartenders were beaten unconscious. Two patrons fled to another gay bar, New Faces, but they were followed by police and arrested. The officers mistook the manager, a woman named Lee Roy, for a man (named "Leroy") wearing a dress, and beat her severely.

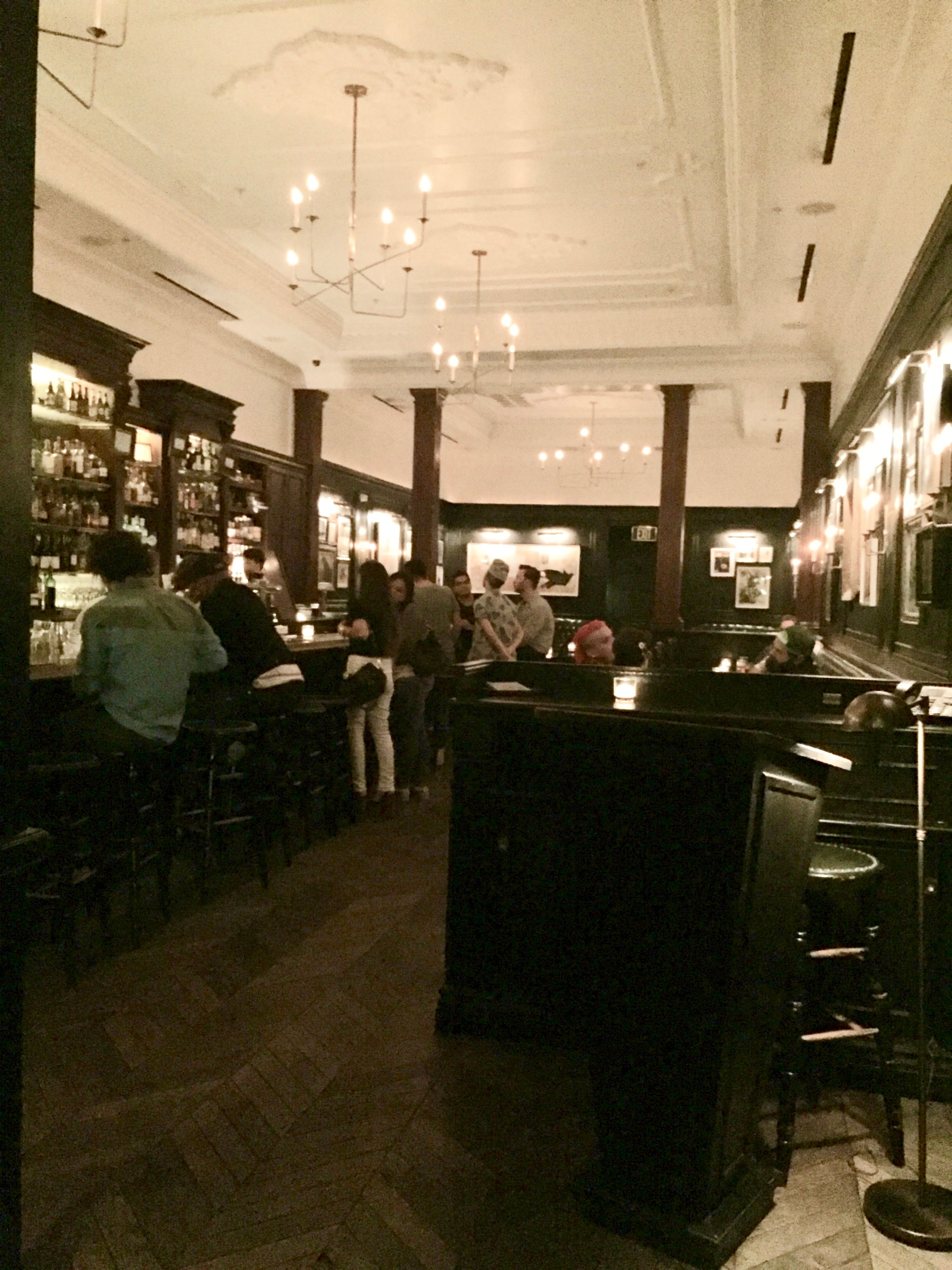
A look inside the Black Cat.

Contrary to popular myth, there was not a riot at the Black Cat, but a civil demonstration of 200 attendees to protest the raids was held on February 11, 1967. Demonstrators used "secret phone trees to organize the event" which led to hundreds of people demonstrating and coming to the event. The demonstration was organized by a group called PRIDE (Personal Rights in Defense and Education), founded by Steve Ginsberg, and the SCCRH (Southern California Council on Religion and Homophile). The protest was met by squadrons of armed policemen. Demonstrators carefully adhered to all laws and ordinances so that the police had no legitimate reasons to make arrests. The event was the first organized public LGBTQ protest in Los Angeles, and one of the earliest and largest in the country. This occurred during the governorship of Ronald Reagan, under which police brutality was systemic.

Two of the men arrested for kissing were later convicted under California Penal Code Section 647 and registered as sex offenders. The men appealed, asserting their right of equal protection under the law, but the U.S. Supreme Court did not accept their case. However, there were fundraising efforts that reached New York and San Francisco for the six convicted patrons, including Benny Baker and Charles Talley.

The Black Cat's entertainment and liquor licenses were suspended, and the business closed on May 21, 1967, after the state liquor board rejected its appeal.

== Legacy ==
The raid and subsequent protests inspired publication of The Advocate, which began as a newspaper for the group PRIDE. The January 1967 raid on the Black Cat Tavern and the August 1968 raid on The Patch together inspired the formation of the Metropolitan Community Church (led by Pastor Troy Perry).

For some time "the Stonewall riots became central to gay collective memory while other events did not." By pointing to critical moments in LGBT history that took place before 1969, historians continue to challenge the notion that the events at the Stonewall Inn marked the very first time LGBT folks "fought back instead of passively enduring humiliating treatment." Indeed, the 1959 Cooper Donuts Riot and the 1966 Compton's Cafeteria riot predate the incidents at The Black Cat.

On November 7, 2008, the Black Cat site was declared a Los Angeles Historic-Cultural Monument.

In 2014, queer Chicana artist Alma López and students in her "Queer Art in LA" class at UCLA painted a mural depicting the protests. The mural is located in the LGBTQ Studies offices in Haines Hall on the UCLA campus.

On November 14, 2017, the KCET documentary series Lost L.A. included interviews, footage, news coverage, and primary documents about the raid and protests in its episode "Coded Geographies", which situates the November 1966 incident and subsequent protests within the broader LGBTQ culture of Los Angeles. In 2017, a reenactment of the original protest took place on the 50th anniversary of the original protest. There were over one hundred participants, including LA mayor Eric Garcetti, and Alexei Ramanoff who was involved in the original organization of the 1967 protests. People brought signs that reproduced the original signs from the protest. The Black Cat Tavern has recently received state recognition as an official cultural history site.

== Present day ==
After the Black Cat's 1967 closure, the location operated as several other gay bars:

- The Bushwacker (1982)
- Tabasco's (1983–1984)
- Basgo's Disco (1984–1993)
- Le Barcito (1993–2011)

In November 2012 the site became a restaurant and bar named The Black Cat in memory of the earlier establishment. The new Black Cat caters to a general clientele, and there are photographs of the events of 1967 displayed inside. In 2008, the city of LA Cultural Heritage Commission installed a plaque on the building where the original Black Cat Tavern resided, recognizing it as the site of the first LGBTQ civil rights demonstration in the nation. In 2021, the ANSWER Coalition organized a march that started at the original Black Cat Tavern. The march advocated for an end to police brutality, racism, homophobia and transphobia and for gay rights. The Tavern was chosen for the starting point because it is widely considered to be the first site of protest for gay rights. On October 1, 2023, the Black Cat Tavern became California Historical Landmark #1063, with a marker designating it as such being unveiled, which made it the first marker for a California Historical Landmark associated with LGBTQ history.

In 2022, Shake Shack opened a location in the adjoining unit and placed three large signs on the historic duplex, dominating much of the Art Deco building with its branding. As photos of the new restaurant began circulating on social media, many voiced their frustration regarding the tension between queer communities and corporations. Silver Lake Neighborhood Councilmember Maebe A. Girl called the changes "a slap in the face", noting the company's links to anti-LGBT politicians. The Silver Lake Shake Shack location ultimately closed in 2024.

== See also ==
- List of LGBTQ bars
