= DTLA Proud =

Organization in Los Angeles, CA, US

- Genre: Pride festival
- Date: August
- Location: Los Angeles, California
- Inaugurated: 2016
- Organizer: DTLA Proud
- Website: www.dtlaproud.org

DTLA Proud is a 501(c)(3) non-profit organization based in and focused on Downtown Los Angeles.

== Community Center ==
On August 5, 2019, the DTLA Proud Gala raised funds for a new LGBTQ community center in Downtown. The proposed space would contain, when completed, a lounge area and library stocked with LGBTQ literature, an art gallery, and a non-profit incubator.

== Annual DTLA Proud Festival ==
The DTLA Proud Festival is held annually in Pershing Square.

=== DTLA Proud Festival 2016 ===
The inaugural DTLA Proud festival was held in August 2016.

=== DTLA Proud Festival 2017 ===
After attendance at the 2016 festival more than doubled the pre-event estimates, the organizers extended and enhanced the 2017 event with live music, DJs, dancers and a micro-waterpark. The 2017 event featured “The Run,” a 30-foot-long wall being created by the Los Angeles Conservancy and the ONE National Gay & Lesbian Archives, showcasing LGBTQ icons and listing notable sites in Los Angeles.

=== DTLA Proud Festival 2018 ===
2018's festival included a “Pride in the Sky” awards event at the OUE Skyspace at the U.S. Bank Tower

=== DTLA Proud Festival 2019 ===
To commemorate the fiftieth anniversary of the Stonewall riots, the 2019 DTLA Proud Festival included a memorial prepared by the ONE National Gay & Lesbian Archives.

=== DTLA Proud Festival 2020 ===
The COVID-19 pandemic forced the organization to cancel the 2020 DTLA Proud Festival.

=== DTLA Proud Festival 2021 ===
The DTLA Proud Festival was held in 2021 with COVID-19 precautions, such as requiring proof of vaccination.
