= Pershing Square (Los Angeles) =

Public square in Downtown Los Angeles

- Biddy Mason Park
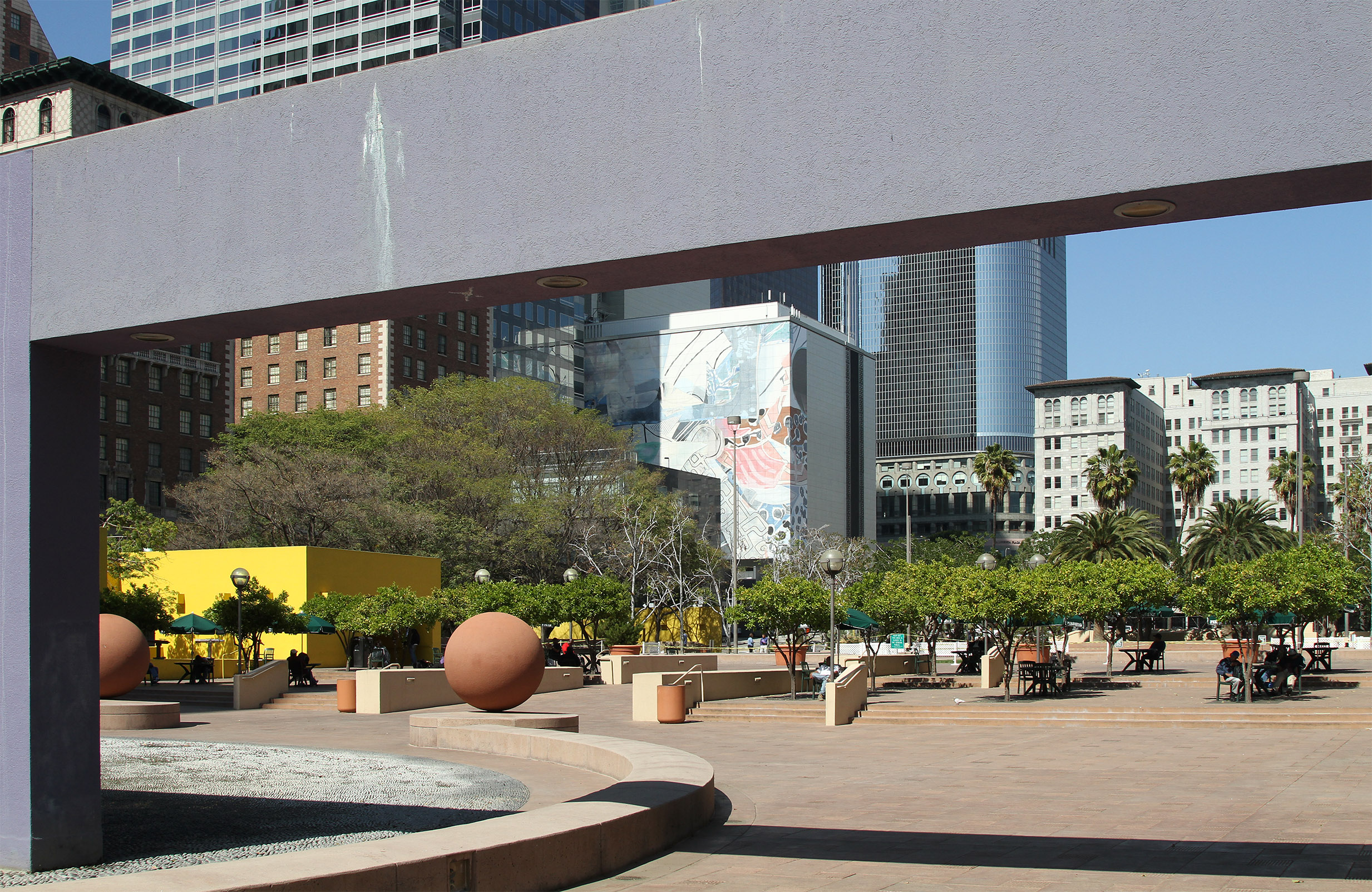
- Pershing Square, 2012
- Interactive map of Pershing Square
- Location: Downtown Los Angeles, California
- Coordinates: 34°02′54″N 118°15′11″W
- Area: 5-acre (20,000 m^{2})
- Created: 1866; 160 years ago
- Operator: City of Los Angeles
- Status: open
- Public transit: B Line D Line
- Website: recreation.parks.lacity.gov/pershingsquare/

Pershing Square is a small public park in Downtown Los Angeles, California, one square block in size, bounded by 5th Street to the north, 6th Street to the south, Hill Street to the east, and Olive Street to the west. Originally dedicated in 1866 by Mayor Cristóbal Aguilar as La Plaza Abaja, the square has had numerous names over the years; it was dedicated in honor of General John J. Pershing in 1918.

In 2024, it was first proposed that the park be renamed Biddy Mason Park, after an early Los Angeles resident, former slave and entrepreneur Biddy Mason, which the LA City Council approved in 2026.

== History ==
=== 19th century ===
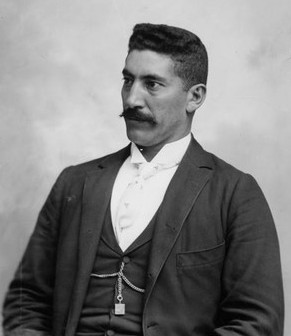
The square was dedicated in 1866 by Mayor Cristóbal Aguilar as "La Plaza Abaja".

In the 1850s, the location was used as a camp by settlers from outside the Pueblo de Los Angeles, which lay to the northeast around the Our Lady Queen of the Angels' church, the Los Angeles Plaza, and present-day Olvera Street. Surveyors drew the site as 10 individual plots of land, but in practicality it was a single 5-acre (20,000 m^{2}) parcel. A waterway called Arroyo de Los Reyes ran through what is now the square. Canals distributing water from the Zanja Madre were adjacent. In 1866 the site was dedicated as a public square by Mayor Cristobal Aguilar; it was called La Plaza Abaja (Spanish for "the lower plaza")." At some point the owner of a nearby beergarden, German immigrant George "Roundhouse" Lehman, planted small native Monterey cypress trees, fruit trees, and flowering shrubs in the park and maintained them until his death in 1882.

In 1867, St. Vincent's College, present-day Loyola Marymount University, was situated across the street, and so the park informally became known as St. Vincent's Park. In 1870, it was officially named Los Angeles Park. In 1886 it was renamed 6th Street Park, and it redesigned with an "official park plan" by Frederick Eaton. In the early 1890s it was renamed Central Park. During this period a bandstand pavilion was added for concerts and orators. The plantings became sub-tropically lush, and the park became a shady oasis and an outdoor destination. In 1894 the park was used as the staging area for the annual crowning of the queen of La Fiesta de Los Angeles.

=== Early 20th century ===
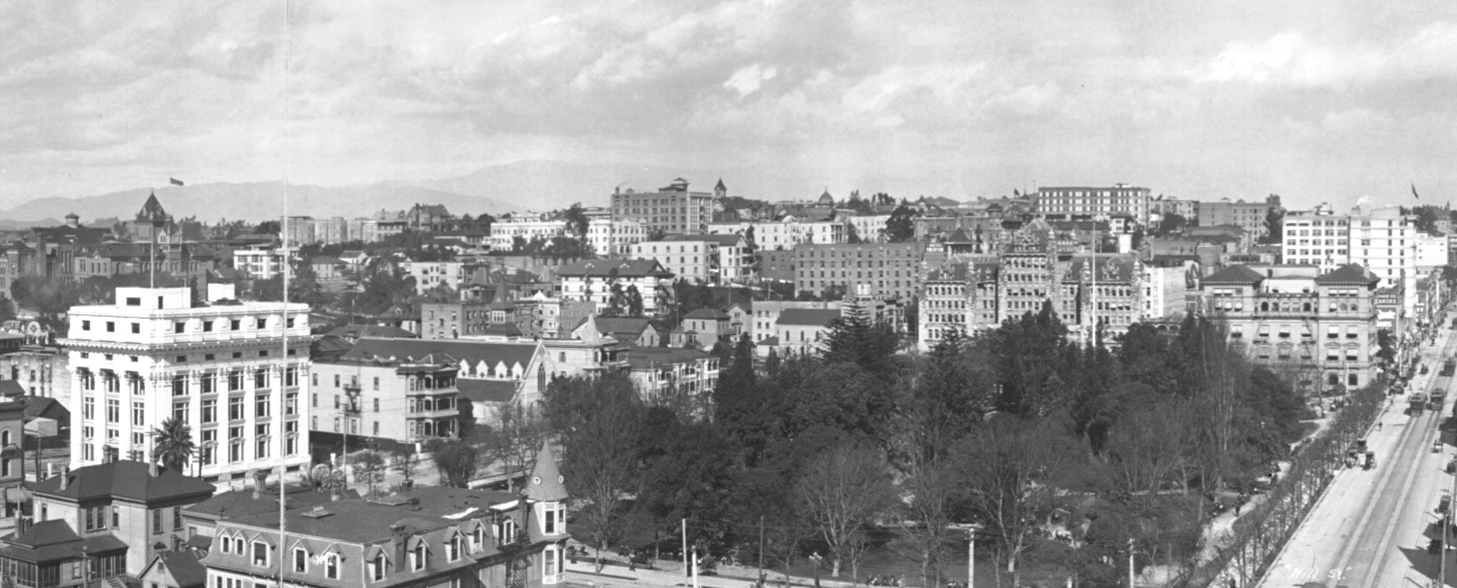
Central Park, looking north, around 1909

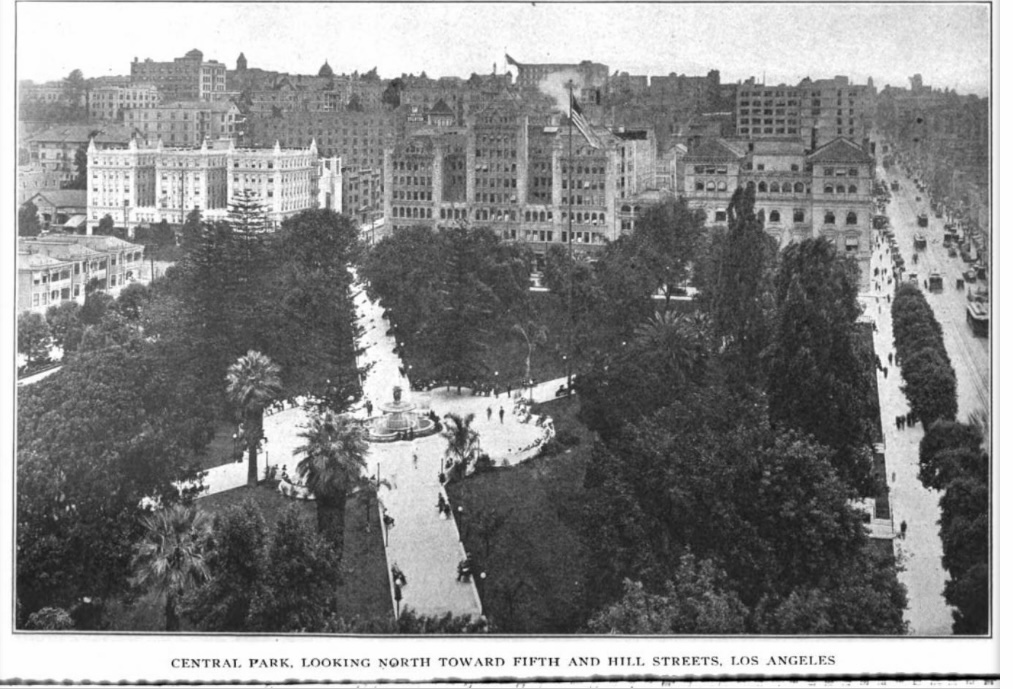
Central Park looking north toward Fifth and Hill, 1915

A monument to California's twenty Spanish–American War dead was erected in 1900; it is said to be modeled after a Spanish–American War veteran, 7th California Infantry volunteer Charlie Hammond of San Francisco, and it is believed to be the oldest work of public art in Los Angeles. The Los Angeles City Council declared it a historic-cultural monument in 1990.

In 1910 the park was renovated under a design by John Parkinson, who later designed Los Angeles City Hall and Union Station. Parkinson's design featured a three-tier fountain sculpted by Johan Caspar Lachne Gruenfeld, braced by four life-size concrete cherubs supporting a vase of cascading water. In November 1918, a week after Armistice Day ended World War I, the park was renamed Pershing Square, in honor of Gen. John J. Pershing. A plaque was added in his honor some four decades later.

In the 1920s and 1930s tropical plants were added to the park. The increase in foliage led to Pershing Square becoming a cruising location, with the square anchoring what became known as "The Run," an area home to several gay-friendly establishments. In 1924, a life-size bronze of a World War I doughboy, sculpted by Humberton Pedretti, was unveiled, flanked by old cannons. In 1935, a bronze cannon from the USS Constitution was added.

In 1932, a statue of Ludwig van Beethoven was added to honor William Andrews Clark, Jr., founder of the Los Angeles Philharmonic. "His statue faces the former Philharmonic Auditorium across Fifth Street, which reverted to church use after the new Music Center opened."

=== Later 20th century ===
The park was in heavy use during World War II for rallies and recruitment. After the war, the park began to decline as commercial decentralization and suburbanization took hold in the Greater Los Angeles area, and Downtown saw lesser importance and intensity of use.

Many of the palm trees that were excavated in the 1950s were sent to be used in the Disneyland Jungle Cruise ride.

The entire park was demolished and excavated in 1952 to build a three-level underground parking garage. Atop the garage, concrete was covered by a layer of soil with a broad expanse of lawn. Entry and exit ramps cut the square off from the sidewalks around it. In 1954, Kelly Roth, a Hungarian immigrant who had owned a cigar store across from the square, donated $30,000 for a water feature, twin reflecting pools in honor of his late wife and to thank Los Angeles for the opportunities that the city provided him. The Roth fountains were designed by architect Stiles O. Clements.

The park continued to be neglected for safe uses. Its problems were noted during the 1960 Democratic National Convention, as nominee and future president John F. Kennedy was headquartered at the Biltmore Hotel facing the park. By the 1984 Summer Olympics the park had become a serious eyesore, leading the city to spend $1 million for a temporary renovation.

In 1992, the park was closed for a major $14.5-million redesign and renovation by Mexican architect and landscape architect Ricardo Legorreta and U.S. landscape architect Laurie Olin. The redesigned park opened in 1994 with a 10-story purple bell tower, fountains, and a walkway representing an earthquake fault line (by artist Barbara McCarren), concert stage, and perimeter seating. Pavement covered almost the entire block, with copses of trees placed in raised planters. In 1994, the park was featured in a Visiting... with Huell Howser episode.

=== 21st century ===
In 2000, a monument was installed to honor local veteran Eugene A. Obregon.

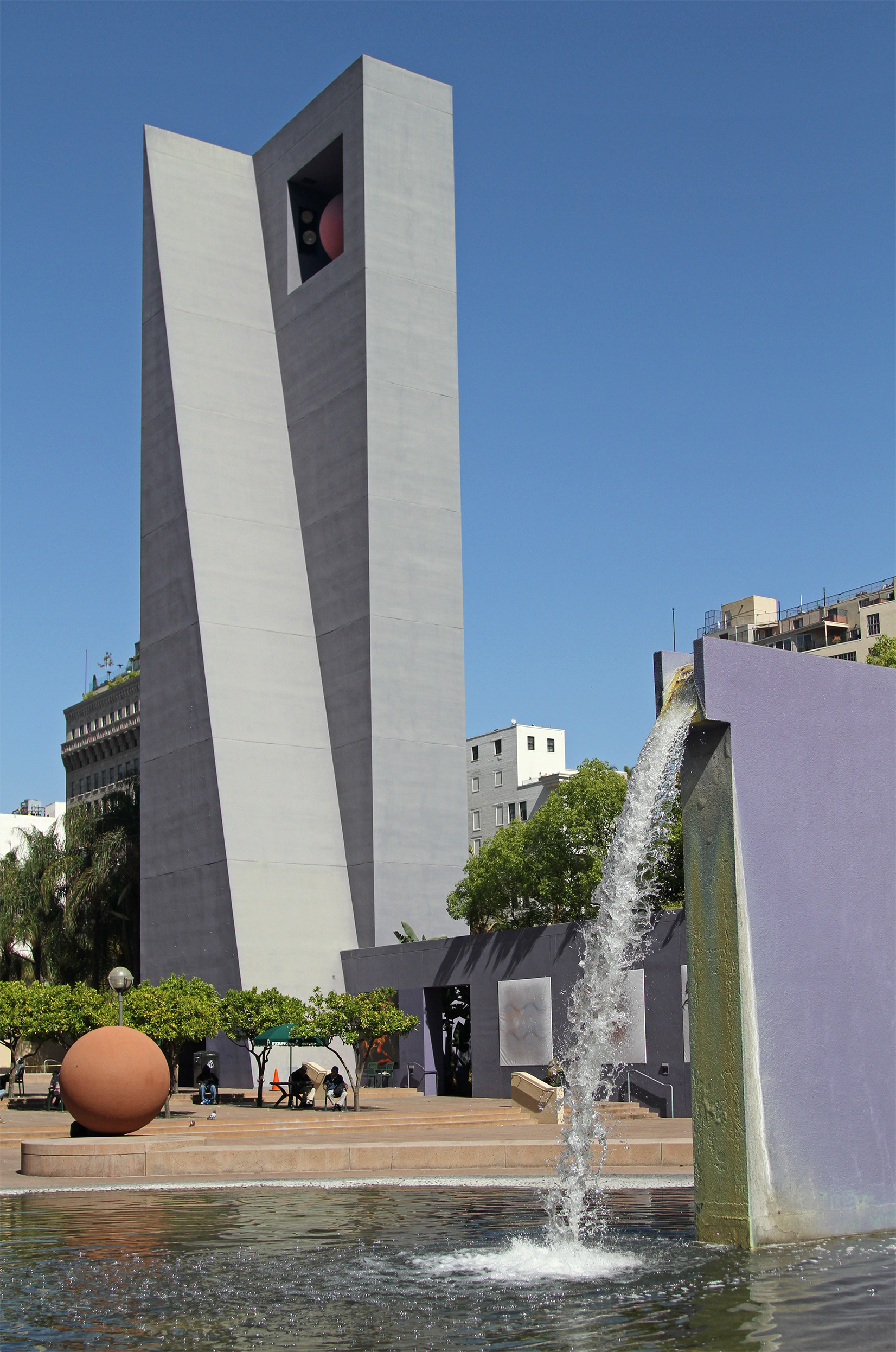
The current park, designed by Ricardo Legorreta in 1992, with the fountain and bell tower

The park regularly hosts seasonal events such as a temporary Ice rink in the winter and DTLA Proud Festival and live concert performances in the summer.

In 2023, a three phase renovation and construction kicked off to be completed by the 2028 Summer Olympics. Phase one includes new glass elevators to the underground parking garage and new landscaping on the western side of the plaza. Phase 1b will address the interior knoll. Phase two and three will remove the garage ramps and improve access to the plaza, removing pavement walls and installing shade trees. Renovation design was completed by Agence Ter and Salt Landscape Architects. The total cost is estimated at $110 million.

In June 2024, Los Angeles City Councilmember Kevin de León introduced a motion to rename the park "Biddy Mason Park" after Biddy Mason, a formerly enslaved woman who became a local prominent nurse, real estate entrepreneur, philanthropist, and founder of the First African Methodist Episcopal Church of Los Angeles. The motion stalled in committee, but would later be reintroduced by de León's successor, Ysabel Jurado, in August 2026. The city council unanimously approved the motion in September 2026.

== Public art ==
Permanent and temporary public art has been placed in the park since 1900, beginning with Los Angeles' oldest public art sculpture, the Spanish American War Memorial.

- Spanish–American War Memorial (1900)
- The Doughboy (1924)
- Statue of Ludwig van Beethoven (1932)
- Neons for Pershing Square (1993), transit station art below the park
- Liquid Shard (temporary installation, August 2016)

== Transit ==
The area is served by the Pershing Square station of the Metro B and D lines.

== In popular culture ==
The 2001 video game Tony Hawk's Pro Skater 3 features a level based on Los Angeles, including a representation of Pershing Square.

The 2004 video game Grand Theft Auto San Andreas features Pershing Square, also called Pershing Square in the game.

The 2013 video game Grand Theft Auto V features Legion Square, which is based on Pershing Square.

== See also ==
- List of parks in Los Angeles

=== Further reading ===
- Chester Himes (1942). "Lunching at the Ritzmore", The Collected Stories of Chester Himes, Da Capo Press. (Set in Pershing Square.)
