= The Pride LA =

- Type: Bi-weekly LGBT newspaper
- Format: Tabloid
- Founded: 2015; 11 years ago
- Language: English
- Headquarters: Los Angeles, United States
- Circulation: 15,000
- Website: thepridela.com

The Pride LA is an LGBTQ newspaper launched in 2015.

== History ==
In 2015, publisher and journalist Troy Masters launched The Pride LA as part of the Mirror Media Group, which publishes the Santa Monica Mirror and other Los Angeles Westside community newspapers.

== See also ==
- Santa Monica Mirror
