= Dirty Looks (non-profit) =

Queer film, video and performance collective

Dirty Looks is a nonprofit collective for queer film, video and performance that launched in 2011. Dirty Looks has used film and time-based art to illuminate queer histories and liminal spaces across Los Angeles and New York City. Sites of screenings include The Museum of Modern Art, The Kitchen, The Hammer, MOMA, ONE Archives, Artists Space, the Egyptian Theatre, Downtown Independent, REDCAT, Echo Park Film Center and Judson Memorial Church. Dirty Looks began regular Los Angeles programming in January 2015. Bradford Nordeen is the founder and creative director.
