= List of public art in Los Angeles =

This is a list of public art in Los Angeles. This list applies only to works of public art accessible in an outdoor public space. For example, this does not include artwork visible inside a museum.

Most of the works mentioned are sculptures. When this is not the case (i.e. sound installation, for example) it is stated next to the title.

== Downtown Los Angeles ==
Title	Image	Artist	Year	Location	Coordinates	Material	Dimensions	Owner
Abraham Lincoln		Robert Merrell Gage	1955	Grand Park, (Grand & 1st St)	34°03′20.8″N 118°14′54.1″W	Bronze	Bust	City of LA
Equestrian statue of Antonio Aguilar		Dan Medina	September 16, 2012	Olvera St, (Alameda & Los Angeles St)	34°03′24.2″N 118°14′15.9″W	Bronze	13 ft on a 5 ft fountain base.	Commissioned by State of Zacatecas, Mexico. Owned by City of LA.
Aquarius (sculpture)		Jerome Kirk	February 26, 1970	Union Bank Plaza, (445 S. Figueroa)	34°3′12.4″N 118°15′23.9″W	Stainless Steel	18 ft on a concrete base	Commissioned by the Community Redevelopment Agency's One Percent for the Arts, Art in Public Places Program. Funded by Connecticut General Life Insurance Company, owner of Union Bank Square.
Armenian Genocide Memorial LA		Unknown Artist	April 24, 2015	Grand Park	34°03′18.0″N 118°14′41.7″W	Bronze Plaque next to a memorial pomegranate tree.	2 ft	Commissioned by Armenian American Community of LA. 100 other trees planted throughout City of LA.
Beethoven		Arnold Foerster	1932	Pershing Square	34°02′54.8″N 118°15′09.0″W	Bronze	7 ft on 4 ft pedestal	Commissioned by La Philharmonic staff for its founder William Andrews Clark Jr.
Bracero Monument		Dan Medina	September 29, 2019	Olvera Street	34°03′29.6″N 118°14′24.2″W	Bronze	13 ft	Commissioned by LA Dept. of Cultural Affairs.
Statue of Bruce Lee		Unknown Artist	June 15, 2013	Chinatown	34°03′54.39″N 118°14′14.74″W	Bronze	7 ft	Commissioned by the Lee Family, a California Native and visitor to LA's Chinatown.
King Carlos III		Federico Coullaut-Valera	1976	Olvera Street	34°03′22.9″N 118°14′19.0″W	Bronze	10 ft.	Commissioned by the Spanish Consulte of Los Angeles for the US Bicentennial. Owned by the City of LA
Chinatown Tai Chi		Unknown Artist	2017	Chinatown	34°03′50.5″N 118°14′10.1″W	Stone with Fountain	4 ft	
Chinatown Gateway Monument		Ruppert Mok	2001	Chinatown	34°03′32.1″N 118°14′24.1″W	Bronze	7 ft	Commissioned by Chinese American Community.
Chiune Sugihara Memorial Statue		Ramon G. Velazco	2002	Little Tokyo	34°02′52.5″N 118°14′21.0″W	Bronze	4 ft sitting man statue.	City of Los Angeles Cultural Affairs
Court of Historic American Flags			2013	Grand ParkDepart	34°03′18.0″N 118°14′41.7″W	Flag Poles and Plaques	19 20 ft poles and flags	LA County
Cross at Olvera Street		Jackie Hadnot	Original 1930, replacement 2017	Olvera Street	34°03′24.8″N 118°14′18.5″W	Wood	7'6 ft tall	Commissioned by La Plaza Historical Society.
Colpo D'Ala		Arnaldo Pomodoro	Dedicated December 12, 1988	Grand Park, (DWP Fountain)	34°03′27.5″N 118°14′59.5″W	Bronze		Commissioned by Government of Italy for the City of LA. Celebrating the 40 yr anniversary of the Marshall Plan.
Double Ascension		Herbert Bayer	Dedicated January 20, 1973	Bunker Hill, City National Plaza	34°03′03.9″N 118°15′25.7″W	Sculpture: steel, painted; Basin: stone.	6.1 m (20 ft); 9.1 m diameter (30 ft)	Atlantic Richfield Company, Los Angeles, California CA001163
Salmon Run (sculpture)		Christopher Keene (sculptor)	Dedicated: 1982	Bunker Hill, Manulife Plaza		Sculpture:	8-foot by 8-foot by 6-foot cast bronze sculpture, on 8-foot black marble base	Manulife Plaza
The Doughboy		Humberto Pendretti	1924	Pershing Square	34°02′54.6″N 118°15′09.0″W	Bronze	8 ft on 12 ft pedestal	World War 1 Doughboy Memorial.
Evelia de Pie		Francisco Zúñiga	1978	USC	34°01′21.0″N 118°17′08.0″W	Bronze	7 ft	Gift to USC from Dorothy Meisel
Felipe de Neve		Henry Lion	Dedicated 1932	Olvera Street	34°03′23.9″N 118°14′20.0″W	Bronze	7'6	Commissioned by Parlor 247 Native Daughters of the Golden West. Owned by City of LA.
Fort Moore Pioneer Memorial		Adachi	July 3, 1957	Olvera Street	34°03′30.3″N 118°14′30.9″W	Terra Cota relief	78 x 45 ft tall	City of LA.
Four Arches		Alexander Calder	1973	Bank of America Plaza (Los Angeles)	34°3′11.7″N 118°15′11.8″W	Steel	63 x 10 ft tall	Bank of America Corp. Art Collection
Frank Putnam Flint Fountain		Julia Bracken Wendt & Henry S. Makcay	September 13, 1933	Los Angeles City Hall South Lawn	34°3′10.3″N 118°14′36.8″W	Bronze and Marble	15 x 21 ft tall	City of LA.
George Washington		Jean-Antoine Houdon	February 22, 1933	Grand Park	34°03′21.8″N 118°14′44.8″W	Bronze	7'6	Commissioned by Los Angeles Women's Community Service. Owned by City of LA.
Hammering Man		Jonathan Borofsky	1988	South Park	34°02′27.4″N 118°15′18.1″W	Painted Cor-Ten steel, motor.	22 ft. x 8 ft. x 2 in.	California Mart, Facilities/Property Management, Los Angeles, California CA001164
Homage to Cabrillo: Venetian Quadrant		Eugene Sturman	1985	South Park	34°02′47.1″N 118°15′44.4″W	Steel.		Corner of Figueroa and 11th.
Intermittent Constancy		Paul Chilkov	2015	Bunker Hill (adjacent Broad Museum).	34°03′13.4″N 118°15′03.3″W	Aluminum	27 ft	The Emmerson Apartment Tower
The Immigrants (sculpture)		Alberto Biasi	1971	Chinatown	34°04′5.9″N 118°14′6.2″W	Concrete and Steel	14 x 30 ft	St. Peters Italian Catholic Church
Statue of Junípero Serra		Ettore Cadorin	February 22, 1933	Olvera Street	34°03′22.32″N 118°14′17.88″W	Bronze	8' 9" × 2' 2" × 2' 4"	Removed (toppled) in 2020.
Los Angeles Kings Monument		Itamar Amrany, Julie Rotblatt Amrany and Omri Amrany	2016	Staples Center forecourt	34°02′37.8″N 118°16′4.1″W	bronze, granite and glass		LA Kings 50th anniversary commemoration.
Los Angeles Pobladores Memorial Plaque		Unknown Artist	1981	Olvera Street	34°03′24.8″N 118°14′18.5″W	Bronze	1 ft round plaque embedded on cement	Commissioned by La Plaza Historical Society.
The Law Givers		Albert Stewart	1960	Grand Park	34°03′22.6″N 118°14′45.3″W	Glazed Terracota	7'6	Twin mounted sculptures of "Mosaic Law" and "Declaration of Independence" represented by Moses and Thomas Jefferson.
A Rose for Lilly		Frank Gehry	2003	Grand Park, Walt Disney Concert Hall	34°03′20.2″N 118°15′00.7″W	Royal Delft Blue porcelain	22 ft wide by 7 ft tall	Frank Gehry tribute to Lillian Disney.
Peace on Earth		Jacques Lipchitz	1969	Grand Park, Los Angeles Music Center	34°03′26.1″N 118°14′53.9″W	Bronze	29 ft	
Space Shuttle Challenger Memorial		Isao Hirai	1990	Little Tokyo	34°03′00.2″N 118°14′31.0″W	Plastic and Metal	18 ft. a 1/10th scale model on a seven ft. pedestal.	Commission by Little Tokyo residents and Merchants to honor Challenger crew, specifically Japanese-American Astronaut on board Ellison S. Onizuka.
Spanish–American War Memorial		S. M. Goddard and Kilpatrick	1900	Pershing Square	34°02′54.4″N 118°15′09.3″W	Granite	6 ft on 6 ft pedestal	Oldest known monument memorial in Los Angeles.
Sun Yat-sen		Unknown Artist	1961	Chinatown	34°03′55.3″N 118°14′13.5″W	Bronze	6 by 4 ft	Commissioned by the Chinese Consolidated Benevolent Association.
Triforium		Joseph Young	Commissioned 1972. 1975.	Civic Center (Los Ángeles Mall)	34°03′14.6″N 118°14′28.0″W	Reinforced concrete, glass and painted steel. Electronically programmed music and light show.	60x by 20 ft.	Administered by City of Los Angeles, Cultural Affairs Department, Public Art Division, Los Angeles, California CA000450
Remembrance of Genocide in the Ukraine				Grand Park	34°03′18.0″N 118°14′41.7″W	Bronze Plaque	3 ft	Commissioned by Ukraine American Community of LA.
Vietnam Memorial of LA County		Frank Ackerman	1973	Grand Park	34°03′18.3″N 118°14′41.2″W	Bronze	6 ft	LA County

== Central Los Angeles ==
Title	Image	Artist	Year	Location	Coordinates	Material	Dimensions	Owner
The 9/11 Memorial				Elysian Park (Frank Hotchkin Memorial Training Center)	34°04′08.8″N 118°14′35.5″W	23 ton Steel trident.		Largest remnant of the destroyed World Trade Center outside New York City. LAFD
A. W. Ross		Unknown Artist		Mid-Wilshire (Miracle Mile)	34°03′45.5″N 118°21′17.0″W	Bronze	5 ft	Promoter and founder of miracle Mile business district.
Berlin Bear		Renee Sintenis	1976	Los Feliz (Griffith Park)	34°06′30.0″N 118°18′27.5″W	Bronze	5 ft	A Gift from the City of Berlin to sister City of LA.
Berlin Wall Segments Marker			2009	Mid-Wilshire (Miracle Mile)	34°03′44.8″N 118°21′30.8″W	cement	11.8 ft	Largest original Berlin Wall outside of Berlin. Owned by Wende Museum
Cinema Infinite		Michael James Culhane	2004	Hollywood (Highland Ave & Fountain Ave)	34°05′40.2″N 118°20′19.8″W	metal	8 ft	
The Flight of Europa		Paul Manship	Modeled 1930. Cast 1931.	Hollywood (Sunset & Vine)	34°05′53.5″N 118°19′35.3″W	Bronze	12'5 on a fountain base	Chase Bank
Hollywood Sign		Thomas Fisk Goff	1923	Hollywood (Mount Lee)	34°08′02.4″N 118°19′17.6″W	Steel	45 ft tall, 350 ft long	Originally created as temporary advertisement for a local real estate development. Hollywood Chamber of Commerce, owned by the City of Los Angeles.
Four Ladies of Hollywood		Catherine Hardwicke	1993	Hollywood (Hollywood Blvd. & La Brea)	34°06′05.2″N 118°20′42.1″W	Stainless Steel	14 ft	
Griffith J. Griffith		Jonathan Bickart	1996	Los Feliz (Griffith Park)	34°07′04.0″N 118°16′19.1″W	Bronze	7 ft	Griffith Trust to the City of Los Angeles.
Haym Solomon Statue		Robert Paine	1944	Fairfax (Pan Pacific Park)	34°04′14″N 118°21′12″W	Bronze	12 ft	Originally erected at Hollenbeck Park in 1943, Moved to Pan Pacific Park in 2008. Commissioned by the Jewish American community of Los Angeles.
John Wayne Equestrian Statue		Harry Jackson	1984	Beverly Hills (Wilshire & Hamilton Dr.)	34°03′53.2″N 118°22′31.4″W	Bronze	14 ft	Commissioned by Great Western Savings and Loan Bank. Owned by Beverly Hills City.
Bust of James Dean		Kenneth Kendall	1988	Hollywood Hills (Griffith Park Observatory)	34°07′08″N 118°18′03″W	Bronze	1 ft bust on a 5 ft pedestal.	Commissioned by Dean himself. Presented to Griffith Park by artist.
Bust of Jose de San Martin		Fernando Di Zitti	2001	Beverly Grove (Le Doux Rd & Burton Way)	34°04′19″N 118°22′38″W	Stone Tablet with Bronze Bust	6 ft.	Commissioned by Consulate of Argentina in Los Angeles.
Kermit the Frog Statue		Ed Eyth, Jim Mahon, Janis Beauchamp, Maria Jimenez, Craig Shepherd, Dave Conner & Barbara Grill	2000	Hollywood (Jim Henson Company Lot)	34°05′48.2″N 118°20′38.3″W		12 ft statue on a 10 ft building.	Commissioned by Brian & Lisa Henson, Jim Henson's children.
The Muse Of Music Dance And Drama		George Stanley	1940	Hollywood (Hollywood Bowl Entrance)	34°06′42.2″N 118°20′11.0″W	Art, Sculpture and Bas Relief	15 ft statues	Public Works of Art Project
Hollywood Satellite		Michael James Culhane	2005	Hollywood (Highland Avenue & Fountain Avenue)	34°05′40.2″N 118°20′18.4″W	metal	25 ft	
Leif Erickson Bust			1936	Los Feliz (Griffith Park)	34°06′29.5″N 118°18′29.7″W	Bronze	1 ft bust on a 5 ft pedestal	Icelandic Community (Nordic Civic League)to the City of LA.
Levitated Mass		Michael Heizer	2012	Mid-Wilshire (Miracle Mile)	34°03′52.0″N 118°21′35.6″W	Large granite stone		LACMA
Bust of Juan de Anza		Henry Lion	1927	Carthay Square (San Vicente Blvd & McCarthy Vista)	34°06′40.8″N 118°36′02.1″W	Bronze Bust on a Granite plinth	5 ft	Sons of the Golden West and Los Angeles Historical Society; Former site of Carthay Circle Theatre.
Miner's Statue: Daniel O. McCarthy Pioneer Fountain		Henry Lion	1925	Carthay Square (San Vicente Blvd & McCarthy Vista)	34°03′40.8″N 118°22′02.1″W	Bronze	7 ft	City of LA, Former site of Carthay Circle Theatre.
Queen of the Angels (Nuestra Reina de Los Angeles)		Ada Mae Sharpless	1935	Echo Park (Echo Park)	34°04′27.5″N 118°15′38.8″W	Concrete	14 ft	Commissioned by DPWP (Public Works)
Statue of Harrison Gray Otis		Paul Troubetzkoy	1920	Westlake (MacArthur Park	34°03′33.9″N 118°16′44.9″W	Bronze	14 ft	City of LA
Statue of Óscar Romero		Joaquin Serrano	2013	Westlake (MacArthur Park	34°3′25.9″N 118°16′36.1″W	Bronze	6.5 ft	City of LA
Hungarian Liberation Statue			1969	Westlake (MacArthur Park	34°03′38″N 118°16′41″W	Obelisk with bronze eagle and plaque.	60 ft	1969 Hungarian Freedom Fighters Federation
Prometheus Bringing Fire to Earth		Nína Sæmundsson	1935	Westlake (MacArthur Park	34°03′29″N 118°16′35″W	Cast Stone	12 ft	
Psychogeographies		Dustin Yellin	2015	Hollywood (Columbia Square)	34°05′53.6″N 118°19′23.1″W	Glass Sculpture		
Spirit of Los Angeles		Delesprie	2001	The Grove at Farmers Market	34°04′19.8″N 118°21′30.3″W	Bronze	32 ft tall	Commissioned by Rick Caruso
Rocky and Bullwinkle		Bill Oberlin	1961	West Hollywood (Sunset Strip)	34°05′26.6″N 118°22′58.7″W	Plaster, Metal and Paint	12 ft.	Donated by the Ward Family for City of West Hollywood's Urban Art Collection
The Sal Guarriello Veterans Memorial		Campbell and Campbell Architects	1993	West Hollywood	34°05′26″N 118°22′29″W	Concrete		Park w/ fountain, flag poles and five stone "shields", representing each branch of the military.
Unconscious		Franz West	2010	Beverly Hills (Wilshire & N. Beverly Dr.)	34°04′02.1″N 118°23′58.2″W	Aluminum	18 ft	
Urban Light		Chris Burden	2008	Mid-Wilshire (Miracle Mile)	34°03′46.9″N 118°21′33.1″W	Refurbished metal city light poles	Various heights	Purchased from artist by LACMA.

== East Los Angeles & Northeast Los Angeles ==
Title	Image	Artist	Year	Location	Coordinates	Material	Dimensions	Owner
Agustin Lara		Humberto Peraza	1984	Lincoln Heights (Lincoln Park)	34°03′57.1″N 118°12′26.1″W	Bronze	6 ft statue on a 5 ft pedestal	City of LA.
Bell of Dolores		Unknown Artist	1978	Lincoln Heights (Lincoln Park)	34°03′55.8″N 118°12′21.8″W	Bronze	3 ft Bell on a 12 ft Arch	City of LA.
Benito Juarez Monument		Unknown Artist	1976	Lincoln Heights (Lincoln Park)	34°03′56.3″N 118°12′21.5″W	Bronze	4 ft statue on a 5 ft pedestal	Commissioned as a gift to the City of LA by Mexican President Jose Lopez Portillo.
Emperor Cuauhtémoc		Unknown Artist	1981	Lincoln Heights (Lincoln Park)	34°03′57.7″N 118°12′28.5″W	Stone	13 ft	City of LA.
Emiliano Zapata Equestrian Statue		Ignacio Asunsolo	1980	Lincoln Heights (Lincoln Park)	34°03′55.2″N 118°12′26.1″W	Bronze	15 ft	A gift to City of LA from sister city, the City of Mexico.
Faces of Elysian Valley		Freya Bardell & Brian Howe	1984	Elysian Park (Roundabout)	34°04′53.5″N 118°13′32.8″W	Granite	8 ft x 12 ft high	City of LA.
Florence Nightingale		Peter David Edstrom	1936	Lincoln Heights (Lincoln Park)	34°03′57.1″N 118°12′05.8″W	Cast Stone	10 ft	City of LA.
Guadalupe Victoria Bust		Unknown Artist	1997	Lincoln Heights (Lincoln Park)	34°03′56.1″N 118°12′22.0″W	Bronze	2 ft bust on a 4 ft pedestal	A gift from the Mexican state of Durango to the city of Los Angeles.
Equestrian statue of José María Morelos		Julian Martinez	1980	Lincoln Heights (Lincoln Park)	34°03′55.8″N 118°12′21.8″W	Bronze	15 ft	City of LA.
Dona Josefa Ortiz de Dominguez Bust		Velarco	1996	Lincoln Heights (Lincoln Park)	34°03′56.0″N 118°12′22.0″W	Bronze	2 ft bust on a 4 ft pedestal	
Ignacio Zaragosa Bust		Francisco Zúñiga	1981	Lincoln Heights (Lincoln Park)	34°03′56.5″N 118°12′21.4″W	Bronze	2 ft bust on a 4 ft pedestal	Commissioned as a gift to the City of LA by the Mexican Secretary of Defense Felix Galvan Lopez.
Jesus Gonzalez Ortega Bust		Ayda	1987	Lincoln Heights (Lincoln Park)	34°03′56.6″N 118°12′21.6″W	Bronze	2 ft bust on a 4 ft pedestal	Commissioned as a gift to the City of LA by the Mexican state of Zacatecas.
Bust of Lázaro Cárdenas		Ernesto E. Tamariz	1989	Lincoln Heights (Lincoln Park)	34°03′56.5″N 118°12′22.2″W	Bronze	2 ft bust on a 4 ft pedestal	
Lincoln the Lawyer		Julia Bracken Wendt	1925	Lincoln Heights (Lincoln Park)	34°03′57.6″N 118°12′18.8″W	Bronze	4 ft statue on a 5 ft pedestal	City of LA.
Statue of Lucha Reyes		unknown artist	2009	Boyle Heights (Mariachi Plaza)	34°02′51.2″N 118°13′10.6″W	Bronze	8 ft	City of LA.
Mexican American All Wars Memorial		Unknown Artist	1947	Boyle Heights (Cesar Chavez Avenue & Indiana Street)(Cinco Puntos)	34°02′25.0″N 118°11′33.5″W	Bronze	Cement Plinth	Commissioned by the Mexican American residents. City of LA.
El Cura Don Miguel Hidalgo Y Costilla		Efren de los Rios	1938	Lincoln Heights (Lincoln Park)	34°03′56.3″N 118°12′22.2″W	Bronze	8 ft statue on a 3 ft pedestal	City of LA.
Pancho Villa Bust		Unknown Artist	1980	Lincoln Heights (Lincoln Park)	34°03′56.1″N 118°12′21.5″W	Bronze	2 ft bust on a 4 ft pedestal	
Ramon Lopez Velarde Bust		Francisco Zúñiga	1988	Lincoln Heights (Lincoln Park)	34°03′56.5″N 118°12′21.4″W	Bronze	2 ft bust on a 4 ft pedestal	
Venustiano Carranza Bust		Victor Gutierrez	1980	Lincoln Heights (Lincoln Park)	34°03′56.5″N 118°12′21.1″W	Bronze	2 ft bust on a 4 ft pedestal	
The Wall: Las Memorias AIDS Monument		David Angelo and Robin Brailsford	2024	Lincoln Heights (Lincoln Park)	34°03′57.1″N 118°12′26.1″W	Bronze	two public art components, six murals on freestanding walls and a stainless steel archway sculpture	City of LA donated by The Wall Las Memorias Foundation

== Harbor ==
Title	Image	Artist	Year	Location	Coordinates	Material	Dimensions	Owner
Mojo		Christian Moeller	2011	San Pedro (7th & Centre St.)	33°44′16.7″N 118°17′00.2″W	Metal, light, robotic arm, and surveillance cameras.	25 ft	Centre Street Lofts, Los Angeles, California 78430031
Korean Bell of Friendship			1976	San Pedro (Gaffey & 37th St.)		Bronze bell housed in a stone pavilion		Korean American Peace Park, Gift to USA from Korea for its Bicentenial

== South Los Angeles ==
Title	Image	Artist	Year	Location	Coordinates	Material	Dimensions	Owner
Martin Luther King Memorial & Tree Grove			2018	Baldwin Hills (Kenneth Hahn Park)	34°00′30″N 118°21′43″W	Stone Obelisk	15 ft	Los Angeles Parks.
Mama Watts		Bill Watts	1965	Watts (Watts Towers)	33°56′19.4″N 118°14′30.7″W	Concrete	5 ft	City of LA.
Monument to Vicente Fernandez		Sergio Garval	2023	Walnut Park (Plaza Alameda)	33°58′28″N 118°13′59″W	Bronze	10 ft	AJUA (Association of United Jaliscienses in Action).
World Wars Mid-City Memorial		Unknown Artist	1936	Baldwin Hills (La Brea Ave & Adams Blvd)	34°01′56.5″N 118°21′04.5″W	Stone	15 ft	Commissioned by the American Legion. City of LA.
Wish Dandelions		Heath Satow	2014	Alameda (Slauson Ave & S Central Ave)	33°59′17.6″N 118°15′28.5″W	Metal		City of LA. -
Walk a mile in my shoes		Kim Ables	2014	Baldwin Hills	34°01′18″N 118°22′37″W	Cast iron shoes on 35 concrete pedestals / Civil rights memorial	8 ft	Los Angeles Parks.

== The Valley ==
Title	Image	Artist	Year	Location	Coordinates	Material	Dimensions	Owner
Amelia Earhart		Ernest Shelton	1971	North Hollywood (Magnolia Blvd & Tujunga Ave)	34°09′54.1″N 118°22′45.1″W	Bronze		City of LA
Emmy Statue			1991	North Hollywood (Academy of Television Arts & Sciences Headquarters)	34°09′57.2″N 118°22′28.1″W	Bronze	18 ft	Television Academy
NoHo Gateway		Peter Shire	2009	North Hollywood (Lankershim Blvd & Huston St)	34°09′34.6″N 118°22′17.4″W	Bronze, Metal and Slate		City of LA.

== West Los Angeles ==
Title	Image	Artist	Year	Location	Coordinates	Material	Dimensions	Owner
Air		Aristide Maillol	Modeled 1938. Cast 1962.	Getty Center Forecourt	34°04′40.6″N 118°28′30.1″W	Lead	50 in × 94 in × 36 3/4 in	J. Paul Getty Museum, Los Angeles, California 68360015
Ballerina Clown		Jonathan Borofsky	1989	Venice Beach	33°59′46.1″N 118°28′40.3″W	Metal	30 ft tall	Harlan Lee
Venice Torso		Robert Graham	2007	Venice Beach	33°59′18″N 118°28′16″W	Aluminum	6 by 3 ft diameter anodized aluminum sculpture, mounted on a 4 ft circular stainless steel pedestal	https://www.publicartinpublicplaces.info/public-art-venice-torso-2007-by-robert-graham
Declaration (sculpture)		Mark di Suvero	2001	Venice Beach		Steel	60 ft tall	Installed for Venice Art Walk’s 22nd anniversary. It was only intended to be a display lasting six months, remains in place.
Elegy III		Barbara Hepworth	1969	University of California at Los Angeles, Los Angeles, California	34°04′30.9″N 118°26′25.9″W	Bronze	130 cm × 64 cm × 48 cm (51 in × 25 in × 19 in)	Administered by University of California at Los Angeles, Armand Hammer Museum of Art and Cultural Center, Los Angeles, California 3070034
Figure for Landscape		Barbara Hepworth	Modeled 1960. Cast 1968.	Getty Center Forecourt	34°04′40.6″N 118°28′30.1″W	Lead		J. Paul Getty Museum, Los Angeles, California 68360018
LAX Gateway Pylons		Paul Tsanetopoulos	2000	LAX	33°56′38.5″N 118°23′48.3″W	Glass	26 100 ft colored pylons	City of LA
Replica of Moses (Michelangelo)		Michelangelo		Cedars-Sinai Medical Center				Cedars-Sinai Medical Center
Spirit of 98 aka Lady Liberty		Roger Noble Burnham & David Wilkens	1950	Westwood (Los Angeles National Cemetery)	34°03′28.5″N 118°26′53.2″W	Concrete & Plaster	6 ft statue on a 10 ft platform	City of LA
Torso		Robert Graham	2003	Beverly Hills (Rodeo Drive)	34°04′03.8″N 118°24′05.4″W	Steel		Rodeo Drive Committee and City of Beverly Hills.
Crossed Currents		Don Merkt	1999	Culver City	34°01′02″N 118°23′20″W	Steel	28ft basket	

== See also ==
- Murals of Kobe Bryant
- Murals of Los Angeles
- Murals of P-22
