= Satow =

Satow may refer to:

== People with the surname ==
- Anyone with the Japanese family name Satō who romanizes it as Satow
- Ernest Mason Satow, diplomat
- Heath Satow, sculptor
- Michael Graham Satow, Engineer noted for railway preservation in the United Kingdom and India

== Places ==
- Satow, Germany
