= Court of Historic American Flags =

Los Angeles, California landmark

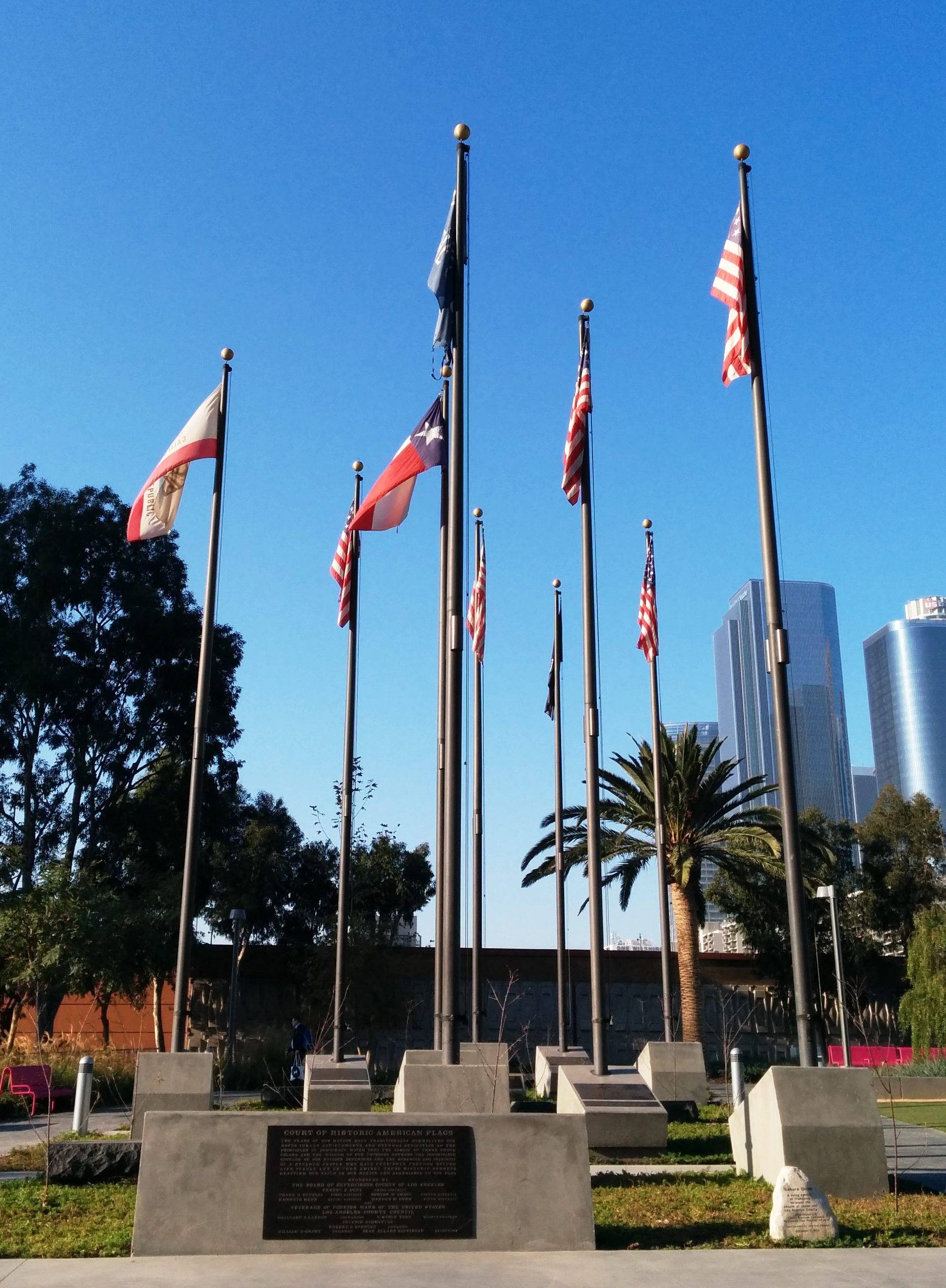
- The court in 2014

- Location within California
- Coordinates: 34°03′18″N 118°14′41″W

The Court of Historic American Flags is a collection of flagpoles and metal plaques in Los Angeles' Grand Park, in the U.S. state of California.

== Description and history ==
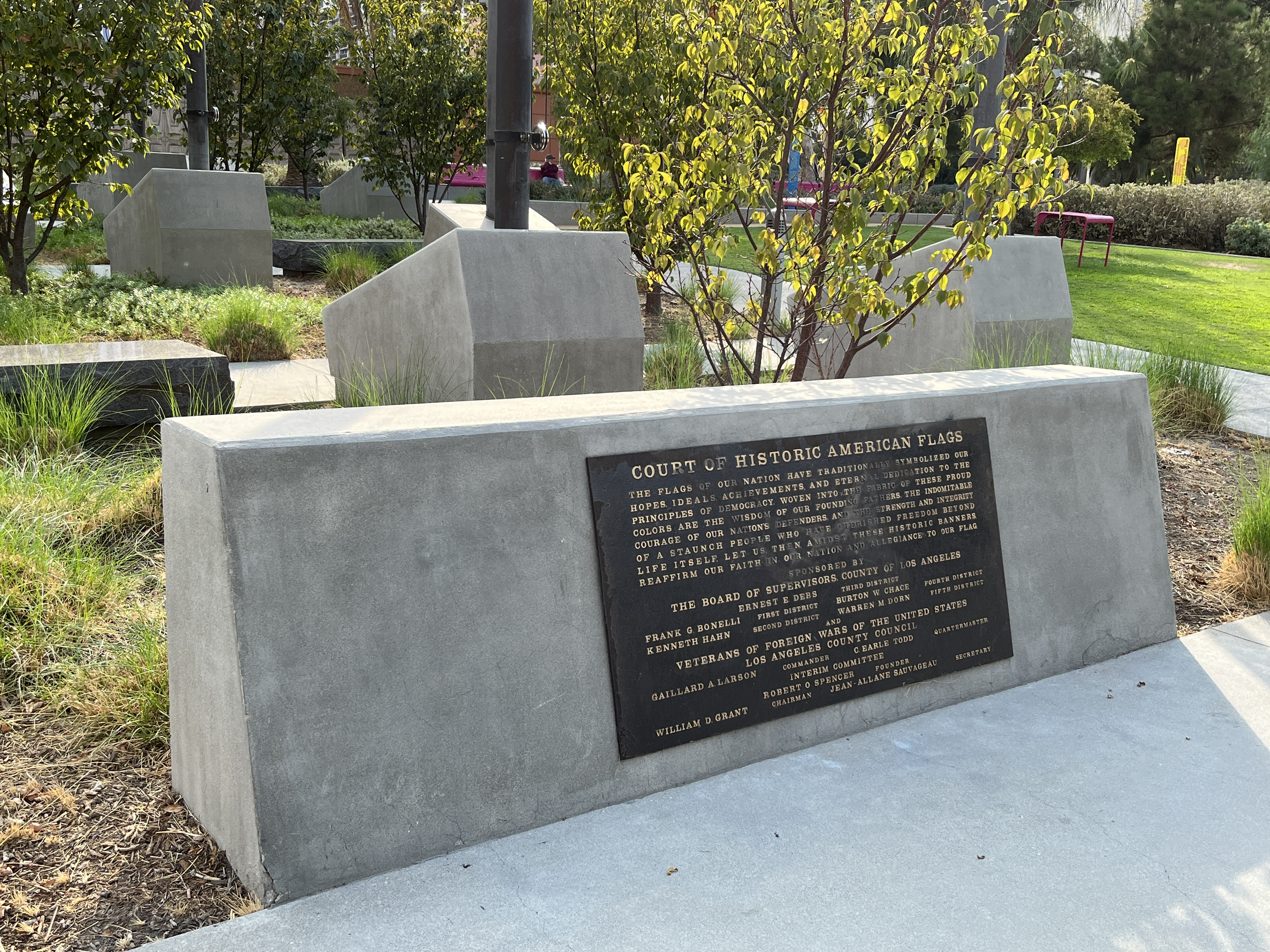
Plaque

The court's construction was funded by the County of Los Angeles Board of Supervisors and the Los Angeles County Council of the Veterans of Foreign Wars in the 1960s. It was created in 1971.

The following flags are displayed:

- Taunton “Liberty and Union” Flag
- Bunker Hill Battle Flag
- Liberty Tree Flag
- Moultrie Flag (Liberty Flag)
- Pine Tree “An Appeal to Heaven” Flag
- Gadsden flag
- Continental Union Flag
- Betsy Ross flag
- Bennington flag
- Star-Spangled Banner
- Lake Erie Flag (Don’t Give Up the Ship)
- Old Glory
- Lone Star Flag of Texas
- California Bear Republic Flag
- Fort Sumter Flag
- 48-Star Flag
- 50-Star American Flag (Official Flag)
- POW/MIA Flag

== See also ==
- List of public art in Los Angeles
