= Echo Park Lake =

Lake in Los Angeles, CA, US

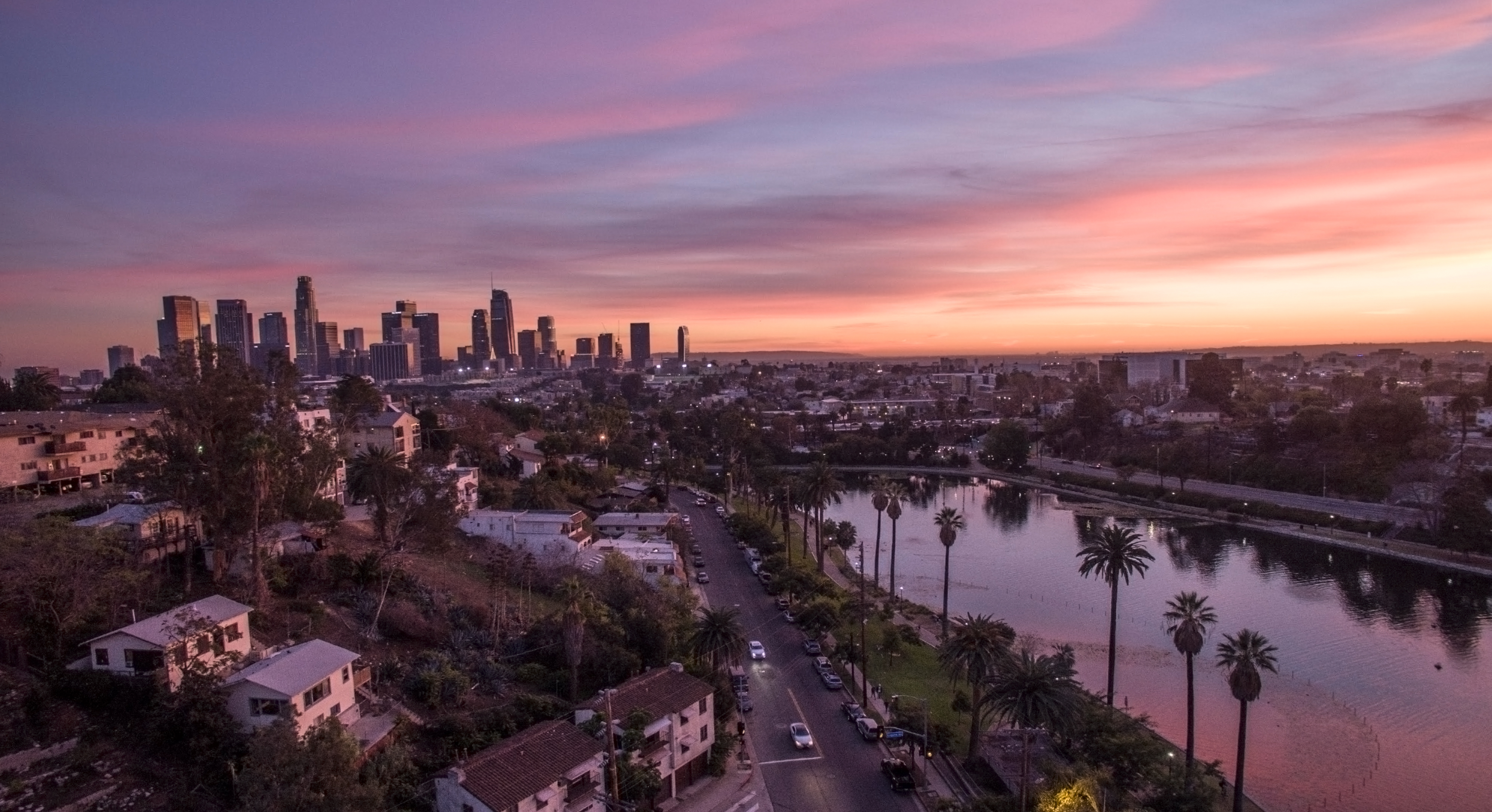
- Echo Park Lake and the Downtown Los Angeles skyline in 2016

- Location within the Los Angeles metropolitan area Location within California Location within the United States
- Location: Echo Park, Los Angeles, California
- Coordinates: 34°04′21″N 118°15′39″W
- Type: Lake
- Basin countries: United States
- Surface area: 14.1 acres (5.7 ha)
- Max. depth: 16 ft (4.9 m)
- Water volume: 86.5 acre⋅ft (106,700 m^{3})
- Surface elevation: 383 ft (117 m)

The Echo Park Lake is a lake and urban park in the Echo Park neighborhood of Los Angeles, California, United States. Originally constructed in the 1860s as a drinking water reservoir, it now primarily functions as a detention basin for storm water while also providing recreational opportunities and habitat for wildlife. Echo Park Lake also hosts community events, such as the annual Lotus Festival every July. The long history of Echo Park comes from a long period of renovation in 2013 and overcoming a homeless encampment in 2019, which was labeled as a "flashpoint in LA's homelessness crisis."

== History ==
=== Beginnings ===
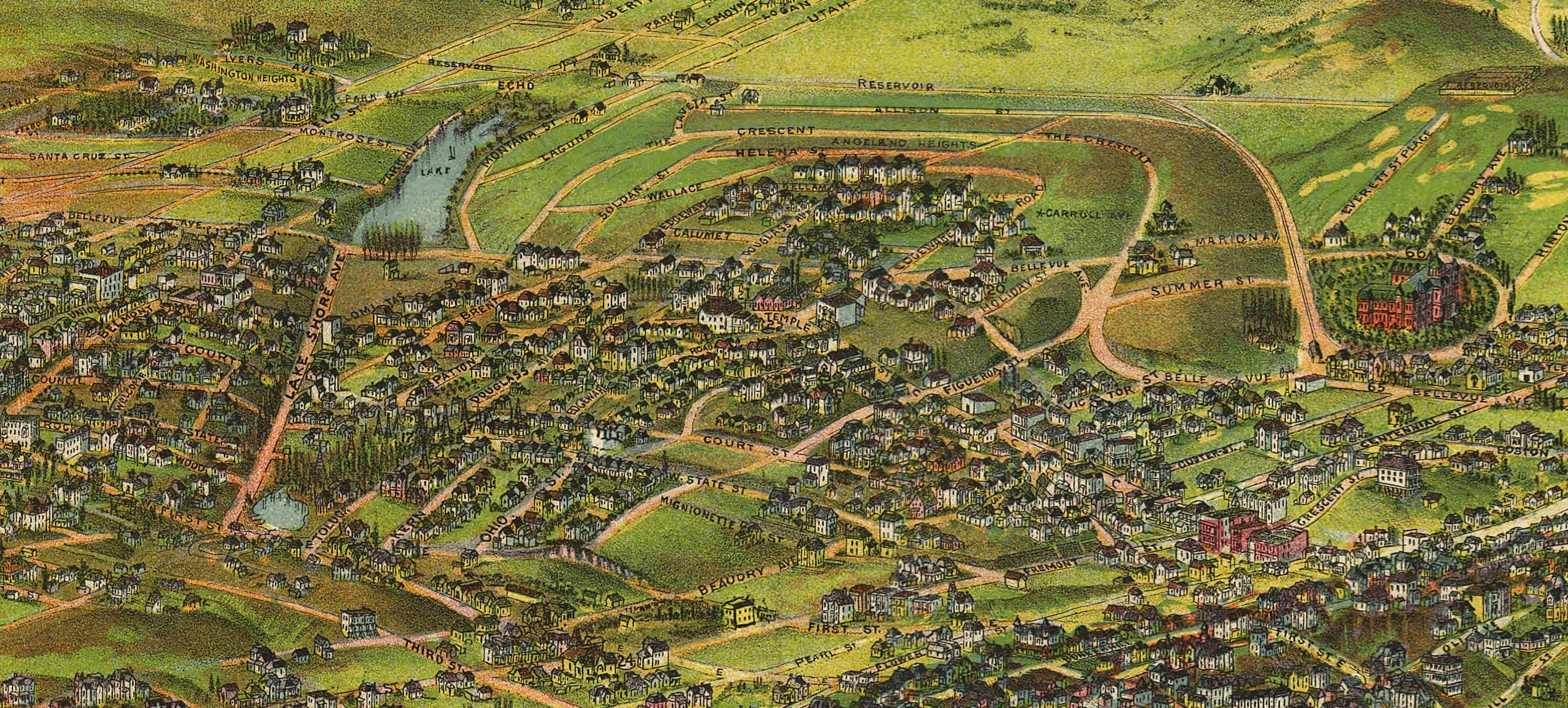
Echo Park Lake as depicted in 1894 at the top left. Glendale Boulevard is marked as Lake Shore Avenue. The Temple–Beaudry district is at the right center.

Echo Park Lake's earliest use by the city was as a reservoir for drinking water. The Los Angeles Canal and Reservoir Company formed Reservoir No. 4 in 1868. The company obtained the water by digging a ditch that sent water flowing from the Los Angeles River — in the area now known as Los Feliz — along a zigzag path that emptied into the reservoir.

In 1891 the four owners of the surrounding area gave up 33 acres (13 ha) of land to the city around the reservoir so that it could be used as a park. The city began work landscaping the park in October 1892. City parks superintendent Joseph Henry Tomlinson is recognized for coining the name of the new park, which later became the name of the neighborhood. He chose the name because of echoes he heard during the construction of Echo Park Lake in 1892. By 1895, the park and accompanying boathouse were completed.

By the late 1910s, motion picture companies on Allesandro Street, now Glendale Boulevard, had been using the park as a filming location. City leaders responded by barring Keystone Studios, home of the Keystone Cops, from shooting any of its comedies at the lake, on the grounds that too many flowers were being trampled.

=== 2000s–2010s: Revitalization ===
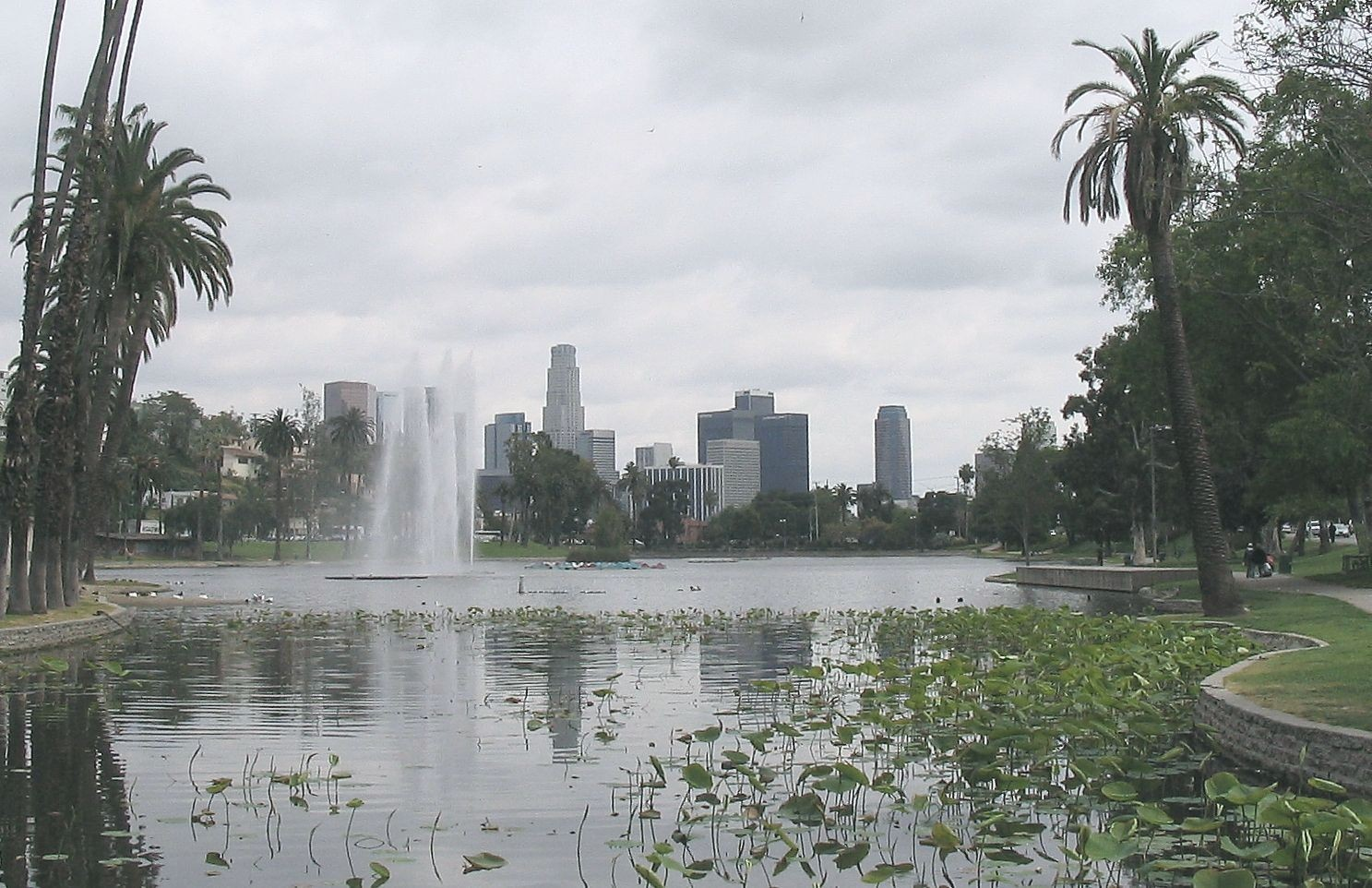
A view of Echo Park Lake towards downtown Los Angeles.

In 2006, the state of California identified Echo Park Lake as an impaired body of water, and the city allocated $64.7 million in 2010 to fund its cleanup and revitalization. The lake was closed off and drained in the summer of 2011 when renovation work began. The rehabilitation project tackled Echo Park Lake not only as a recreational body of water, but also as an important part of the Los Angeles ecosystem. Although Echo Park Lake is man-made, it is part of the local watershed. As part of the rehabilitation project, the lake was drained and dredged, a wetlands feature was added, a new boardwalk and walking paths were added, and aquatic plants and lotus flowers were re-planted. The lake reopened on June 5, 2013, after a $45 million renovation. A temporary chain-link fence was placed along the park's perimeter, to protect vegetation and to enable authorities to monitor activity in the park.

Lotus Bed Restoration and Floral:

The lotus beds are a long-standing feature of Echo Park Lake and have become a recognizable symbol of the surrounding community. Lotus plants were growing in the lake by the 1920s, and their seasonal blooms later became associated with the annual Lotus Festival. By 2008, the plants nearly disappeared following several years of declining growth. Although poor water quality and stormwater runoff were among the suspected causes, the exact cause of the die-off was not established.

During the lake's restoration, horticulturalist Randy McDonald supplied lotus plants propagated from cuttings he had collected from the lake in 2005. In 2013, Los Angeles replanted the lotus beds as part of the lake's $45 million renovation. Overall, the restoration helped bring back the important symbol of the local community identity.

=== 2010s-present: Homelessness ===
Starting in November 2019, a growing population of homeless people began moving into tents throughout the park, eventually covering the northwest corner of the facility and the entire west bank by the lake. As the encampment grew in size, crime at the park surged, disproportionately affecting the homeless. Four homeless individuals died at the park in 2020.

On March 25, 2021, the park was closed for renovations and cleared of nearly 200 homeless tents. The park was cordoned off with chain-link fencing. This was done to address the significant increase in the homeless population throughout the park and repair any damage. Closure notices were posted throughout the park at least a day before the sweep, but a crowd of over 200 protesters met LAPD. This situation escalated tension between neighbors on how to handle the homeless problem in Los Angeles properly.

The lake reopened on May 26, 2021, after the tents were removed. Upon its reopening, the park was closed after hours, from 10 pm to 5 am nightly. The city spent $1.1 million to repair and clean up the park. The cleanup effort yielded 35 t (35,000 kg) of trash, including 700 lb (320 kg) of biological waste and 30 lb (14 kg) of drug paraphernalia.

183 people experiencing homelessness at Echo Park Lake were successfully moved into transitional housing. By March 2022, only 17 individuals had transitioned to permanent housing, and 48 remained on a waiting list. The remainder had returned to homelessness.

After the 2022 Los Angeles elections, Hugo Soto-Martinez was elected as the council member for Los Angeles's 13th City Council district, where the lake is located. He had campaigned to remove the fence, calling it a symbol of the city's "biggest policy failure on homelessness."

On February 2, 2023, Soto-Martinez announced plans to remove the fence. The issue immediately proved divisive, with many concerned residents and park visitors expressing safety and cleanliness concerns and fearful of a return to the homeless encampments. Others advocated for the fence to remain, or for a permanent wrought iron fence to be installed around the park's perimeter, similar to other parks in the city, like the Los Angeles State Historic Park. While Soto-Martinez struggled to convince concerned residents and local businesses, he otherwise remained intransigent. The fencing was removed in late March 2023 and since then has been free of homelessness.

== Public art ==
Ada Mae Sharpless's sculpture, "Our Queen of the Angels," was donated to the city in 1935 and installed at the edge of Echo Park Lake, and became immediately popular at its installation. Despite its official title, it has become popularly known as "The Lady of the Lake".

== In popular culture ==
- Twenty Minutes of Love is a 1914 short silent film starring Charlie Chaplin, which takes place at Echo Park Lake.
- Recreation is a 1914 short silent film starring Charlie Chaplin, which takes place at Echo Park Lake.
- The Academy Award-winning 1974 film Chinatown by Director Roman Polanski has a scene taking place in Echo Park. In the movie's third-most-famous scene, Jake (Jack Nicholson) pretends to photograph his associate, as cover for snapping Hollis and Katherine, while boating on Echo Park Lake.
- The 2018 film Under the Silver Lake was filmed at Echo Park Lake.
- The 1980s song "Echo Park" by Brian Setzer is a studio outtake released in 1999 and references the local lake, "I used to swim in Echo Park Lake all night."
- The 2003 film National Security uses Echo Park Lake as a filming location.
- The 2009, music video for the song "End Love" by the rock band OK Go was filmed in Echo Park Lake and made one of the local geese a celebrity.

== See also ==
- Echo Park
- List of lakes in California
