= Bank of America Plaza (Los Angeles) =

55-story class-A office skyscraper on Bunker Hill, Los Angeles

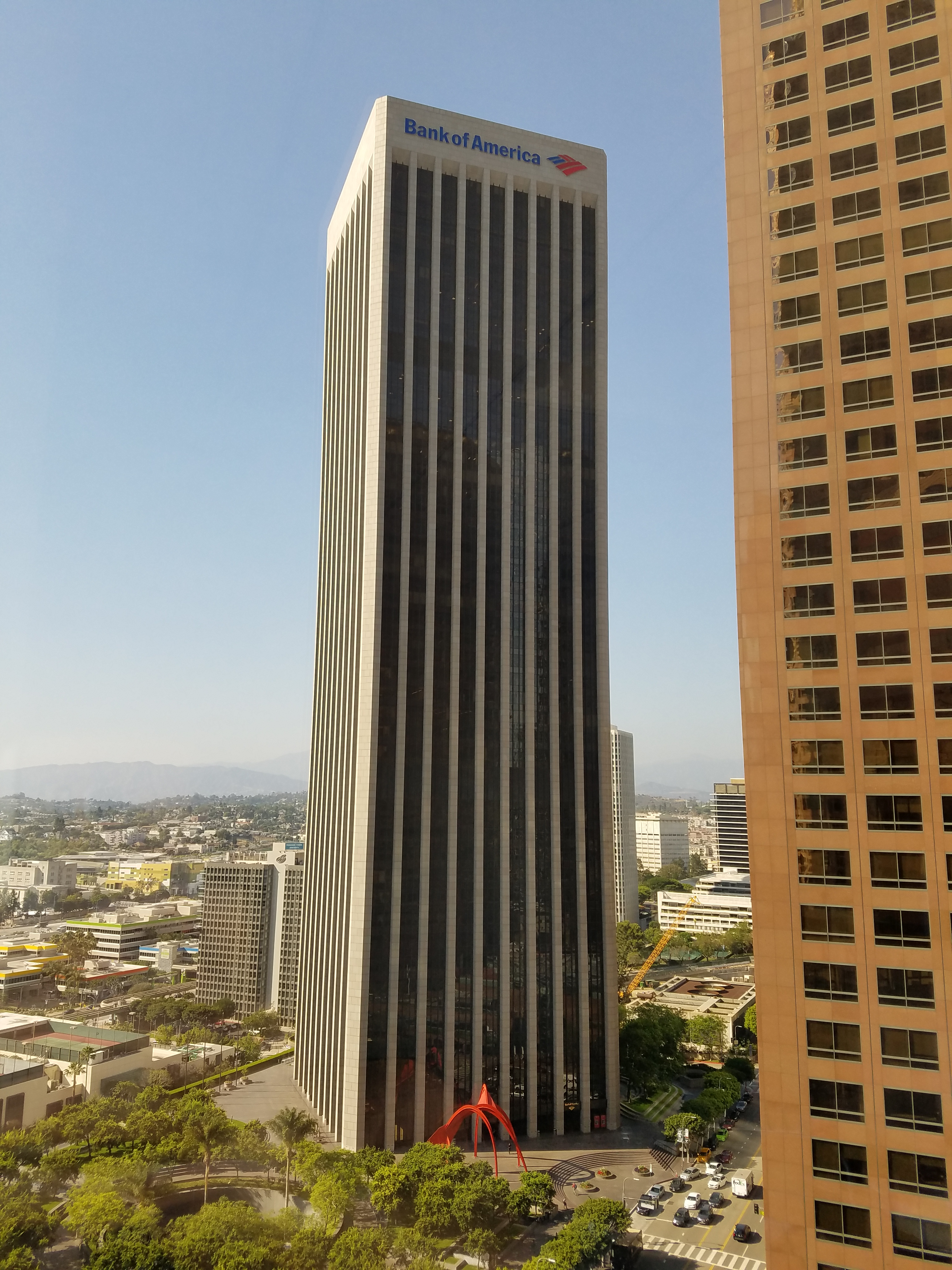
- Alternative names: 333 South Hope Plaza; Security Pacific Plaza

General information
- Type: Commercial offices
- Location: 333 South Hope; Los Angeles, California
- Coordinates: 34.0536°N 118.25305°W
- Construction started: 1971
- Completed: 1974
- Owner: Capital Group Companies
- Operator: Brookfield Properties

Height
- Roof: 224.03 m (735.0 ft)

Technical details
- Floor count: 55; 9 below ground
- Floor area: 1,422,000 sq ft (132,100 m^{2})

Design and construction
- Architects: Albert C. Martin & Associates; Peter Walker & Partners
- Main contractor: Turner Construction Co.

Other information
- Public transit: Grand Avenue Arts/Bunker Hill

Bank of America Plaza, formerly Security Pacific Plaza, is a 55-story, 224.03 m (735.0 ft) class-A office skyscraper on Bunker Hill, Los Angeles, California, United States. It was completed in 1974 with the headquarters of Security Pacific National Bank, Capital Group Companies and Sheppard, Mullin, Richter & Hampton as its main tenants. The tower is the fifth tallest building in Los Angeles, and the 92nd-tallest building in the United States. In 2009 it had the highest assessed value of any office building in Los Angeles County. When it was constructed, Security Pacific Plaza was unique for Downtown Los Angeles, in that its four sides each faced true north, south, east and west. It has a total of 64 floors, 55 above ground and 9 basements, served by 30 elevators.

The building site is situated on 4.21 acres (1.70 ha) that features a formal garden with over 200 trees and three 24 ft (7.3 m) waterfalls. In front of the main entrance is the 42-foot (13 m) "Four Arches" sculpture by Alexander Calder.

== History ==
From when it opened in 1974 until 1992, it bore the Security Pacific Bank logo. This logo was removed when Bank of America acquired Security Pacific Bank. Capital Group purchased the building in 2026 after having offices there since 1978. They became the largest and anchor tenant as they consolidated Los Angeles offices into the new corporate headquarters.

Featured in several motion pictures, such as being used as the fictional headquarters for Mattel in the film Barbie. Its plaza area was also filmed as that of the adjacent "Peerless Building" to the Glass Tower in The Towering Inferno (which was set in San Francisco), as well as the lawyer's office in the film Pretty Woman, and as Tex Richman's office headquarters in The Muppets. The tower was also used in establishing shots as the headquarters for the fictional company Denver-Carrington in the 1991 prime time soap opera Dynasty. It also appears in shots of the 1982 pilot of the prime time detective series ‘’Matt Houston’’. The epilogue of Night of the Comet was filmed in the plaza, the tower having been prominently in the background of numerous scenes earlier in the film.

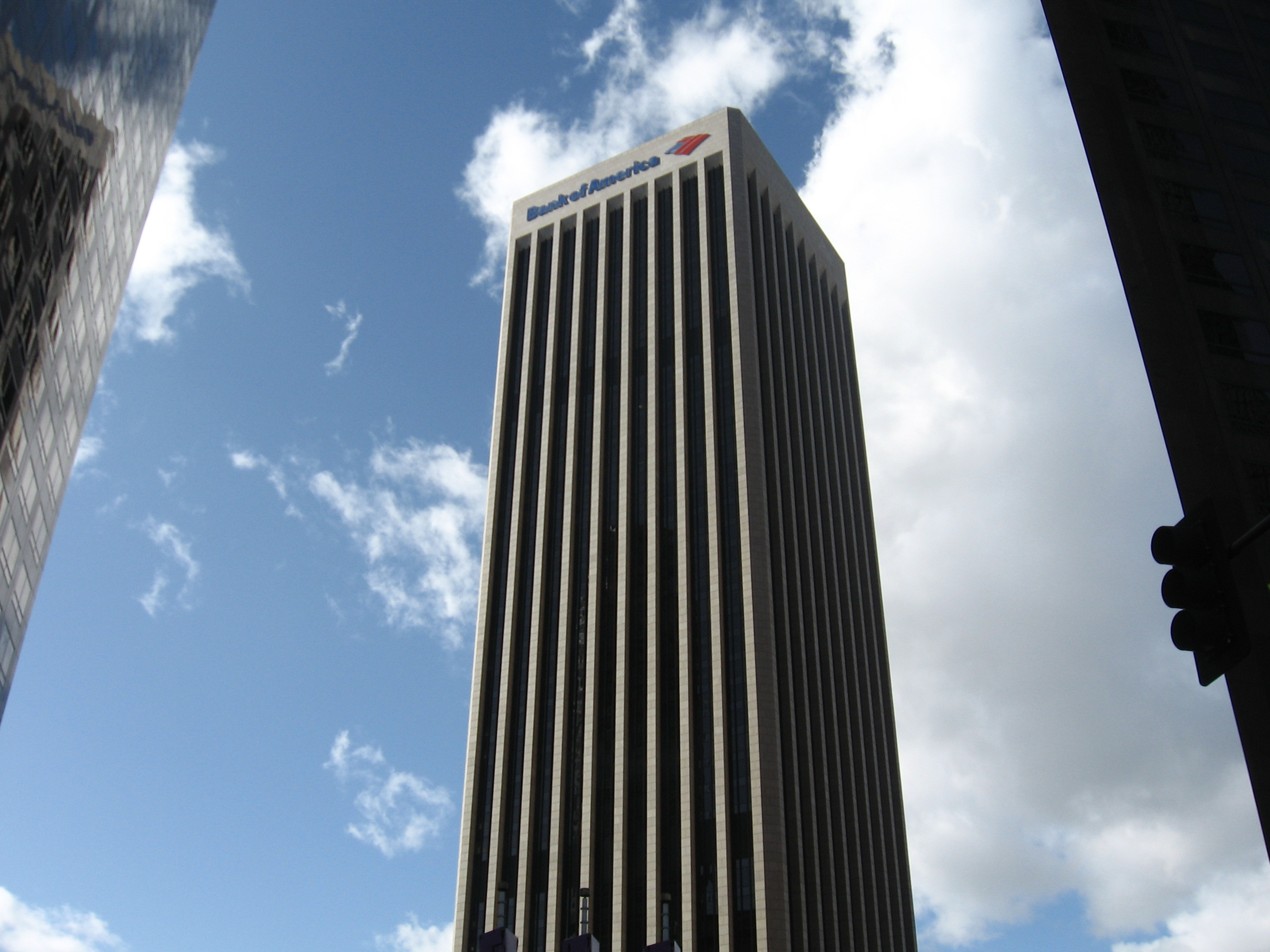
Bank of America Center in Downtown Los Angeles

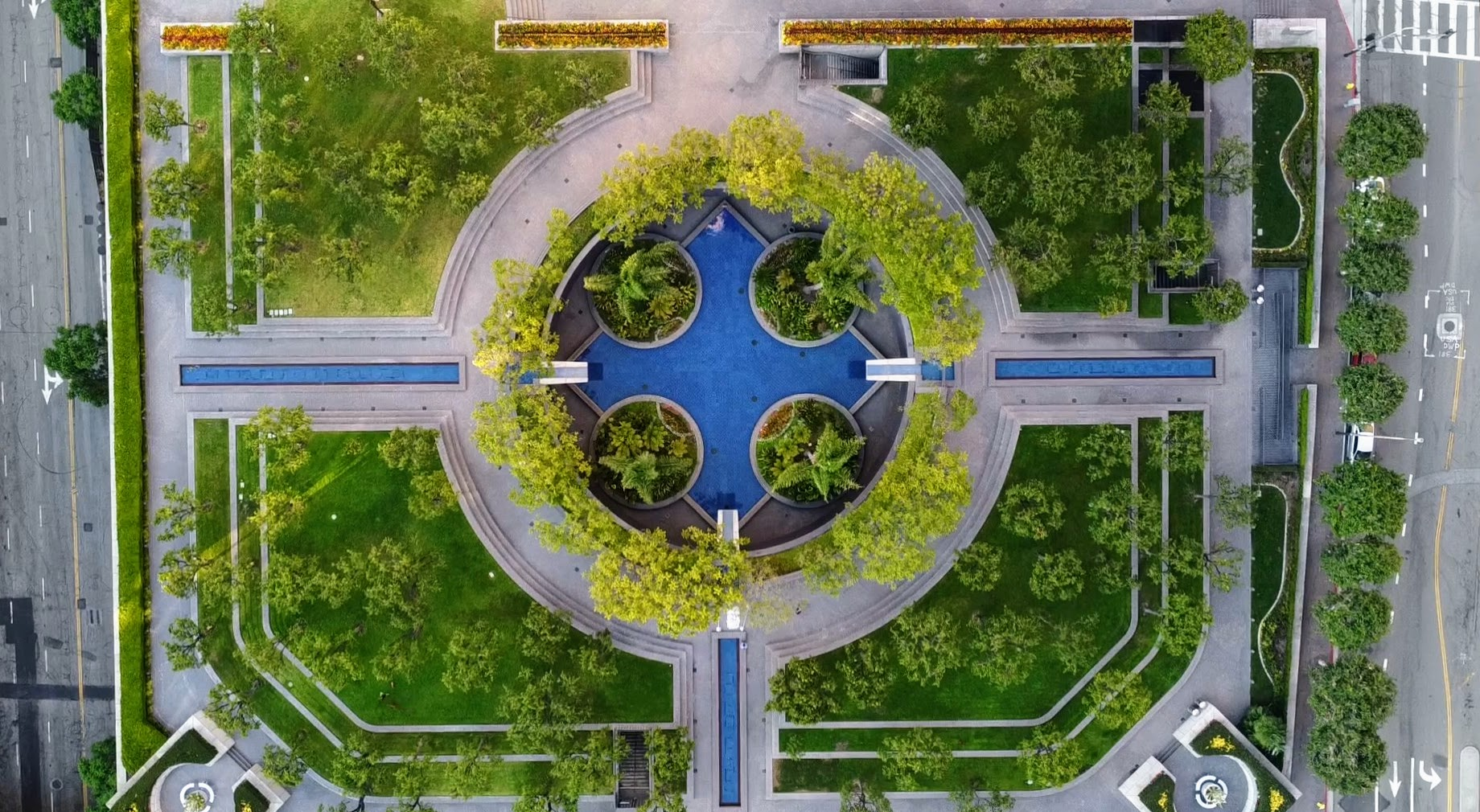
An aerial view of the underground fountain

== See also ==
- List of tallest buildings in Los Angeles
- List of tallest buildings in the United States
