= Frank Flint =

American politician (1862–1929)

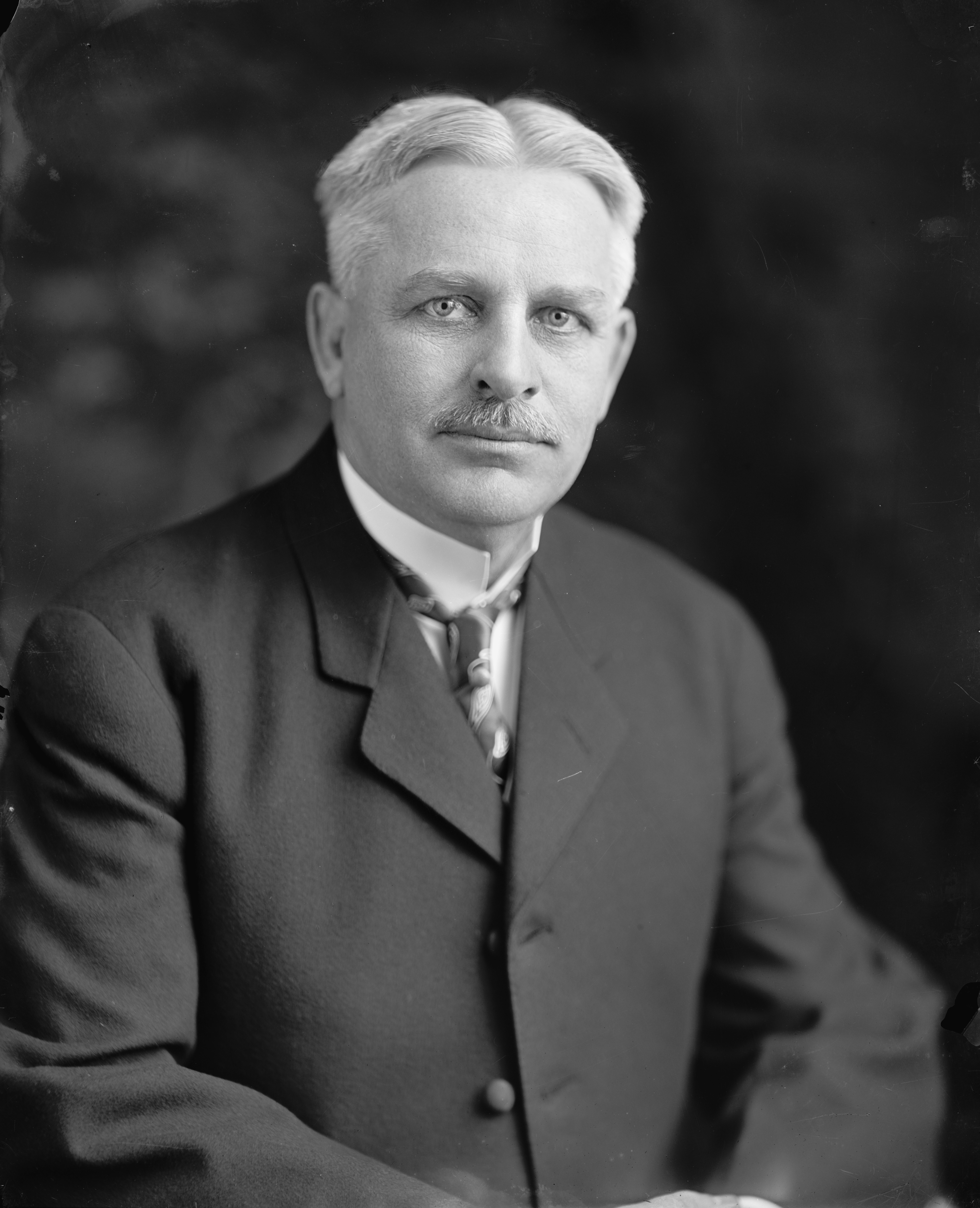
- Portrait c. 1905–1911

United States Senator from California
- In office March 4, 1905 – March 3, 1911
- Preceded by: Thomas R. Bard
- Succeeded by: John D. Works

Personal details
- Born: July 15, 1862 North Reading, Massachusetts, U.S.
- Died: February 11, 1929 (aged 66) near Manila, Philippines
- Resting place: Forest Lawn Memorial Park Cemetery; Glendale, California, U.S.
- Party: Republican
- Spouse: Katherine J. Bloss (m. 1890)
- Children: 2
- Occupation: Politician; lawyer; banker

Frank Putnam Flint (July 15, 1862 – February 11, 1929) was an American lawyer and politician who was a United States senator from California from 1905 to 1911.

== Early life ==
Frank Putnam Flint was born on July 15, 1862, in North Reading, Massachusetts, to Althea Louise (née Hewes) and Francis Eaton Flint. In 1869, his family moved to San Francisco, California, where he attended public schools. He had asthma. In 1888 he moved to Orange, then Los Angeles, California.

== Career ==
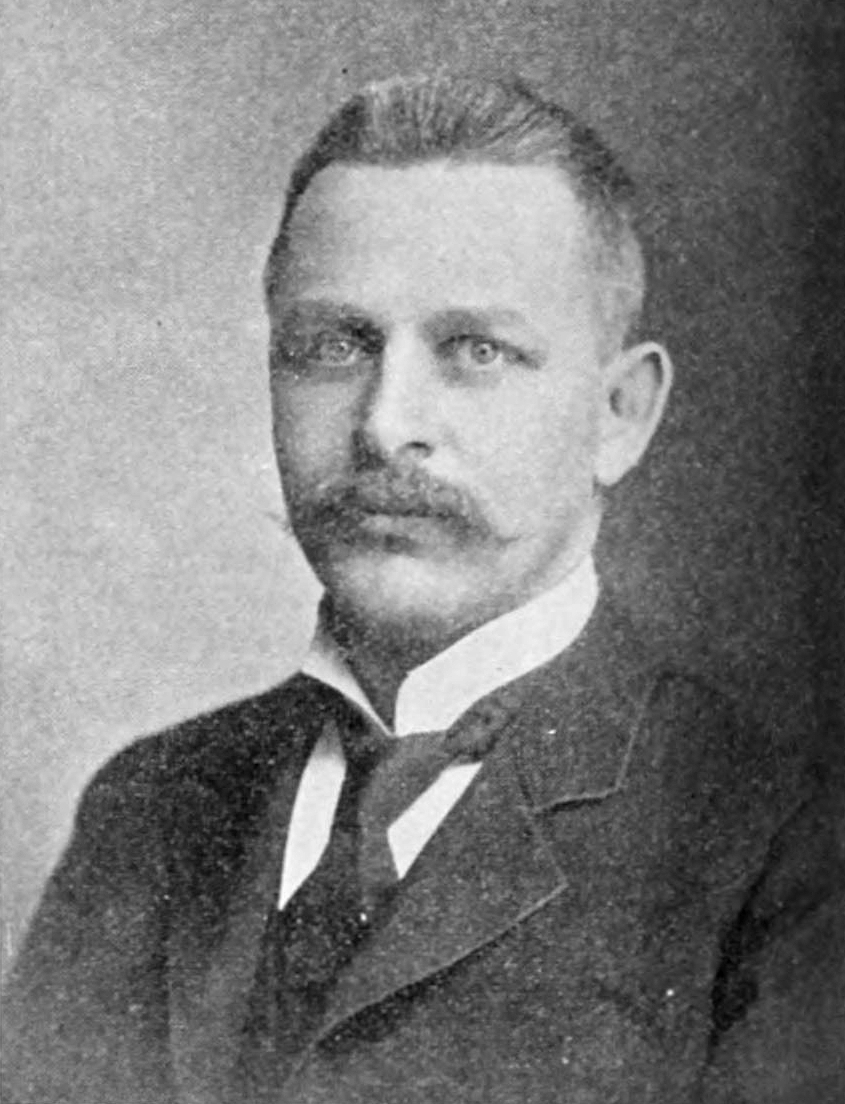
Flint c. 1897

In 1888 or 1890, he was appointed a clerk in the United States marshal's office in Los Angeles, and began to study law. In 1892 he was appointed assistant United States attorney under Mathew Thompson Allen. In 1893 he resigned and formed a law partnership with Allen, Allen & Flint, which lasted two years until Allen became a judge. In 1895, Flint and Donald Barker reformed the law firm as Flint & Barker. In 1897 Flint was appointed United States attorney for the southern district of California, and served four years. Flint was active in Republican politics. He was a fruit-grower, politician and banker.

In Los Angeles he was a member of the chamber of commerce and of its law committee; a member of the Municipal League, the Sunset club, the California Club, the Union League Club, the Republican League, the Masonic order and Knights Templar. He attended the Presbyterian Church, was a trustee of Occidental College, a director of two banks (Equitable Savings, Los Angeles National).

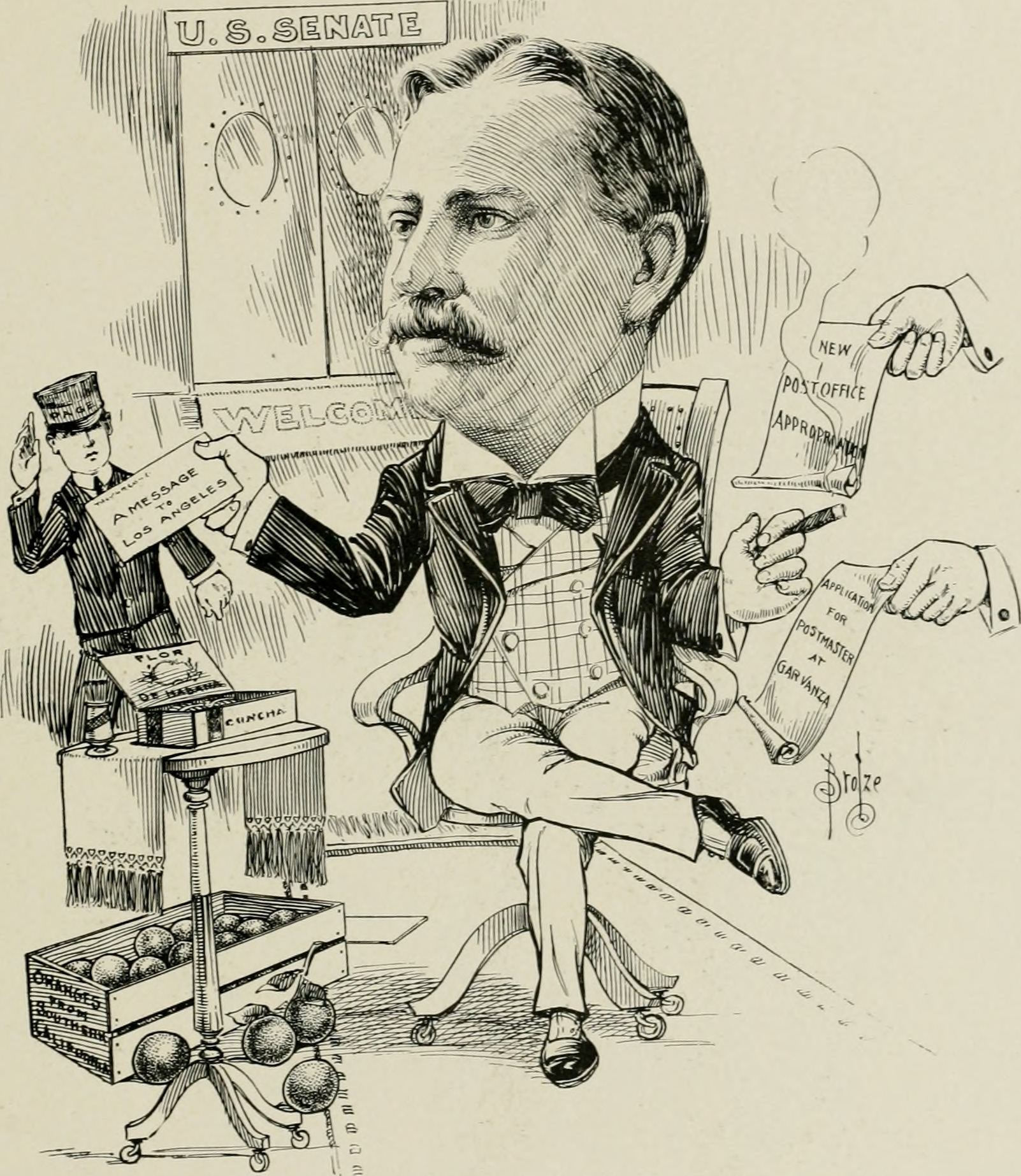
Caricature of Flint c. 1900

He served as United States Attorney for the Southern District of California from 1897 to 1901 and as a U.S. Senator from California from 1905 until 1911 as a Republican, and holds the distinction of being the 1000th senator in overall seniority. Flint served one term in the Senate and did not seek reelection.

Flint was elected as president of the board of trustees of Occidental College in 1914. Flint served as chairman of the National Boulder Dam Association and advocated for the building of the Boulder Dam (later renamed the Hoover Dam). In 1915, he became president of the Los Angeles Investment Company. He served in that role until his resignation in October 1928.

== Personal life ==
On February 25, 1890, he married Katherine J. Bloss in Los Angeles; they had two children. His brother Motley H. was postmaster of Los Angeles. Flint lived on Flintridge Avenue in Pasadena. He was a majority stockholder of Flintridge Country Club, but in 1927 withdrew his stake.

Flint died on February 11, 1929, aboard the S.S. President Polk near the harbor of Manila. His body lay in state at Los Angeles City Hall. He was interred in the Forest Lawn Memorial Park Cemetery in Glendale.

== Legacy ==
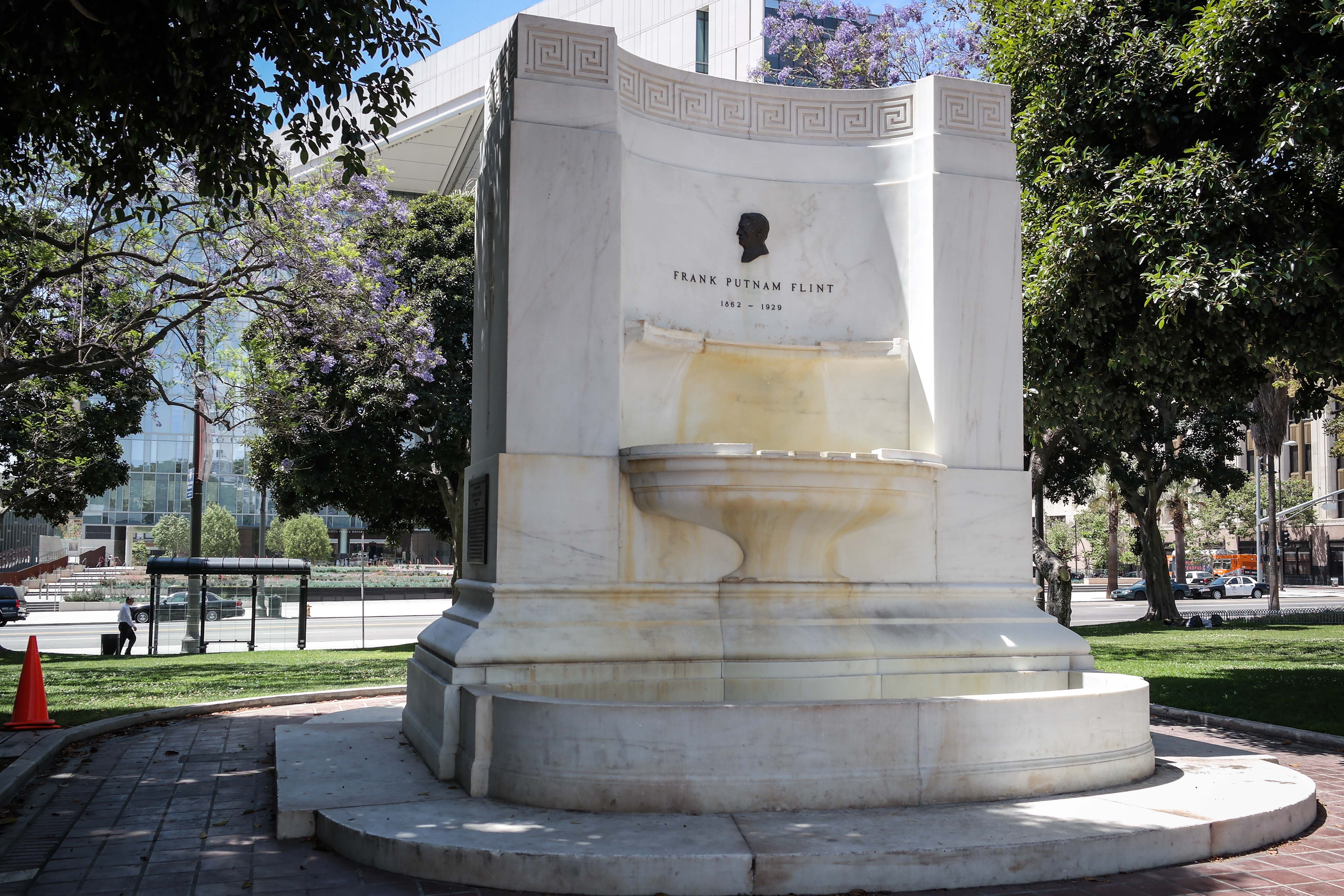
Fountain in Los Angeles memorializing Flint

The city of La Cañada Flintridge, California, is named, in part, for him, as he was a developer of Flintridge, which merged with La Cañada in the late 20th century. As a senator from California, he played a great part in making the Mission style the official architectural style of government buildings in Southern California and played a major political role in bringing Owens Valley water to metropolitan Los Angeles.

== See also ==
- Frank Putnam Flint Fountain

U.S. Senate
Preceded by Thomas R. Bard	U.S. senator (Class 1) from California; 1905–1911; Served alongside: George C. Perkins	Succeeded by John D. Works
