= Union Bank Plaza =

Historic building in Los Angeles, California

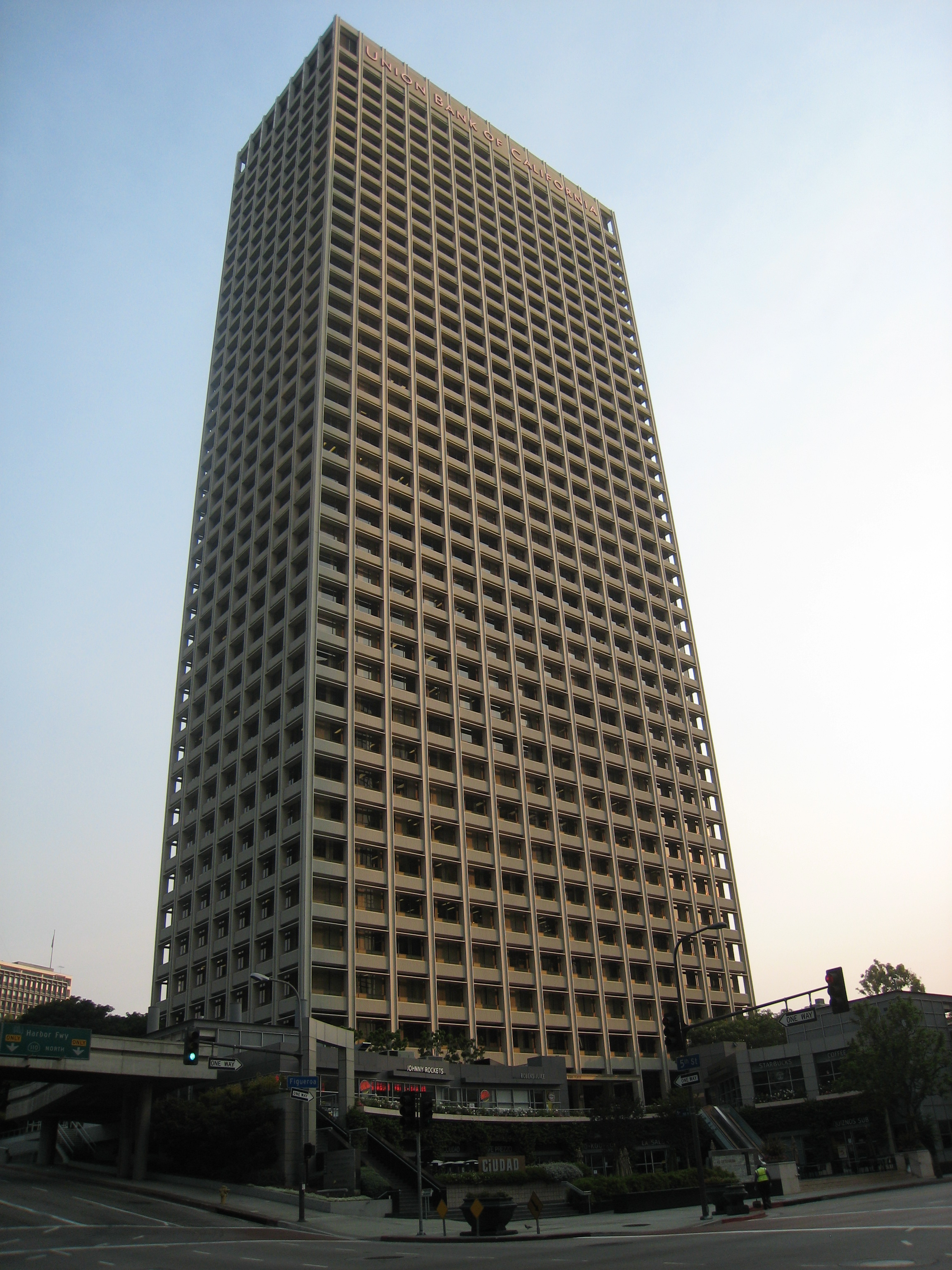

- Location within the Los Angeles metropolitan area Union Bank Plaza (California)
- Alternative names: UBC Plaza; Union Bank of California Building; Bunker Hill Square

General information
- Type: Commercial offices
- Architectural style: International style
- Location: 445 South Figueroa Street; Los Angeles, California
- Coordinates: 34.0530°N 118.2572°W
- Completed: 1965 – 1968
- Owner: Waterbridge Capital

Height
- Roof: 157.28 m (516.0 ft)

Technical details
- Floor count: 40
- Floor area: 68,525 m^{2} (737,600 sq ft)
- Lifts/elevators: 19

Design and construction
- Architects: Albert C. Martin & Associates; Harrison & Abramovitz
- Services engineer: Jaros, Baum & Bolles (JB&B)
- Main contractor: Turner Construction

Los Angeles Historic-Cultural Monument
- Designated: February 26, 2020
- Reference no.: 1206

Union Bank Plaza is a Los Angeles Historic-Cultural Monument listed 40-story, 157 m (515 ft) office skyscraper located on South Figueroa Street in Downtown Los Angeles, California.

== History ==
Designed collaboratively by Harrison & Abramovitz and A.C. Martin & Associates, construction of the building began in 1965 and was completed in 1968 for the Connecticut General Life Insurance Company. It was the first skyscraper built in the central business district of Los Angeles as part of the Bunker Hill redevelopment project following the repeal of limitations on construction greater than 150 feet in height in 1957. Noted landscape architect Garrett Eckbo designed the three-acre modernist outdoor plaza on top of the parking garage.

The property was named for the formerly Los Angeles based Union Bank & Trust Company, who leased 14 floors for their corporate headquarters. Having gone through a number of mergers and acquisitions over the years, successive owners have maintained the brand and retained the naming rights for their west coast offices, however Union Bank's December 2022 merger with U.S. Bancorp has resulted into folding the Union Bank name into the U.S. Bank brand, who also leases the U.S. Bank Tower for their Los Angeles offices, so the future of the naming rights are currently uncertain. Union Bank Plaza was also acquired by Waterbridge Capital for roughly $110,000,000 in March 2023.

Currently the 22nd tallest building in Los Angeles, the complex was named a Los Angeles Historic Cultural Monument in 2020, the first skyscraper in Los Angeles to earn that distinction.

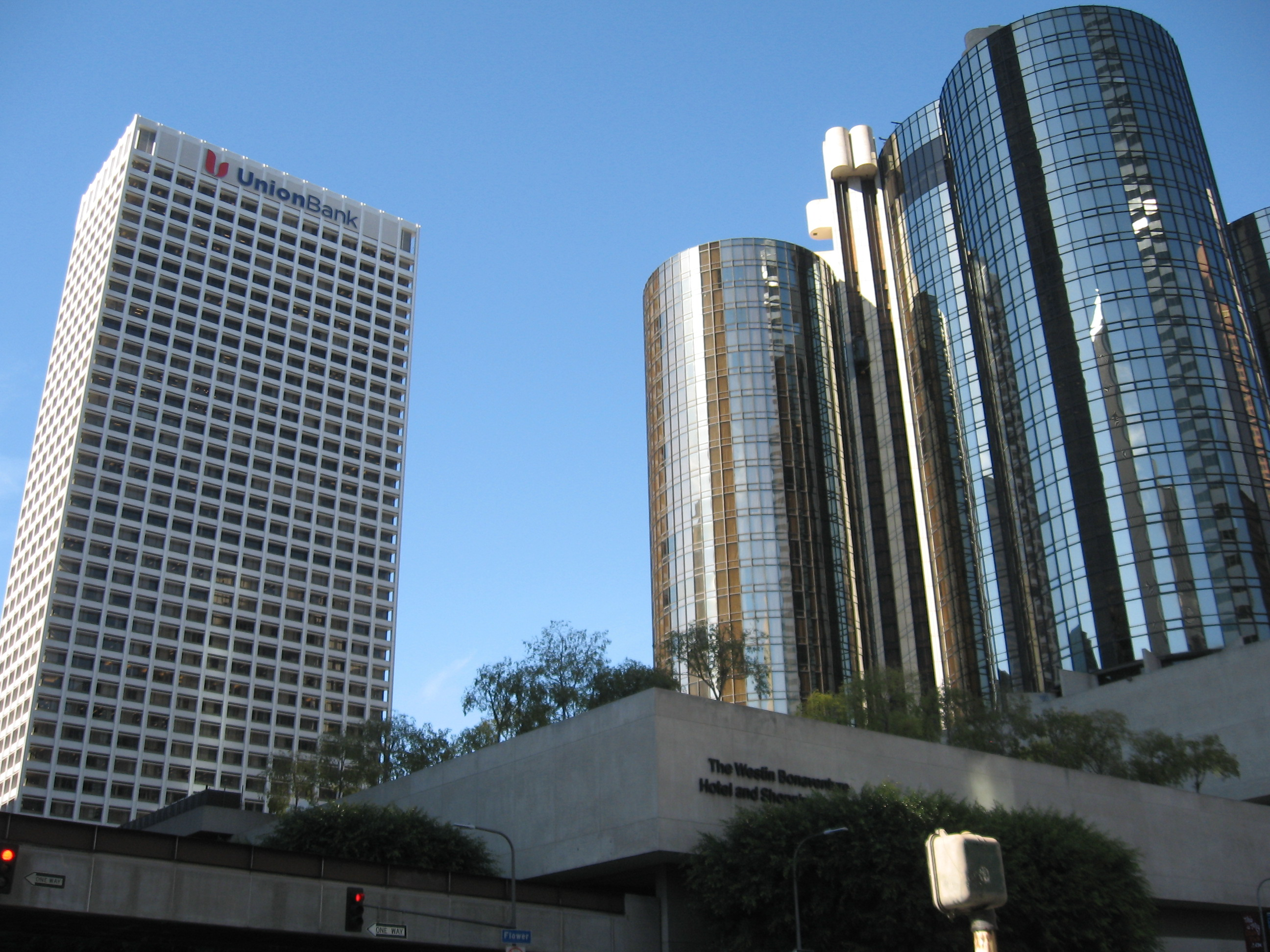
Union Bank Plaza and the Westin Bonaventure

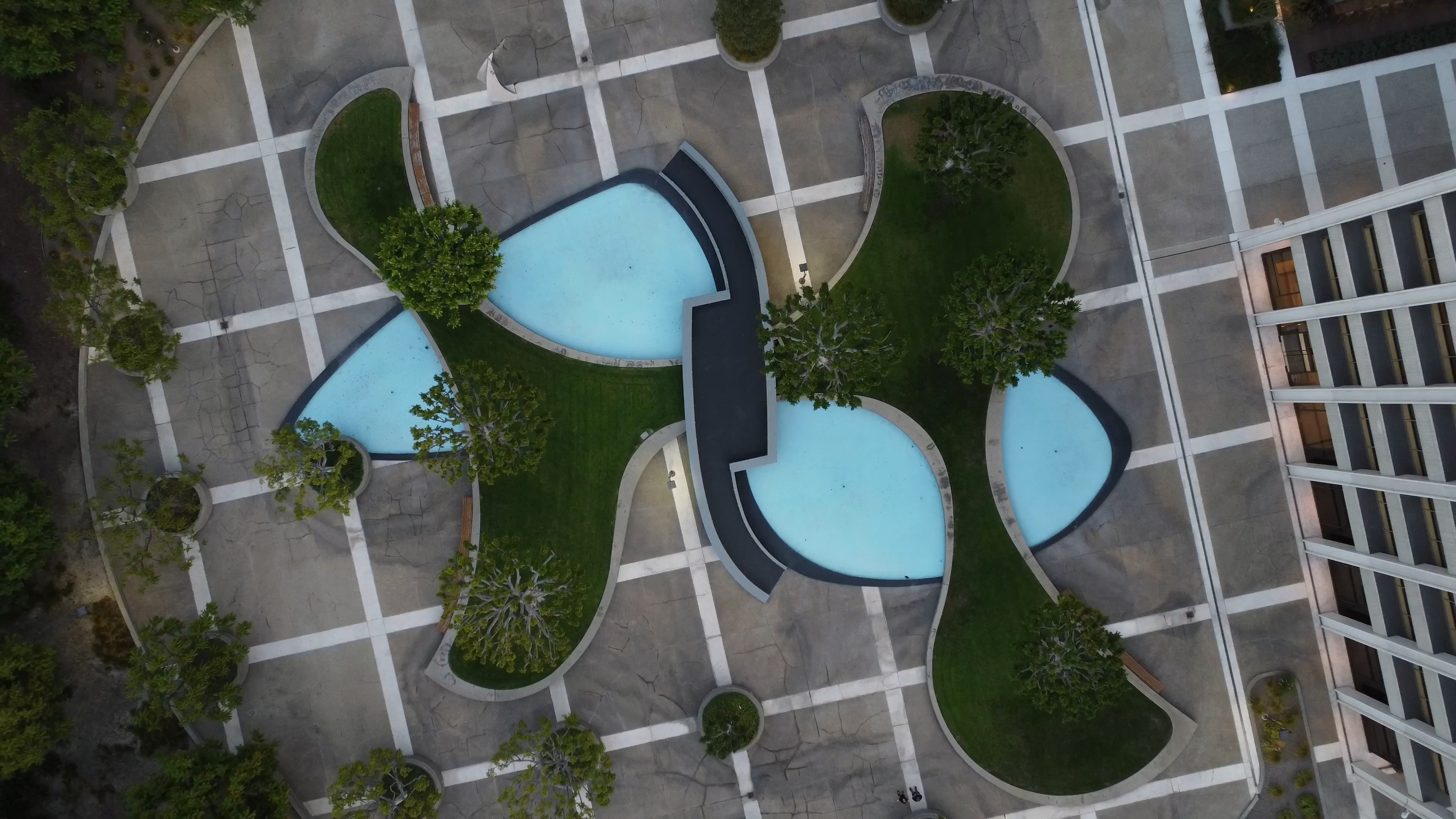
Aerial view of the garden

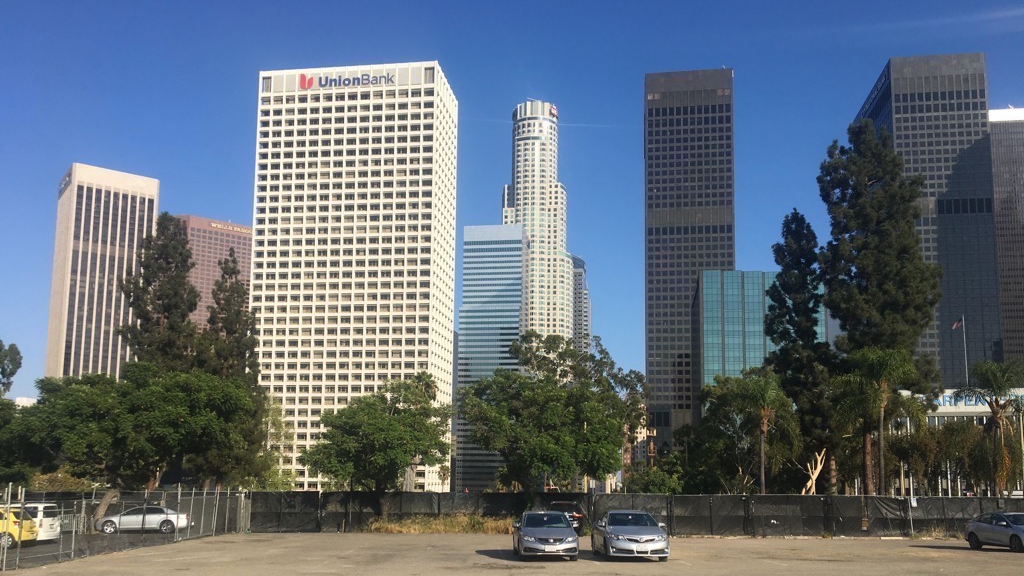
Union Bank Plaza from across the 110 Fwy

== See also ==
- Aquarius (sculpture), installed outside the building
- List of tallest buildings in Los Angeles
