= Homage to Cabrillo: Venetian Quadrant =

Sculpture in Los Angeles, California, U.S.

- The sculpture in 2022
- Artist: Eugene Sturman
- Year: 1985
- Location: Los Angeles, California, U.S.
- 34°2′47.1″N 118°15′44.4″W

Homage to Cabrillo: Venetian Quadrant is a 1985 metal sculpture by Eugene Sturman, installed in Los Angeles, California. The 33-foot bronze and stainless steel artwork was valued at $250,000 as of 1985.

The work was surveyed as part of the Smithsonian Institution's "Save Outdoor Sculpture!" program in 1994. The following description is used in the survey: "Comprised of four main elements which form a quadrant, representing the four corners of the earth or four points of the celestial sphere, and two long conical shapes which encompass a time capsule."
