= Mojo (Moeller) =

Sculpture by Christian Moeller in Los Angeles, California, U.S.

- Artist: Christian Moeller
- Year: 2008
- Type: Metal, light, robotic arm
- Dimensions: 926.8 cm (30 ft 4 7/8 in)
- Location: Los Angeles; 34.04666°N 118.25186°W
- Owner: private

Mojo is a public artwork, by Christian Moeller. It is located at the Centre Street Lofts, 285 West 6th Street, at the corner of West 7th and Centre Streets, Los Angeles, California.
