= Aquarius (sculpture) =

Sculpture in Los Angeles, California, U.S.

- The sculpture in 2022
- Artist: Jerome Kirk
- Location: Los Angeles, California, U.S.
- 34°3′12.4″N 118°15′23.9″W

Aquarius is a 1969–1970 sculpture by Jerome Kirk, installed in Los Angeles's Bunker Hill neighborhood, in the U.S. state of California. The abstract, kinetic, stainless steel artwork is installed outside Union Bank Plaza. The Los Angeles Conservancy has described the work as a "fin-like metal mobile sculpture".
