= Ada Mae Sharpless =

American sculptor (1899–1988)

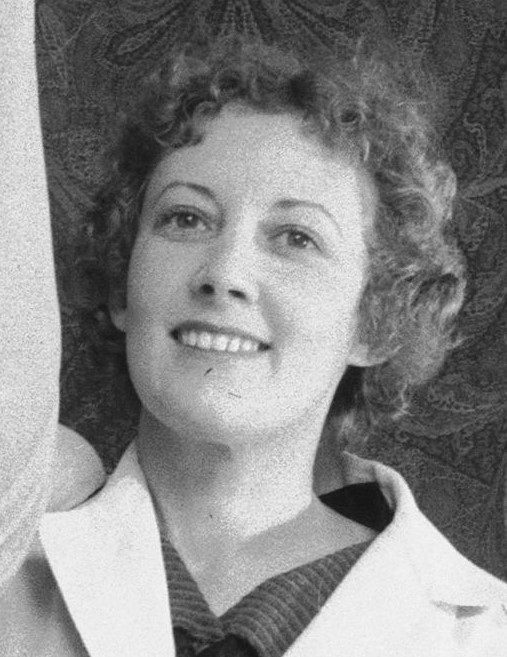
- Sharpless in 1935
- Born: August 16, 1899; Hilo, Hawaii
- Died: November 20, 1988 (aged 89); Kona, Hawaii
- Known for: Sculpture
- Movement: Art Deco

Ada May Sharpless (also spelled Ada Mae Sharpless) (August 16, 1899 – November 20, 1988) was an American artist and sculptor.

== Early life and education ==
She was born in Hilo, Hawaii, the daughter of missionaries Viola and Benjamin Harry Sharpless, and grew up in Santa Ana, California. She graduated from USC in 1922, studied art at the Otis Art Institute, and continued her studies in Paris for four years during the 1920s, with Antoine Bourdelle.

== Career ==
During the 1930s she created sculptures for several area parks and associations. She was a member of the California Art Club and the Laguna Beach Art Association.

=== Works of art ===
One of her most notable sculptures, ("Our Queen of the Angels"), was commissioned in 1934 by the federal Works Project Administration and funded by the Public Works of Art Project (PWAP). It was donated to the city in 1935 and installed at the edge of Echo Park Lake at Echo Park, Los Angeles, and became immediately popular at its installation. Despite its official title, it has become popularly known as "The Lady of the Lake." For this piece, Sharpless used the newly popular poured concrete material and technique commonly called "liquid stone." The sculpture is mounted on a four-sided pedestal faced with bas reliefs of the Hollywood Bowl, the Los Angeles harbor, the San Gabriel mountains, and the Los Angeles Central Library. After decades of deterioration it was restored and re-installed in 1999 by the City of Los Angeles.

Sharpless also made a full-length statue of Juan Rodriguez Cabrillo for the patio of the Bowers Museum in Santa Ana, California.
