= Bust of Lázaro Cárdenas (Los Angeles) =

Bust in Los Angeles, California, U.S.

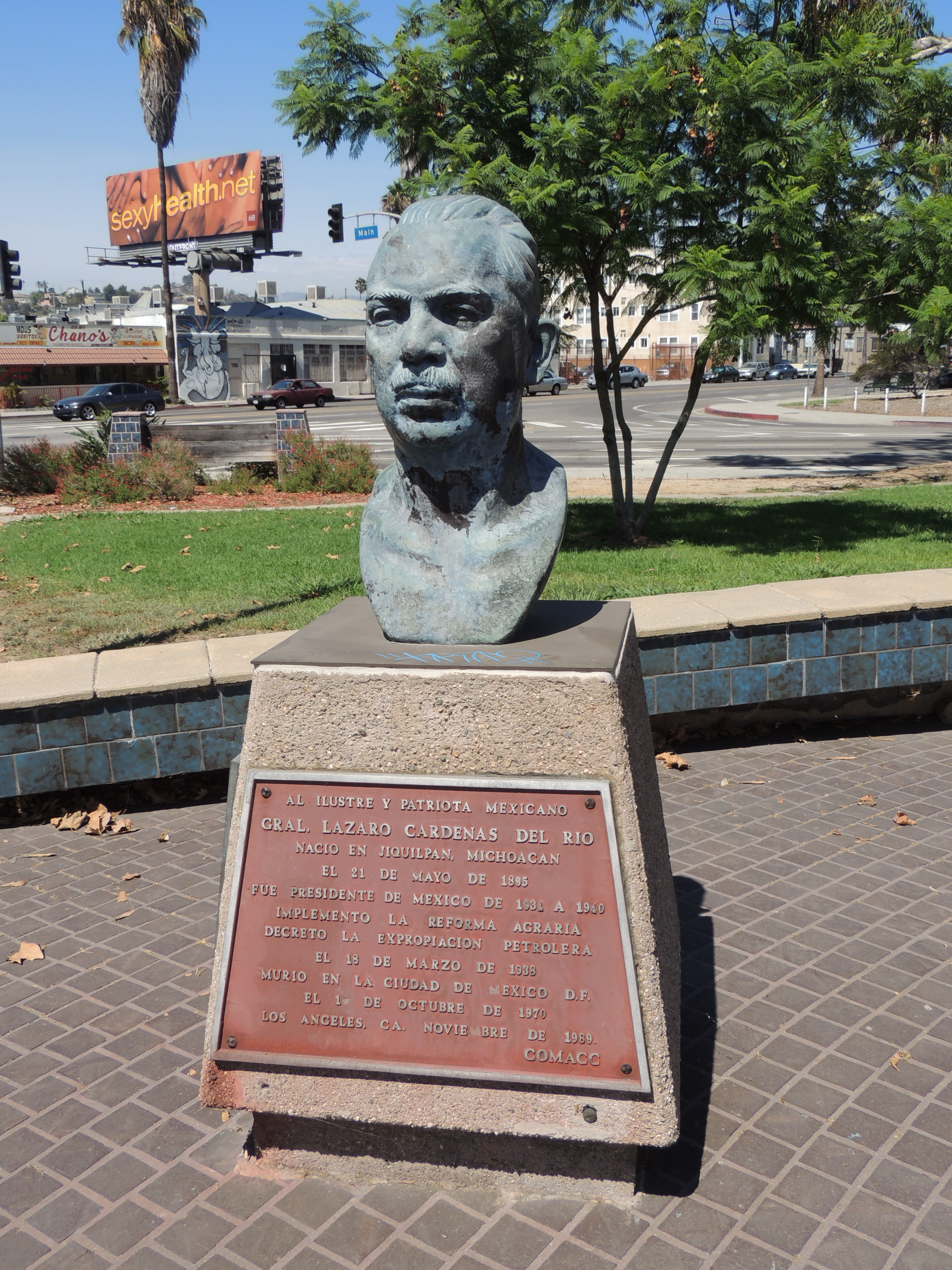
- Artist: Ernesto Tamariz
- Year: 1970
- Subject: Lázaro Cárdenas
- Location: El Parque de México, Lincoln Park, Los Angeles, California, U.S.; 34.065707°N 118.206013°W

The Bust of Lázaro Cárdenas is a bronze sculpture honoring Mexican President Lázaro Cárdenas (1895–1970), located at El Parque de México, in Lincoln Park, in Los Angeles, California, United States.

== History ==
The statue was sculpted by Mexican artist Ernesto Tamariz in 1970. The monument was donated to the city of Los Angeles by the Comité Mexicano de Apoyo a Cuauhtémoc Cárdenas (Spanish for the "Mexican Committee to Support Cuauhtémoc Cárdenas") and erected in November 1989 at El Parque de México, a section of LA's Lincoln Park devoted to Mexican historical figures.

== Inscription ==
The Spanish inscription on the monument reads:

AL ILUSTRE Y PATRIOTA MEXICANO

GRAL. LÁZARO CÁRDENAS DEL RÍO
NACIÓ EL 21 DE MAYO DE 1895
FUE PRESIDENTE DE MÉXICO DE 1934 A 1940
IMPLEMENTÓ LA REFORMA AGRARIA
DECRETÓ LA EXPROPIACIÓN PETROLERA
EL 18 DE MARZO DE 1938
MURIÓ EN LA CIUDAD DE MÉXICO D.F. EL 1 DE OCTUBRE DE 1970
LOS ÁNGELES, CA. NOVIEMBRE DE 1989. COMACC
