= Lincoln Park (Los Angeles) =

Park in Los Angeles' Lincoln Heights Neighborhood

Coordinates: 34°04′00″N 118°12′04″W

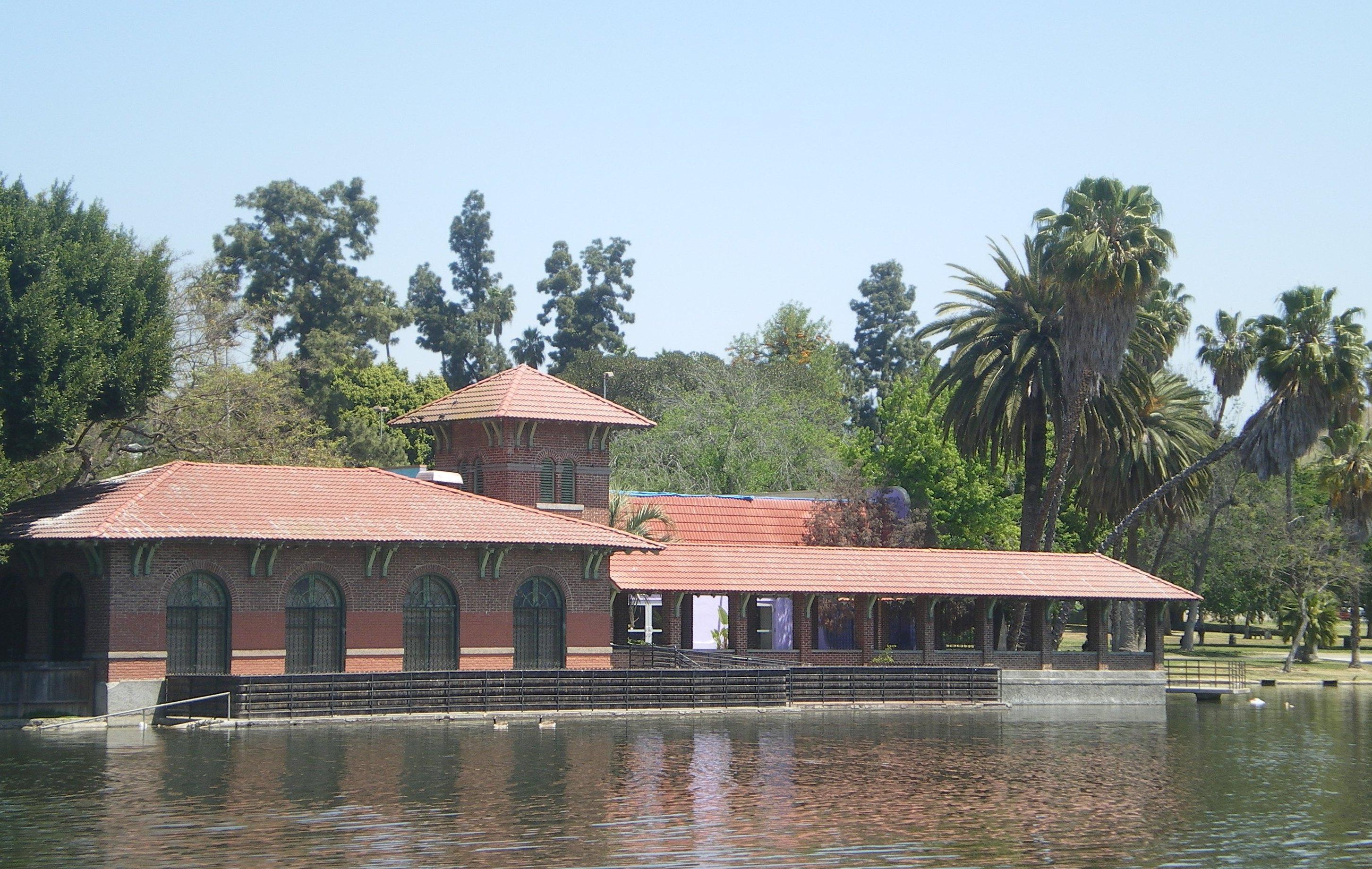
- Lincoln Park Lake

- Location within the Los Angeles metropolitan area Location within California Location within the United States
- Type: Urban park
- Location: Los Angeles, California, United States
- Created: 1881 + A New Location!
- Status: Open all year

Lincoln Park in Los Angeles, California, was originally created by the City of Los Angeles in 1881 from land donated by John Strother Griffin. It was one of Los Angeles's first parks. It was originally called East Los Angeles Park, then Eastlake Park in 1901. On May 19, 1917, the park was renamed Lincoln Park after Abraham Lincoln High School.

== Background ==
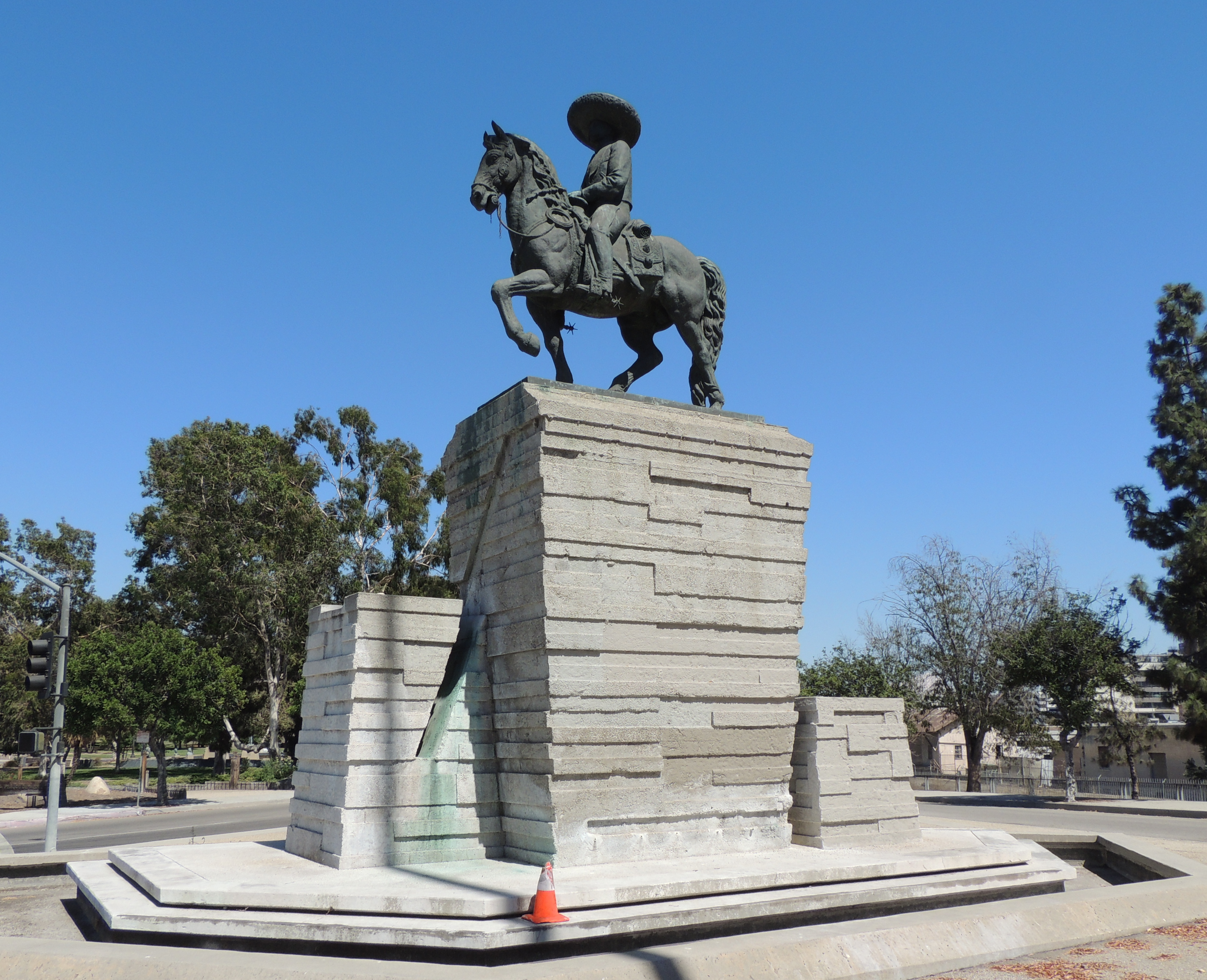
The Equestrian statue of Emiliano Zapata in El Parque de México.

The park contains a large lake (Lincoln Park Lake, originally East Lake), a recreation center, a senior center, a playground, picnic tables, skatepark and ball fields.

The park is located at the intersection of Valley Boulevard and Mission Road and is served by Metro lines 76, 78, 79, and 378.

There was an earlier Lincoln Park in Los Angeles County, just outside the city limits of Los Angeles and just inside the limits of South Pasadena.

== Pop Culture Trivia ==
The Band Linkin Park is named after Lincoln Park. Mike Shinoda recounted how the band (called Hybrid Theory at the time) was trying to come up with a new name. Chester Bennington walked into the studio, having just come from Lincoln Park, and pitched the idea. The final version of the name came while trying to secure the .com domain.

== El Parque de México ==
El Parque de México is a small park to the side of Lincoln Park, separated by a street but considered part of the larger Lincoln Park unit. It hosts a commemorative space honoring historical figures from the history of Mexico, with numerous statues, busts, and monuments located there, including the Equestrian statue of José María Morelos and the Bust of Lázaro Cárdenas.
