= Frank Putnam Flint Fountain =

Monument in Los Angeles, California, U.S.

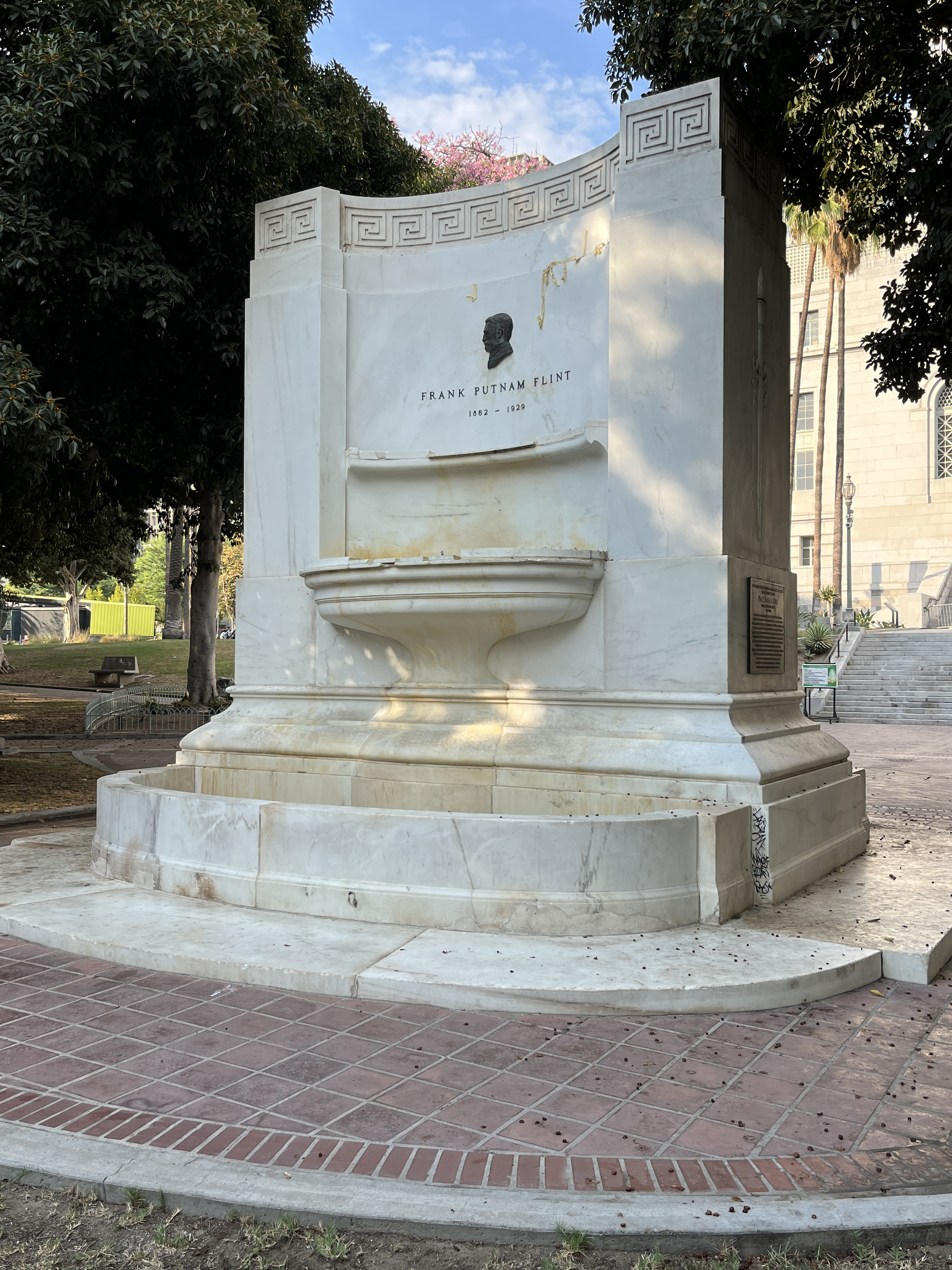
- The monument in 2022
- 34°3′10.3″N 118°14′36.8″W

The Frank Putnam Flint Fountain, also known as the Flint Memorial, is a monument commemorating Frank Putnam Flint, who was a United States Senator from California, in Los Angeles. It is located on the south lawn of Los Angeles City Hall facing 1st Street.
