= Equestrian statue of José María Morelos (Los Angeles) =

1981 monument in California, US

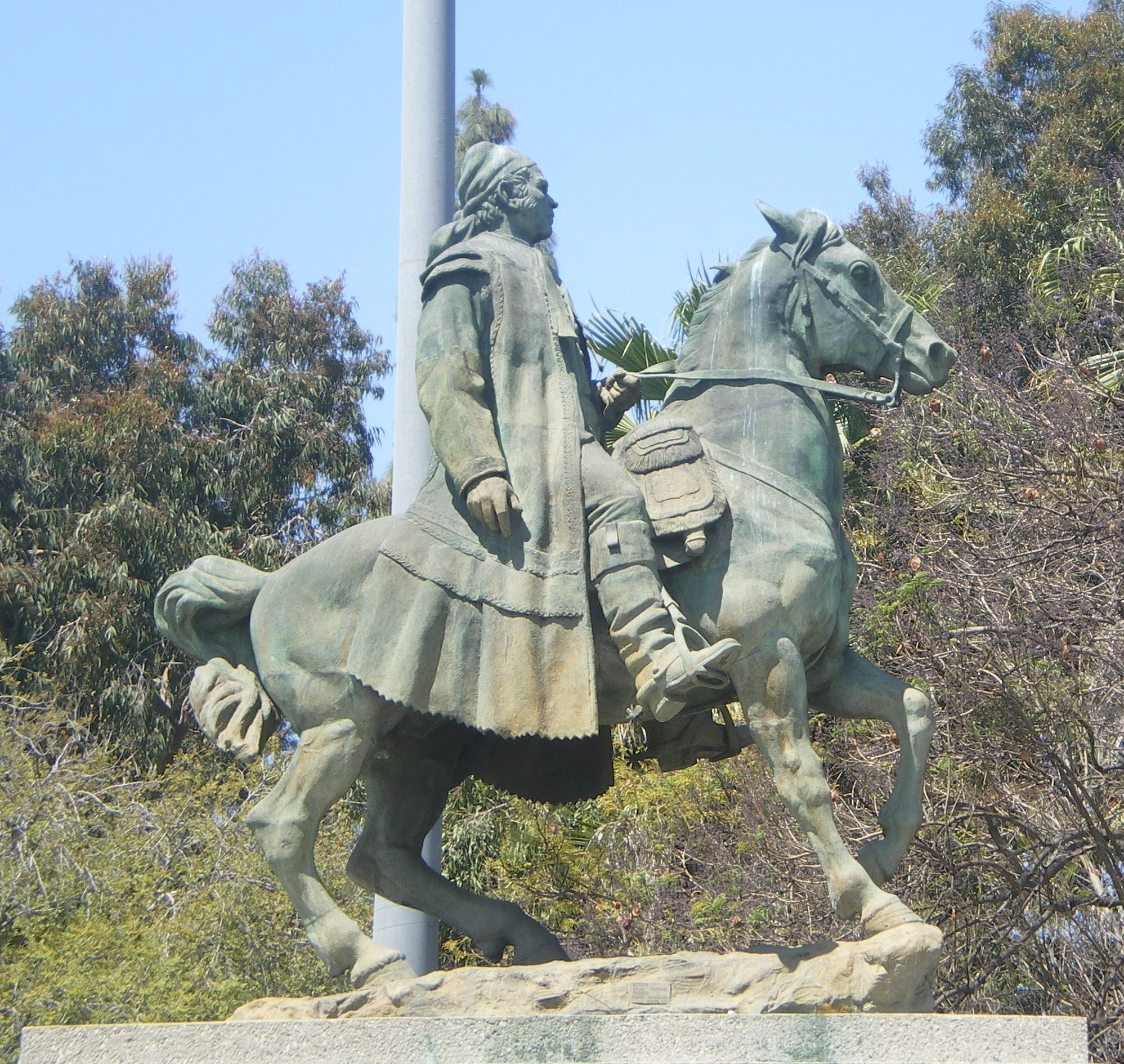
- Artist: Julián Martínez Soto
- Completion date: June 13, 1981
- Subject: José María Morelos
- Location: El Parque de México, Lincoln Park, Los Angeles, California, U.S.; 34°3′56.1″N 118°12′18.6″W

The equestrian statue of José María Morelos, honoring Mexican War of Independence revolutionary José María Morelos, is installed at El Parque de México, located in Lincoln Park, in Los Angeles, California, United States.

== History ==
The statue was sculpted by Mexican-Spanish artist Julián Martínez Soto in 1980 and cast at Manuel Maldonado Foundry, in Mexico City. The monument was donated to the city of Los Angeles by Mexican President José López Portillo and erected on June 13, 1981, at El Parque de México, a section of Los Angeles' Lincoln Park devoted to Mexican historical figures.
