= Heath Satow =

American artist (born 1969)

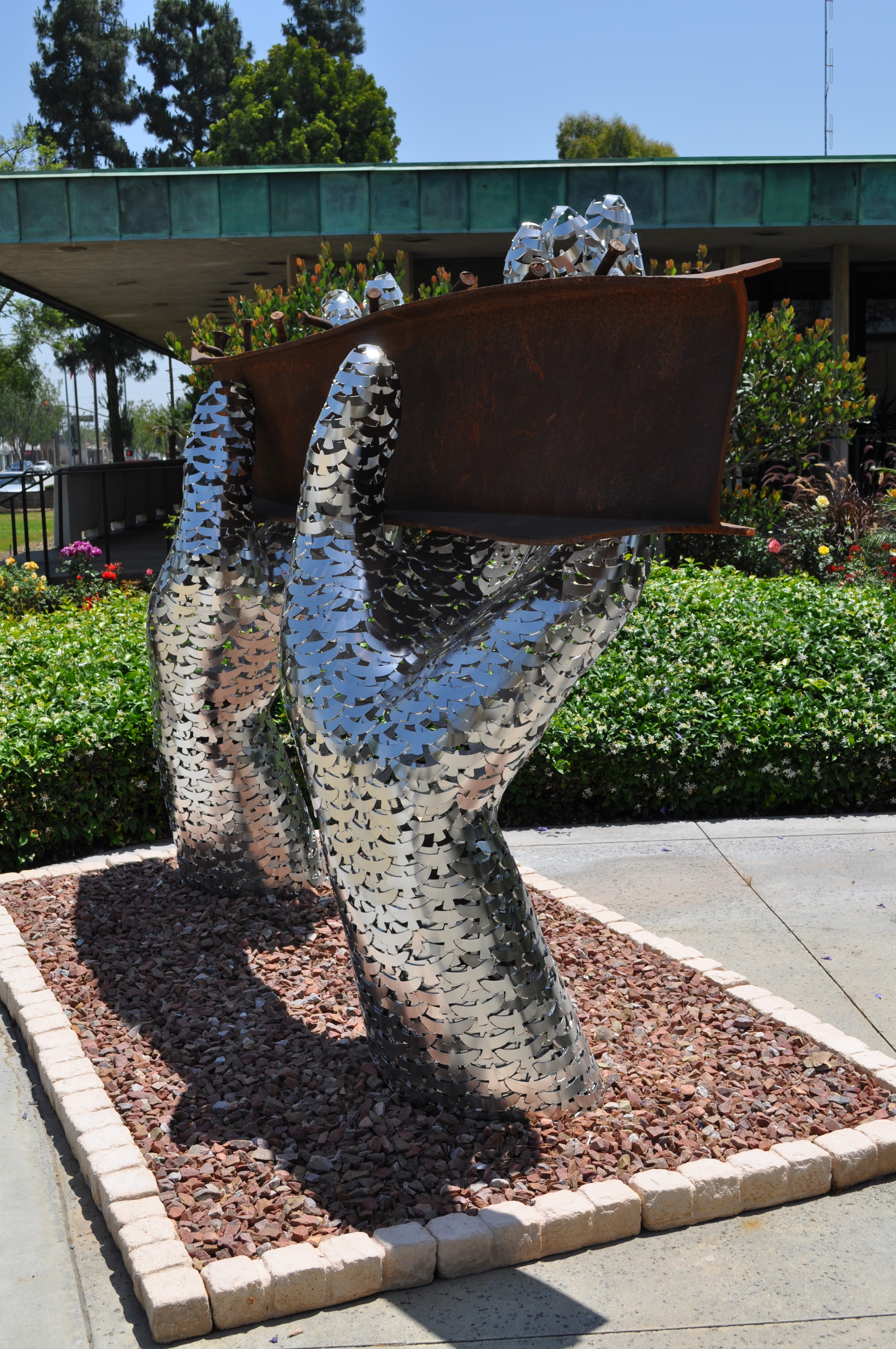
Heath Satow 9/11 Memorial Sculpture

Heath Satow (born February 6, 1969) is an American artist who works primarily in fabricated metals. A particular work of note is his 9/11 Memorial sculpture in Rosemead, California, with "3,000... stainless-steel figures... welded together to create a pair of giant hands lifting a twisted steel beam from New York's World Trade Center."

While attending the School of Design at North Carolina State University, he apprenticed at Clearscapes, an architecture/sculpture firm in Raleigh, North Carolina. Upon graduation in 1991, he was put in charge of the sculpture studio at that firm.

In 1994, Satow left Clearscapes to start his own studio, and had his practice in Los Angeles for 17 years before settling in Ogden, Utah. He has created permanent sculptures in locations around the world including the Denver Zoo, Raleigh–Durham International Airport, and Emirates Global Aluminium.

Satow's Ripple sculpture in Los Angeles was recognized as one of the "most compelling work[s]" of 2012 by Americans for the Arts.
