= Four Arches =

Sculpture in Los Angeles, California, U.S.

- The sculpture in 2022
- Artist: Alexander Calder
- Location: Los Angeles, California, U.S.
- 34°3′11.7″N 118°15′11.8″W

Four Arches is a 63-foot-tall steel sculpture by Alexander Calder, installed in Los Angeles, California. The sculpture was completed in 1973–1974.

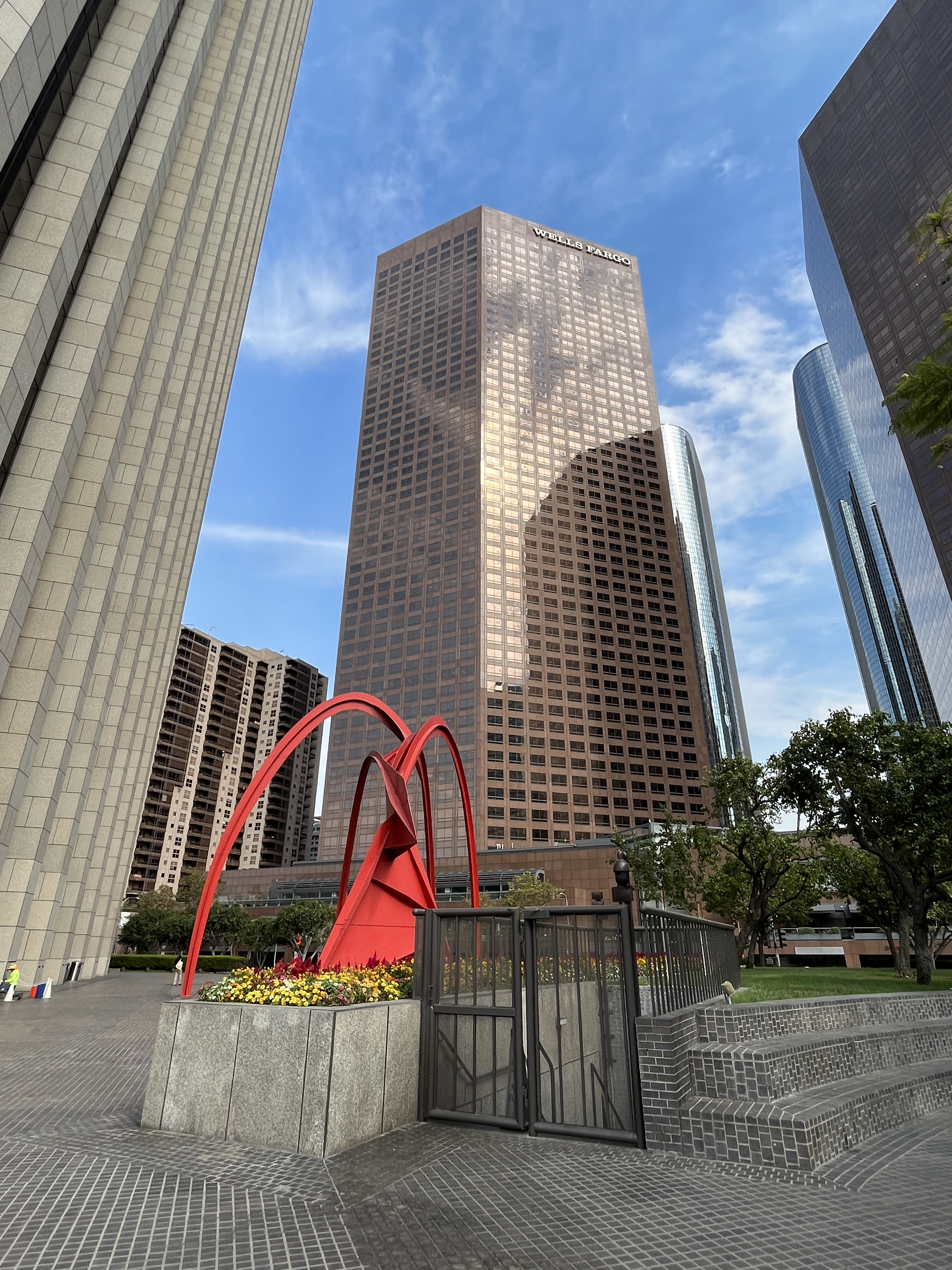

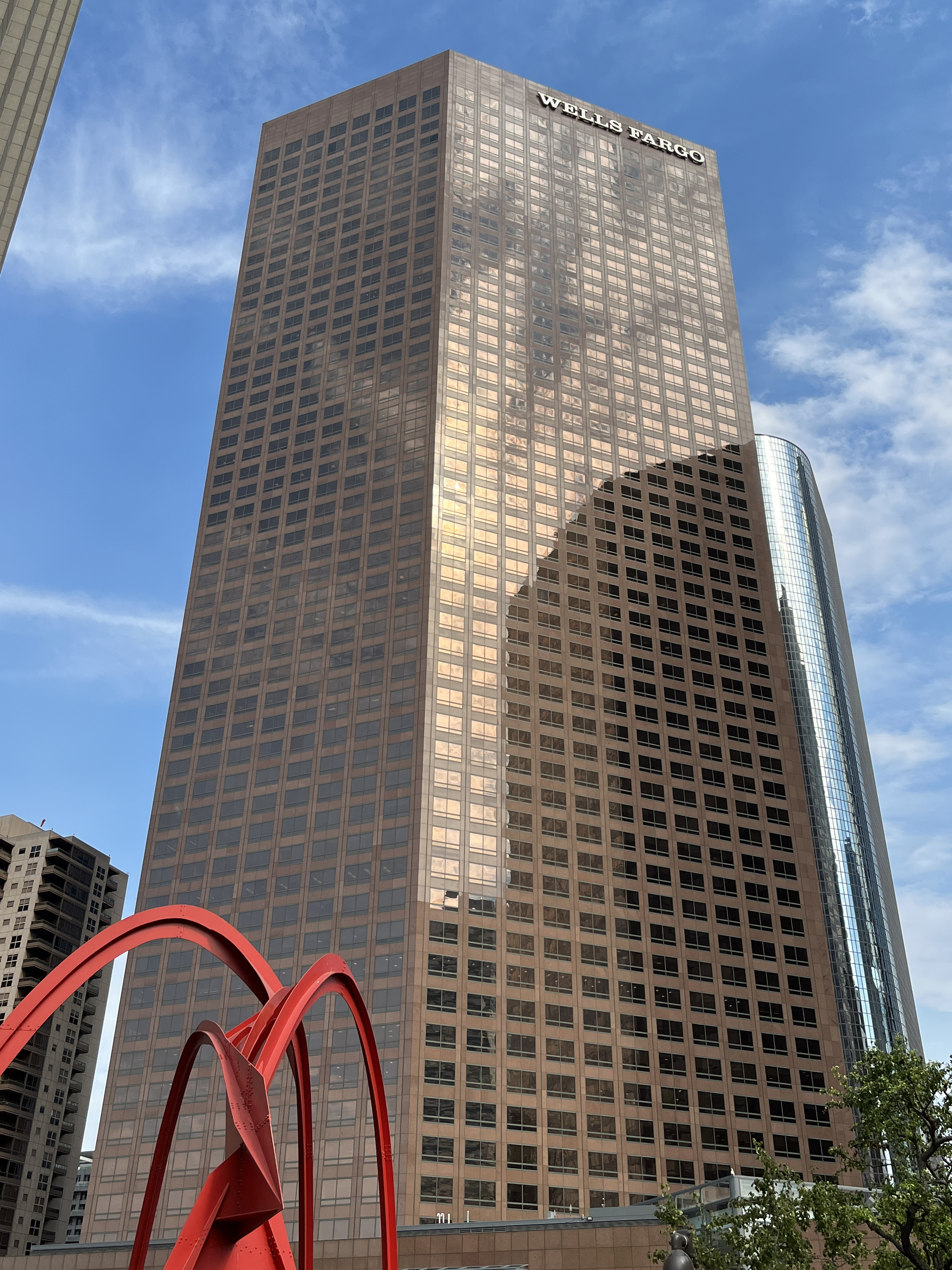

== See also ==
- List of Alexander Calder public works
