= History of Chico, California =

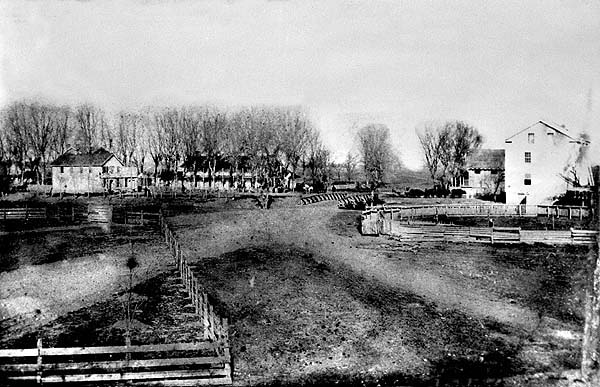
One of the earliest photographs of Chico. Bidwell's store, adobe, and mill are visible looking northwest from near modern-day First and Main streets.

The history of Chico, California, begins with the original inhabitants, the Mechoopda Maidu.

The city of Chico was founded in 1860 by General John Bidwell, a member of one of the first wagon trains to reach California in 1841. The city became incorporated January 8, 1872.

Historian W.H. "Old Hutch" Hutchinson identified five events as the most seminal in Chico history. They were

1. the arrival of John Bidwell in 1850
2. the arrival of the California and Oregon Railroad in 1870
3. the establishment of the Northern Branch of the State Normal School in 1887
4. the purchase of the Sierra Lumber Company by the Diamond Match Company in 1900
5. the development of the Army Air Base which is now the Chico Municipal Airport.

Since then, several seminal events have unfolded in Chico. These include: the construction and relocation of Highway 99E through town in the early sixties; Playboy Magazine naming Chico State the number one party school in the nation in 1987; and the establishment of a Green Line on the western city limits as protection of agricultural lands.

== 19th century ==
Chico was founded by General John Bidwell, a member of one of the first wagon trains to reach California in 1843. Bidwell first came to the area in that same year as an employee of John Sutter. In 1844, William Dickey was granted Rancho Arroyo Chico by Mexican Governor Manuel Micheltorena. In two separate purchases in 1849 and 1851, Bidwell acquired the Rancho Arroyo Chico. He filed a claim for the land with the Public Land Commission in 1852, and the claim was confirmed the next year. After a subsequent legal challenge, the claim was confirmed by the US District Court for the Northern District in 1855, and eventually by the US Supreme Court. The title patent was signed by President James Buchanan in 1860.

A treaty of "peace and friendship" was signed on September 18, 1853, between the Mechoopda, and other tribes of the area near Bidwell's Ranch; Indians at Reading's Ranch at Colusa; and tribes along the Consumnes and Yuba rivers. United States Indian Agent O. M. Wozencraft represented the U.S. government at Bidwell's Ranch.

The city of Chico was founded in 1860 by General John Bidwell. That year, Bidwell requested the county send a surveyor to lay out the city street grid.

Chico was the starting point of the Koncow Trail of Tears also called the Nome Cult Trail. On August 28, 1863, all Konkow Maidu were to be at the Bidwell Ranch to be taken to the Round Valley Reservation at Covelo in Mendocino County. Any Indians remaining in the area were to be shot. 435 Maidu were rounded up and marched under guard west out of the Sacramento Valley and through to the Coastal Range. 461 Indians started the trek, 277 finished. They reached Round Valley on September 18, 1863.

The city became incorporated January 8, 1872. In that year the first Chico Board of Trustees was established. This body was the predecessor of the modern Chico City Council. The first municipal election was February 5, 1872 with 217 votes cast. The first City Board of Trustees comprised G.W. Dorn, C.L. Pond, B.F. Allen, W.K. Springer, and John Kempf. Dorn was named as the first president of the board of trustees. Municipal elections were annual and the term for a trustee was two years. However, the first trustees had to draw lots to determine who would serve for a one-, two- or three-year term. This was to provide that there would only be either two or three seats up for election in any given year henceforth.

The Butte Flume and Lumber Company built a flume from Butte Meadows down Big Chico Creek in 1872, completing it in 1874. This flume would supply the Diamond Match Company with lumber for its operations.

In 1877, anti-Chinese riots erupted.

In 1887, the California legislature established the Northern Branch of the State Normal School of California. Chico was chosen as its site, and Bidwell donated land from his cherry orchard for this purpose. This school would come to be called the Chico Normal School, Chico State College, and finally California State University, Chico.

Chico was the northern terminus of the Sacramento Northern Railroad, an electrified railway which extended south to Sacramento and Oakland in the San Francisco Bay Area.

Originally the City Board of Trustees was elected at-large, with each trustee standing for election by the entire electorate of the city, rather than just by a district. On April 12, 1897, the city had its first election under the ward system. The polling places for each ward were: First Ward - City Hall, Second Ward - Bruce and Young Building, Third Ward - Western Hose House, and Fourth Ward - Chico Hotel at the Junction.

Beginning in 1899, municipal elections would be only held every two years.

In 1899, Mayor J. Ellis Rodley, was sentenced to 12 years in prison after being found guilty of perjury in the witnessing of a forged will offered for probate. He was granted parole in 1906.

== 20th century ==
On July 10, 1905, Annie Bidwell signed a grant deed donating 1,902.88 acres (7.7007 km^{2}) to the people of Chico for a public park. These initial acres were expanded upon several times over the years, resulting in the creation of Bidwell Park, one of the largest municipal parks in the nation.

In 1907, municipal elections were changed so that one trustee would be elected from each ward to serve concurrent four-year terms.

In 1917 the first parade that would later come to be called the Pioneer Day Parade was held on the downtown streets as a celebration of Senior Day. This tradition would continue as a celebration of local heritage under various names on the first Saturday in May each year until 1990.

On June 4, 1921, an election was held to choose a "board of freeholders" charged with framing a city charter.

In 1923, under the new charter, the board of trustees was replaced by the city council. The ward system was also abolished and at-large election of city leaders was reinstated.

In 1933, there was a municipal election which included a recall attempt on three councilmembers. The recall was defeated.

During WWII the Chico Army Air Field was used to train fighter and bomber pilots. It was also home of the 555th Parachute Infantry Battalion.

On December 6–7, 1958, Operation Chico evacuated 1000 people from Solano County to Chico for the weekend as a civil defense exercise.

In the late 1950s and early 1960s, the city wrestled with the controversial issue of creating a bypass for State Route 99 through Bidwell Park. The viaduct was built 1963–65.

On May 2, 1961, the City Charter was amended to increase the size of the Chico City Council from five to seven members.

On July 31, 1961, an aircraft hijacking occurred at the Chico Municipal Airport. Two men were critically wounded and the hijacker was sentenced to more than 30 years in prison.

On May 24, 1962, two explosions destroyed a Titan I missile at the 851st Strategic Missile Squadron complex located north of the Chico Municipal Airport between Keefer Road and Cohasset Road. An oxygen valve had stuck open and a blocked vent caused the gas to build up until a spark ignited it. However, the potentially catastrophic event was overshadowed in the national news by the launch of Scott Carpenter into space. On June 6, trouble again struck as a flash fire in another silo killed a worker.

On April 22, 1970, students celebrating the first Earth Day on the Chico State campus pushed a car into West First Street (which was then State Route 32) blocking traffic. The street was closed temporarily for safety. The incident escalated into a demonstration that lasted into the night. The protesters were arrested on conspiracy charges which were later dropped. The street re-opened the next day, however it was permanently closed over the segment running through campus later that year.

On July 21, 1982, the Butte County Board of Supervisors approved an amendment to the 1979 Butte County Land Use Element of the Butte County General Plan with the purpose of preserving agricultural land. This amendment established a "Green Line" on the west side of Chico beyond which urban development would be restricted. This line is responsible for the continued existence of working orchards relatively close to the core of the growing city.

In 1987 Playboy Magazine named Chico State the "Number One Party School" in the nation. University President Robin Wilson met with city officials including City Manager Fred Davis, and Police Chief, John Bullerjahn with the goal of ending the reputation by ending the parties with police force. On April 25, 1987, police riots broke out during the Pioneer Days celebration. President Wilson announced an end to the 70-year-old tradition saying, he took Pioneer Days "out back and shot it in the head." The tradition was revived in 1996 and has continued to this day.

In 1996, the Olympic Torch arrived in Chico at the Amtrak station. The torch was carried through the closed streets with thousands of Chicoans celebrating along the path.

In 1996 the recently re-elected council member Ted Hubert died prior to being re-sworn in, and more significantly, before the selection of mayor had occurred. The evenly, and deeply divided council stalemated on the selection. This resulted in a rotating Mayor Pro Tempore system for about six months. The remaining six council members each took turns serving as meeting chair until they appointed Bill Johnston to fill the council vacancy, and Rick Keene mayor.

In the years while the Pioneer Days celebration was canceled (1990-1996), the Halloween and St. Patrick's Day celebrations grew into much larger events. These holidays had always enjoyed a high rate of participation in Chico due to its young population. However, following the loss of Pioneer Days, St. Patrick's Day and Halloween grew in popularity to compensate. Mutual aid was invoked by police each year for several years and a campaign launched by city government to combat the increase in alcohol-related arrests.

== 21st century ==
In 2000 and 2001, the city closed downtown streets to accommodate the thousands of Halloween revelers. However, in 2002 the streets were no longer closed. The City even conducted a TV ad campaign telling people not to come downtown for Halloween. In response to the incidence of thrown bottles, and broken glass, the city council has established a "Glass Free Zone" largely contiguous with the downtown and the South Campus Neighborhood. The Council activates the "Glass Free Zone" every Halloween and St. Patrick's Day and from time to time at the request of the police when they believe there will be a large gathering of revelers. Most recently, César Chávez Day was added to the growing list of holidays requiring such a response.

In 1998, the tower supporting the famous Diamond on top of the Senator Theatre at Fifth and Main was discovered to be leaning. It was determined to be at risk of collapse, and was removed. The tower was refurbished and put back in place in 2005.

In 2003, a branch from one of the majestic Siberian elm trees planted in 1873 by John Bidwell in City Plaza fell and hit a person sitting on a bench. The incident prompted the removal of the trees, some of which had rotting roots. The city embarked on a renovation of City Plaza in 2005, and in November 2006, the newly renovated Chico City Plaza was re-opened.

== See also ==
- List of mayors of Chico, California
- Bibliography of California history
