= George Snook =

American politician

George Sutton Snook

6th and 12th President of the Board of Trustees of Chico, California
- In office 1885–1886
- Preceded by: Charles Ball
- Succeeded by: James Davison
- In office 1892–1894
- Preceded by: Jonas Hoyl
- Succeeded by: Frederick C. Williams

Personal details
- Born: September 1, 1842 Aurora, Indiana
- Died: July 31, 1894 (aged 51) Chico, California
- Spouse: Amanda Jane Sligar Snook (m. September 20, 1870)
- Children: 3
- Occupation: cooper, farmer, lumber sales, livery

Military service
- Allegiance: Union Army
- Rank: Captain, Major
- Unit: Company C of the 12th Indiana Infantry Regiment (May 1861) Company H of the 10th Regiment Indiana Cavalry (March 1862) Chico Guard (November 1880)
- Battles/wars: American Civil War

George Sutton Snook (September 1, 1842 – July 31, 1894) was an American businessman. He was the sixth and twelfth President of the Chico Board of Trustees, the governing body of Chico, California from 1885 to 1886 and from 1892 to 1894.

== Early life ==
Snook was born in Aurora, Indiana, on September 1, 1842, the son of Isaac Snook, a native of Pennsylvania and Elizabeth Sopris Snook. He was educated in Indiana in the trade of coopersmithing. He worked in this trade for three years before the American Civil War erupted.

Snook was eighteen at the outbreak of the American Civil War, and in May 1861, he enlisted in Company C of the 12th Indiana Infantry Regiment. He served for ten months, and reenlisted in Company H of the 10th Regiment Indiana Cavalry under General Wilson. He participated in all the battles engaged by the Western army. He escaped injury, received several promotions, and when discharged at Vicksburg, in August, 1865, was Captain of his company.

== Career ==
Snook went to Illinois for three years where he engaged in farming. In 1868, he came to Chico, California where he was initially employed in the lumber industry. He was then engaged in an express business for seven years. In 1883, he entered into the livery business with a partner. In December 1885, his establishment was destroyed by fire. He then formed a partnership with a Mr. White, continuing in the livery business. In 1889 a Mr. Clark purchased White's interest, and they continued in business until at least 1891.

Snook enlisted in the Chico Guard, a unit of the 5th Brigade of the California Militia on November 10, 1880, as a Sergeant. On December 10, 1883, he reenlisted in the Chico Guard. On April 23, 1886, he, again, reenlisted in the Chico Guard and again on December 10, 1886. He attained the rank of Captain and Aide-de-camp to the Commander of the 5th Brigade on March 7, 1887. He eventually attained the rank of Major of the Fifth Brigade and Brigade Inspector.

He was the sixth and twelfth President of the Chico Board of Trustees, the governing body of Chico, California from 1885 to 1886 and from 1892 to 1894.

== Personal life ==
On September 20, 1870, he was married to Miss Amanda Jane Sliger, a native of Missouri, who came to California in her girlhood. The same year, he purchased a home on the corner of Wall and Fourth streets.

Snook was a First Commander of the Post, Grand Army of the Republic. He was a member of the Military Order of the Loyal Legion of the United States, the Independent Order of Odd Fellows, the Ancient Order of United Workmen, the Improved Order of Red Men, and the Chico Volunteer Fire Department.

He died on July 31, 1894, in Chico, California. He is buried in the Chico Cemetery.

Preceded by Charles Ball	President of the Board of Trustees of Chico, California; 1885–1886	Succeeded by James Davison
Preceded by Jonas Hoyl	President of the Board of Trustees of Chico, California; 1892–1894	Succeeded by Frederick C. Williams
