= Frederick C. Williams =

Frederick Claudius Williams
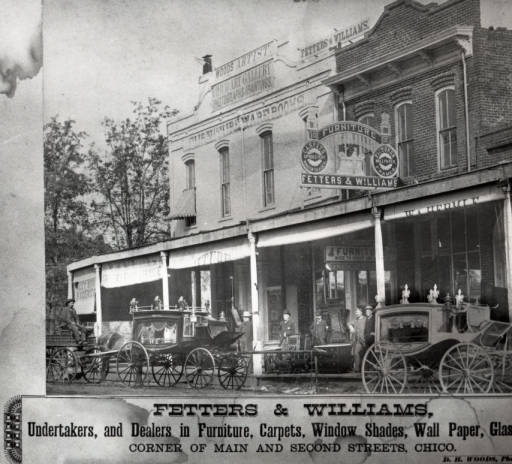
- Fetters and Williams at the corner of Second and Main in Chico (1885)

13th President of the Board of Trustees of Chico, California
- In office 1895–1897
- Preceded by: George Snook
- Succeeded by: J. Ellis Rodley

Personal details
- Born: September 10, 1855 Earlville, Illinois
- Died: March 6, 1940 (aged 84) Butte County, California
- Resting place: Honcut Cemetery, Honcut City, California
- Party: Republican
- Spouse: Estella Gertrude Hand (December 23, 1886)
- Occupation: furniture and carpet sales, undertaker and apiarist

Frederick Claudius Williams (September 10, 1855 – March 6, 1940) was an American orchardist, beekeeper, and funeral director. He was the thirteenth President of the Chico Board of Trustees, the governing body of Chico, California from 1895 to 1897.

He operated Fetters and Williams, a business in Chico. They were undertakers, dealers in furniture, carpets, window shades, wallpaper, and glass. The business was located at the southeast corner of Main Street and East 2nd Streets.

He was born in Earlville, Illinois in September 1855, the son of William Williams and Rachel Davis.

He came to California in 1876, and worked on a farm in Marysville. He came to Chico in 1878. He partnered with Charles Fetters and opened Fetters and Williams. In 1906, Williams bought out Mr. Fetters and continued the business under the same name.

Williams was also interested in horticulture, and owned several orchards of almonds and prunes on his ranch near Lone Pine Avenue. He was the first person in Butte County to operate apiaries. His operation grew to six apiaries containing nearly eight hundred colonies of bees, becoming the largest exporter of honey in the area.

== Associations ==
- Member, Independent Order of Odd Fellows
- Member, Benevolent and Protective Order of Elks
- Member, State Funeral Directors’ Association
- Director, Butte County Fair Association

Preceded by George Snook	President of the Board of Trustees of Chico, California; 1895–1897	Succeeded by J. Ellis Rodley
