= J. Ellis Rodley =

American physician

John Ellis Rodley

14th President of the Board of Trustees of Chico, California
- In office 1897–1899
- Preceded by: Frederick C. Williams
- Succeeded by: Oliver L. Clark

Personal details
- Born: February 1, 1852 Galashiels, Selkirkshire, Scotland St. Louis, Missouri, Chico, California
- Died: December 2, 1919 (aged 67) Butte County, California
- Resting place: Chico Cemetery, Chico, California
- Party: Republican
- Spouse: Mary Elizabeth Rodley (m. April 24, 1893)
- Children: 3
- Education: Missouri Medical College (1881)
- Occupation: Physician, surgeon

John Ellis Rodley (February 2, 1852 – December 2, 1919) was the fourteenth President of the Chico Board of Trustees, the governing body of Chico, California from 1897 to 1899.

He was born February 2, 1852, in Galashiels, Selkirkshire, Scotland, the son of Edward Rodley and Sarah Ellis. His father Edward was a manufacturer of wool. His mother Sarah died in Scotland. The family emigrated to the United States in about 1868, and settled in Lebanon, Missouri.

Although, he was still very young at the time, John began his study of medicine under Dr. Hugh Falconer in Scotland. He continued his studies in America at Missouri Medical College (also called McDowell Medical College) in St. Louis from where he was graduated in 1881.

He began to practice medicine in Lebanon, where he resided until 1884. He moved to St. Louis, where he continued his practice for four more years, where he was on the Missouri Pacific Hospital, the railroad hospital. He also served as surgeon for the Missouri Pacific Railroad. In 1888, Dr. Rodley left Missouri for California and located in Chico.

In Chico, he practiced medicine, and served on the Chico Board of Trustees, and as its President. He owed four farms, where he raised grains, fruits and nuts.

In 1899, Rodley was sentenced to 12 years in prison after being found guilty of perjury in the witnessing of a forged will offered for probate. He was granted parole in 1906.

Preceded by Frederick C. Williams	President of the Board of Trustees of Chico, California; 1897–1899	Succeeded by Oliver L. Clark
