= List of mayors of Chico, California =

Mayor of Chico
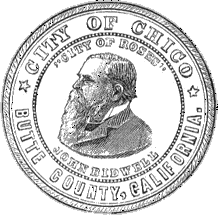
- Seal of Chico

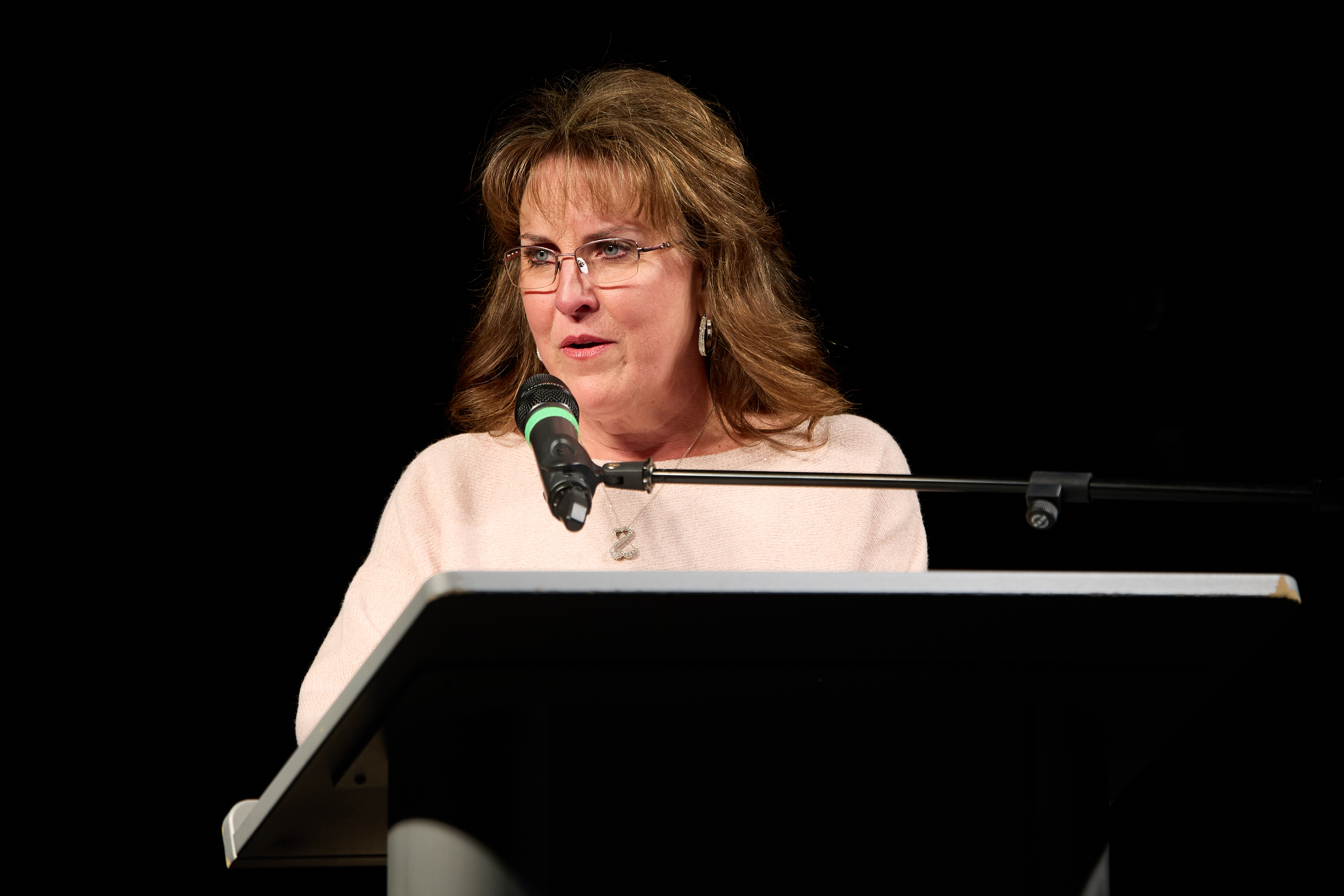
- Incumbent; Kasey Reynolds since December 4, 2024
- Term length: 4 years
- Formation: 1923
- First holder: Clarence Colin Richardson

The Mayor of Chico, California is the chair of the City Council of Chico, California. The city of Chico has a council–manager form of local government. The city council holds its first meeting after the election of new and re-elected council members on the first Tuesday in December of even-numbered years. At this meeting, the mayor is chosen by and from among the members of the Chico City Council. The mayor serves for a term of two years. The office of mayor is a nonpartisan office. In the absence of both the Mayor and Vice Mayor, the Council may choose one of its members to act as Mayor Pro Tempore.

== Presidents of the Board of Trustees (1872–1923) ==
The city became incorporated on January 8, 1872. In that year, the first Chico Board of Trustees was established. This body was the predecessor of the modern Chico City Council, and its president acted as mayor. The first municipal election was February 5, 1872 with 217 votes cast for trustees elected at-large. Municipal elections were annual and the term for a trustee was two years. However, the first trustees had to draw lots to determine who would serve for a one, two or three-year term. This was to provide that there would only be either two or three seats up for election in any given year henceforth. The chair of the board was chosen by and from among the board's members and titled its president.

On April 12, 1897, the city had its first election under the ward system. Beginning in 1899, municipal elections would be only held every two years

Name	Beginning of term	End of term
George W. Dorn	1872	1873
Hiram Batchelder	1873	1876
Charles Ball	1876	1879
Newman Johnson	1879	1882
Charles Ball	1882	1885
George Snook	1885	1886
James Davison	1886	1888
Michael Mery	1888	1889
John Wayland	1889	1890
Michael Mery	1890	1891
Jonas Hoyl	1891	1892
George Snook	1892	1894
Frederick C. Williams	1895	1897
J. Ellis Rodley^{[a]}	1897	1899
Oliver Lovell Clark	1899	1907
William Robbie	1907	1919
Sherman Reynolds	1919	1923

== Mayors from 1923 to 1996 ==
On June 4, 1921, an election was held to choose a Board of Freeholders charged with framing a City Charter. On April 16, 1923, at-large elections were reinstated under the charter. Under the charter, the board of trustees was renamed the Chico City Council, and its chair was titled the Mayor.

Name	Beginning of term	End of term
Clarence Colin Richardson	1923	1927
Archie Robert Waters	1927	1929
Stephen Levi Bainbridge	1929	1933
Othel Kilpatric	1933	1935
John Vaughan	1935	1937
Stephen Levi Bainbridge	1937	1938
Thomas Richards	1938	1939
Frank William Seydel	1939	1941
E.L. Meyers	1941	1943
Earl Bevins	1943	1949
Ted Meriam	1949	1957
Ross Lawler	1961	1963
Harry McGowan	1963	1967
Gordon Casamajor	1967	1971
William Nichols	1971	1973
Eugene Ringel	1973	1975
Ronald Stewart	1975	1977
James Evans	1979	1981
Margaret Worley	1981	1983
Karl Ory	1983	1985
Georgie Willis	1985	1986
Charles Nelson	1986	1988
Shelton Enochs	1988	1990
Mary Andrews	1990	1992
James Owens	1992	1994
Michael McGinnis	1994	1996

== Mayors Pro Tempore (1996–1997) ==
In 1996, the recently re-elected council member and Vice Mayor Ted Hubert died prior to being re-sworn in, and more significantly, before the selection of mayor had occurred. The evenly, and deeply divided council stalemated on the selection. At its first meeting on the first Tuesday in December, they named Ted Hubert as honorary mayor. However, the stalemate resulted in a rotating Mayor Pro Tempore system for about six months. The remaining six council members each took turns serving as meeting chair until they appointed Bill Johnston to fill the council vacancy, and Rick Keene mayor. During that period, the following council members served as Mayor Pro Tempore for about two weeks each:

Name
Rick Keene
David Guzzetti
Kimberly King
Steve Bertagna
Coleen Jarvis
Mary Andrews
Rick Keene
David Guzzetti
Kimberly King
Steve Bertagna
Coleen Jarvis
Mary Andrews
David Guzzetti
Rick Keene
David Guzzetti

== Mayors from 1997 to the present ==
Name	Beginning of term	End of term
Rick Keene	1997	1998
Steve Bertagna	1998	2000
Dan Herbert	2000	2002
Maureen Kirk	2002	2004
Scott Gruendl	2004	2006
Andrew Holcombe	2006	2008
Ann Schwab	2008	2010
Ann Schwab	2010	2012
Mary Goloff	2012	August 6, 2013
Scott Gruendl	August 6, 2013	December 2014
Mark Sorensen	December 2014	December 2016
Sean Morgan	December 2016	December 2018
Randall Stone	December 2018	March 2020
Ann Schwab	March 25, 2020	December 2020
Andrew Coolidge	December 8, 2020	December 4, 2024
Kasey Reynolds	December 4, 2024	Current

== See also ==
- History of Chico, California

== Notes ==
- ^{a} In 1899, Mayor J. Ellis Rodley, was sentenced to 12 years in prison after being found guilty of perjury in the witnessing of a forged will offered for probate. He was granted parole in 1906.
