= Sherman Reynolds =

Sherman Allyn Reynolds

17th President of the Board of Trustees of Chico, California
- In office 1919–1923
- Preceded by: William Robbie
- Succeeded by: Clarence Colin Richardson

Personal details
- Born: December 29, 1878 Hamilton City, (then) Colusa County, California
- Died: April 21, 1958 (aged 79) Chico, California
- Resting place: Chico Cemetery, Chico, California
- Party: Republican
- Spouse: Helen Adelia Davisson Reynolds
- Children: 3
- Education: Woodman's Academy, Chico State Normal School
- Occupation: Rancher

Sherman Allyn Reynolds (December 29, 1878 – April 21, 1958) was the seventeenth and last President of the Chico Board of Trustees, the governing body of Chico, California from 1919 to 1923.

He was born in Hamilton City, (which at the time was a part of Colusa County) the son of Edward Tillotson Reynolds and Frances Elizabeth Barnard Reynolds who were early settlers of Colusa County.

Reynolds attended Woodman's Academy in Chico, and Chico State Normal School, to which he enrolled at the age of seventeen, and continued for two and a half years. He then quit school to work in the fruit and nut business with his father, in 1898, when the firm of E. T. Reynolds and Son was established. Initially, they leased a warehouse, and eventually they bought a warehouse at the corner of First and Cedar Streets in Chico.

In 1902, they built another warehouse, which had a railroad spur adjoining it at First and Cherry Streets. This warehouse still existed into the 21st-century, and was part of the Chico State campus under the same name as "Reynolds Warehouse." By 1915, they were the largest handlers of almonds in the state. Their dried fruit business grew to the capacity of thirty-five hundred tons annually.

Reynolds, with in partnership with others, owned the Cana Land Company, which comprised two hundred acres of fruit and nuts at Cana.

Reynolds married Helen Adelia "Nellie" Davisson, in Suisun, in 1908. She was a Chico Normal School graduate, and school teacher until her marriage.

In 1915, he was elected from the third ward as a trustee of the city. He served as chairman of the commission on fire, light and water. In 1919, he was elected president of the board of trustees.

On June 4, 1921, an election was held to choose a Board of Freeholders charged with framing a City Charter. On April 16, 1923, at-large elections were reinstated under the charter. Under the charter, the board of trustees was renamed the Chico City Council, and its chair was titled the Mayor. Reynolds was the last mayor to be titled "president" of the "board of trustees" before it became the modern Chico City Council.

== Associations ==
- Member, Free and Accepted Masons, Chico Lodge Number 111
- High Priest, Chico Chapter Number 42, Royal Arch Masons
- Member, Chico Commandery, Number 12,
- Knight Templar Inspector, Second Section of District Number 3, Knights Templar
- Member, Josephine Chapter Number 104, Order of the Eastern Star
- Foreman, Engine Company Number 1. Chico Volunteer Fire Department
- Member, Chico Business Men's Association

Preceded by William Robbie	President of the Board of Trustees of Chico, California; 1919–1923	Succeeded by Clarence Colin Richardson
