= John Wayland =

American politician

John Abram Wayland

9th President of the Board of Trustees of Chico, California
- In office 1889–1890
- Preceded by: Michael Mery
- Succeeded by: Michael Mery

Personal details
- Born: 1849 Missouri
- Died: July 6, 1890 (aged 40–41) Butte County, California
- Resting place: Chico Cemetery, Chico, California
- Occupation: druggist, clerk, businessman

John Abram Wayland (1849–1890) was the ninth President of the Chico Board of Trustees, the governing body of Chico, California from 1889 to 1890.

He was born in Missouri in 1849, the son of Dr. Joseph Franklin Wayland, and Emma S. R. McCullough Wayland. He came to Chico with his father, a prominent pharmacist.

Preceded by Michael Mery	President of the Board of Trustees of Chico, California; 1889–1890	Succeeded by Michael Mery
