= Clarion Science Fiction and Fantasy Writers' Workshop =

Workshop for science-fiction and fantasy writing

The Clarion Science Fiction and Fantasy Writers' Workshop is an American six-week workshop for aspiring science fiction and fantasy writers. Originally an outgrowth of Damon Knight's and Kate Wilhelm's Milford Writer's Conference, held at their home in Milford, Pennsylvania, it was founded in 1968 by Robin Scott Wilson at Clarion State College in Pennsylvania. Knight and Wilhelm were among the first teachers at the workshop.

In 1972, the workshop moved to Michigan State University. It moved again, in 2006, to the University of California, San Diego.

In 2015, the Clarion Foundation received an anonymous gift of $100,000 to found an endowment funding the workshop.

The Clarion Workshop events for 2020 and 2021 were cancelled due to the COVID-19 pandemic, and students selected for 2020 attended in 2022.

== Other Clarion Workshops ==
Independently operated workshops which share the Clarion name and follow its founding principles include:

- Clarion West Writers Workshop, founded in Seattle, Washington in 1971 by Vonda N. McIntyre. It has been held annually since 1984.
- Clarion South Writers Workshop was held at Griffith University in Brisbane, Australia. It was founded in 2004 and ran biennially to 2011. In 2009, Clarion South lost its venue, although the workshop was held that year. In 2011, Clarion South organizers revealed that future workshops were "on hold indefinitely".
