= James Davison (California politician) =

American judge and politician

7th President of the Board of Trustees of Chico, California
- In office 1886–1888
- Preceded by: George Snook
- Succeeded by: Michael Mery

Personal details
- Born: 1827 Derry, Ireland
- Died: December 21, 1897 Butte County, California, U.S.
- Resting place: Section 8B, Lot 72, Space 4; Chico Cemetery, Chico, California
- Spouse: Agnes M. Waldron (m. 1857)
- Children: 5

Military service
- Allegiance: United States
- Rank: First Lieutenant, Commander of the Post
- Unit: Company G of the 2nd Ohio Infantry (1846–1848), Company D, and Company C, 4th California Volunteer Infantry (1861)
- Battles/wars: Mexican–American War, American Civil War

James Davison (1827 – December 21, 1897) was the seventh President of the Chico Board of Trustees, the governing body of Chico, California from 1886 to 1888.

== Early life and family ==
James Davison was born in Derry, Ireland in 1827. He came to America at the age of three years, with his father, who worked as a weaver in New Jersey. The family returned to Ireland due to his father's health, as well as the failure of a business in New York to which his father had been in consignment. He was thirteen at the time.

Aged 19, in 1846, James returned to America. He enlisted in Company G of the 2nd Ohio Infantry. He served under General Winfield Scott, in the Mexican–American War. After the war, the discovery of gold had become known, and he set out for California.

== Life in California ==
Upon arrival, Davison engaged in mining for several years. He first mined near Nevada City and afterward on the Trinity River. A day's work gave him as much as $100, and over three years he saved $6,000.

After quitting the mines, he engaged in the drug business at Weaverville, with his brother. There, he was also post office clerk under the administration of President James Buchanan. In 1857 he moved to Rabbit Creek (now La Porte), and opened a drug store. He was in business until the outbreak of the American Civil War.

In 1857, Davison married Agnes M. Waldron, a native of Pennsylvania; the couple had five children.

In 1861, Davison enlisted in Company D, 4th California Volunteer Infantry. He was appointed Second Lieutenant, Assistant Quartermaster and Assistant Commissary, and was Commander of the Post at Fort YamHill, Oregon. After this he was promoted to First Lieutenant, Company C, same regiment, serving in Arizona, from where he and his company were sent to Camp Cady, until the close of the war. Having received his discharge he returned to San Francisco and worked in publishing the New Age, which he continued one year. Then he became a teacher for six months. From there he went to Colusa County and took possession of 160 acres of government land. In 1870 he came to Butte County.

He was elected to the office of City Trustee of Chico and served three years, being president of the board two years of that time. In 1890, he was Justice of the Peace.

== Associations ==
- 32nd degree Scottish Rite Mason
- Secretary of the Masonic Lodge
- Financial Reporter, Knights of Honor
- Member, I. O. O. F.

Preceded by George Snook	President of the Board of Trustees of Chico, California; 1886–1888	Succeeded by Michael Mery
