= Oliver L. Clark =

American politician

Oliver Lovell Clark

15th President of the Board of Trustees of Chico, California
- In office 1899–1907
- Preceded by: J. Ellis Rodley
- Succeeded by: William Robbie

Personal details
- Born: Oliver Lovell Clark; February 1836 Vermont
- Died: May 12, 1908 (aged 72) Chico, California
- Resting place: Chico Cemetery, Chico, California
- Spouse: Sarah E. Clark
- Children: 3
- Occupation: Farmer, mayor

Oliver Lovell Clark (February 1836 – May 12, 1908) was the fifteenth President of the Chico Board of Trustees, the governing body of Chico, California from 1899 to 1907.

He was born in Vermont, the son of Willam C. and Mary Clark.

In 1882, he was a member of the board of directors of the Upper Sacramento Agricultural Society.

In 1901, he was a delegate to the California Chinese Exclusion Convention.

In 1902, he was a delegate to the League of Municipalities of California.

== Associations ==
- Member, Royal Arch Masons

| Preceded by J. Ellis Rodley | President of the Board of Trustees of Chico, California; 1899–1907 | Succeeded by William Robbie |
