= Jonas Hoyl =

American politician

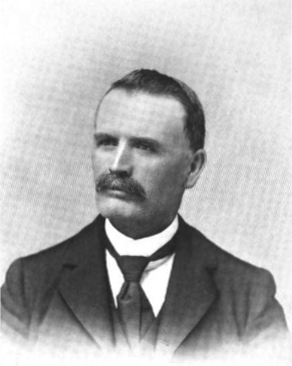

11th President of the Board of Trustees of Chico, California
- In office 1891–1892
- Preceded by: Michael Mery
- Succeeded by: George Snook

Personal details
- Born: Jonas Marion Hoyl; March 3, 1834 McMinn County, Tennessee
- Died: October 25, 1906 (aged 72) Chico, California
- Resting place: Chico Cemetery, Chico, California
- Party: Democratic
- Spouse(s): Elizabeth P. Daugherty (m. November 21, 1858 Tehama County, d. 1865), Sarah Jane Henshaw (m. 1868), Annie M. Whitesides Hoyl (m. 1897)
- Children: 3
- Occupation: horse and cattle, warehouse superintendent

Military service
- Battles/wars: American Civil War

Jonas Marion Hoyl (March 3, 1834 – October 25, 1906) was the eleventh President of the Chico Board of Trustees, the governing body of Chico, California from 1891 to 1892. He also served on the Butte County Board of Supervisors from 1876 to 1878.

Jonas was born March 3, 1834, in McMinn County, Tennessee, the son of Peter V. Hoyl and Mary Carlock. He was educated in Greenfield, Missouri.

He was engaged in the horse and cattle trade for two years in Missouri before coming to California. At age 23, he crossed the plains with a drove of cattle and arrived at Missouri Bend, on the Sacramento River, in 1857. He settled on land on Pine Creek, thirteen miles north of Chico, and engaged in farming and stock raising.

In 1858, Hoyl married Elizabeth P. Daugherty, a native of Arkansas. The marriage lasted until her death in 1865. Jonas and Elizabeth had three daughters, Mary, Laura and Sadie. Laura died at the age of seven. After remaining on the farm several years, Hoyl moved to Chico, purchased lots and built a house on Wall Street between West Second and West Third Streets.

In 1868, he married Sarah Jane Henshaw, a Virginia native, who was raised in Missouri. In 1875, he was elected a member of the Butte County Board of Supervisors, and served from 1876 to 1878. He was also elected as a trustee of the school board and in 1877, was chosen to fill an unexpired term of a member of the city council. He was elected to a complete term in 1888 and served until 1892 becoming president of the council his last year in office.

In 1897, he married Annie M. Whitesides.

He is buried in the Chico Cemetery.

| Preceded by Michael Mery | President of the Board of Trustees of Chico, California; 1891–1892 | Succeeded by George Snook |
