= Michael Mery =

American politician in California (1851–1927)

Michael Lawrence Mery

8th and 10th President of the Board of Trustees of Chico, California
- In office 1888–1889
- Preceded by: James Davison
- Succeeded by: John Wayland
- In office 1890–1891
- Preceded by: John Wayland
- Succeeded by: Jonas Hoyl

Personal details
- Born: April 4, 1851 Baden-Baden, Grand Duchy of Baden
- Died: December 6, 1927 (aged 76) Butte County, California
- Resting place: Chico Cemetery, Chico, California
- Party: Republican
- Spouse: Sarah Seaward (m. March 14, 1874)
- Children: 6
- Occupation: machinist

Michael Lawrence Mery (April 4, 1851 – December 6, 1927) was the eighth and tenth President of the Chico Board of Trustees, the governing body of Chico, California from 1888 to 1889 and from 1890 to 1891. He was the proprietor of the Chico Iron Foundry.

== Early life and family ==
He was born in the Grand Duchy of Baden on April 4, 1851, the son of Jacob Mery. His family emigrated to the United States in 1854, when he was three years old. The family made it as far west as Toledo, Ohio, where Jacob had begun to establish a residence, but died only three months after arriving, and his wife died a week later. The family with seven sons, and one daughter, with Michael as the youngest were orphaned.

In 1865 Mery went to Detroit, and learned to be a machinist. After four years in Detroit, he traveled through the Mississippi Valley, including to Louisville, Kentucky, New Albany, Indiana. He landed engineering jobs in New Orleans, and Rockport, Texas.

In the spring of 1870, he returned to St. Louis and worked constructing city water works. From there he went to Cairo, Illinois, where he worked in an iron foundry. He also worked for a while as a machinist in Houston, Texas, and then returned to New Orleans, to enter the machine shops of the New Orleans and Jackson Railway. This prompted a return to St. Louis in 1871. He went to East St. Louis, Illinois to supervise the Ohio and Mississippi machine shop. It was from there he emigrated to California.

== Life in California ==
Upon arriving in California in 1872, he was immediately hired by the Marysville Foundry, in Marysville, to supervise their expanding operation. The next year, he went to Lake Tahoe, where he was an engineer on steamboat Emerald.

Mery was married March 14, 1874, to Sarah Seaward, a native of New York, who grew up in Marysville.

He came to Chico on January 10, 1875, and with his brother-in-law, J.O. Rusby as his partner, founded the Chico Iron Works under the business name of Rusby & Mery. It was the first iron foundry in Butte County. The business grew and in January 1882, he bought out his partner, but only a month later, the business was destroyed by fire. Although he carried little insurance, he recovered quickly, and rebuilt a larger foundry and machine-shop where he did repair work, and made store fronts, barley crushers, steam engines, threshers and traction engines. He did almost all of the iron work to be done in Northern California at the time, including work for the ten saw mills which became the Sierra Lumber Company, and he continued to serve the mills after they were absorbed by the Diamond Match Company. He was also the inventor of the Mery double-acting gas engine, which was awarded first prize at the California State Fair. In addition, he also built his own automobile.

Eventually, he also purchased a ranch where he planted French prunes, Bartlett pears.

He was active in the political affairs of Butte County, and was for some time chairman of the Butte County Republican Central Committee.

He held the office of city trustee for six years; and was chairman of the board from 1888 to 1889 and from 1890 to 1891.

In 1900, Mery took a trip to Nome, Alaska, when there was placer mining on the beach at that town. He took four plants with him, one being a self-propelling dredger that could go up the stream. All this was packed with definite directions as to where it was to be unloaded; but the crew disobeyed orders and went on to the mouth of the Yukon River with the machinery in the hold. At length the entire consignment was landed; but when it was set up and put in operation, it developed that too much of the earth and gravel would have to be disposed of, and that the yield of gold was not enough to make it pay.

== Associations ==
- Member, Chico Volunteer Fire Department
- Member, Benevolent and Protective Order of Elks
- Member, Independent Order of Odd Fellows

Preceded by James Davison	President of the Board of Trustees of Chico, California; 1888–1889	Succeeded by John Wayland
Preceded by John Wayland	President of the Board of Trustees of Chico, California; 1890–1891	Succeeded by Jonas Hoyl
