= Newman Johnson =

American politician

4th President of the Board of Trustees of Chico, California
- In office 1879–1882
- Preceded by: Charles Ball
- Succeeded by: Charles Ball

Personal details
- Born: June 8, 1828 Haverhill, Massachusetts, US
- Died: December 17, 1900 (aged 72) Butte County, California, US
- Resting place: Chico Cemetery, Chico, California, US
- Party: Republican
- Spouse: Amelia H. Diffenderffer
- Children: 7
- Occupation: farmer, businessman, fireman, grocer, hotelier

Newman Johnson (June 8, 1828 – December 17, 1900) was the fourth President of the Chico Board of Trustees, the governing body of Chico, California from 1879 to 1882.

== Early life and family ==
He was born June 3, 1829, in Haverhill, Massachusetts, the son of Joseph Johnson and Mary Chase. He was educated in Haverhill in the trade of shoe-making.

== Life in California ==
He came to California via the Central American isthmus in 1851, at the age of twenty-two. He mined in Grass Valley for about a year.

He became a clerk with the Steam Navigation Company on the Sacramento River, and remained in that job until 1856. He then made some money speculating in grain, tobacco, and sugar. He married Amelia H. Diffenderffer, a native of St. Louis and soon thereafter made a trip back East. He stayed about six months before returning.

Upon his return to California, he purchased cattle and started a dairy farm. He was profitable, until a flood came and killed his cattle.

Then he went to Sacramento and worked in the furniture business with a Mr. Vanhusen. Their partnership ended when a fire destroyed their business. He then went back to work for the Steam Navigation Company for about a year.

He bought government land in Monroeville, in what was then Colusa County. He built a house on it, and made other improvements.

He lived in Monroeville from 1860 until 1874, when he sold his land and went to Chico. He purchased property at the corners of Fourth and Wall streets, and, in 1887, at Third and Broadway where he established the Johnson House Boarding, Lodging and Grocery.

He served as the Director of the International Order of Odd Fellows which met in the building opposite the Johnson House. He also was a member of the Ancient Order of United Workmen and the Knights of Honor. He served as a volunteer fireman of Engine Company Number 1.

As president of the board of trustees, he led the effort to get a bridge built over the Sacramento River near Chico. He also opposed the violent anti-Chinese movement in Chico, choosing instead to join with the Committee of One Hundred in efforts to limit Chinese immigration to Chico.

In 1896, Johnson retired from public life, selling his grocery store and hotel. Over the next four years Johnson's health deteriorated and in 1900, he suffered two strokes. On December 16, 1900 Johnson suffered a serious paralytic stroke and by 2:00 in the afternoon on the following day he had died.

He is buried in the Chico Cemetery.

| Preceded by Charles Ball | President of the Board of Trustees of Chico, California; 1879–1882 | Succeeded by Charles Ball |
