= Hiram Batchelder =

American politician (1838–1911)

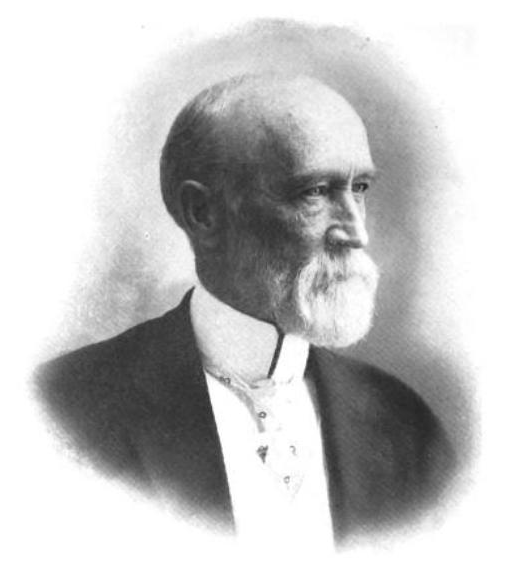

2nd President of the Board of Trustees of Chico, California
- In office 1873–1876
- Preceded by: George Dorn
- Succeeded by: Charles Ball

County Clerk of Butte County, California

Personal details
- Born: Hiram Treat Batchelder; December 14, 1838 Waldo County, Maine
- Died: May 15, 1911 (aged 73) Chico, California
- Resting place: Chico Cemetery, Chico, California
- Party: Republican
- Spouse(s): Eleanor Whiteside (m. June 3, 1866, Chico, California)
- Children: 3
- Education: Hampden Academy, Bowdoin College
- Occupation: educator

Military service
- Allegiance: Union Army
- Years of service: 1861–1862
- Rank: Lieutenant Colonel, Assistant Adjutant General
- Unit: Company A of the 22nd Maine Volunteer Infantry Regiment, Chico Guard

Hiram Treat Batchelder (December 14, 1838 – May 15, 1911) was the second President of the Chico Board of Trustees, the governing body of the city of Chico, California from 1873 to 1876. He served as a trustee of the Chico Normal School, and as County Clerk of Butte County, California.

== Early life and family ==
He was born in Waldo County, Maine on December 14, 1838, the son of Samuel B. Batchelder. He attended Hampden Academy, and Bowdoin College, although he did not graduate.

== Military service ==
At the outbreak of the American Civil War, he enlisted in Company A of the 22nd Maine Volunteer Infantry Regiment under the command of General Banks. In 1862, he was discharged, a disabled man.

== Life in Chico ==
Shortly after being discharged, he came to California by crossing the Central American isthmus. He landed in San Francisco on July 19, 1863. He arrived in Chico on March 18, 1864.

The same year, he was hired as a teacher, and within a few months, he was appointed principal. He held this position for sixteen years. At that time there was only one school, and only one teacher. By 1891, there were four schools and fourteen teachers.

In 1864, he was permitted by the county trustees to purchase fencing-boards from a lumber mill in the mountains for the purpose of building a temporary floor for use in his first year of teaching.

In 1865, a tax was approved by the local electorate by a majority of 123 to 53 to fund a proper school house. The building was finished during the spring of 1866, and furnished with desks.

At the general election in September, 1871, Batchelder was elected superintendent of Butte County schools. In September, 1873, Batchelder was re-elected. Five months before the close of his second term of office, having been elected principal of the Chico school, Mr. Batchelder sent to the board of supervisors his resignation, to take effect on the first of November.

From 1873 to 1876 he was President of the Chico Board of Trustees, and a member until 1878.

In 1885, he ended his teaching, and took a position with the Bank of Chico. He remained with the bank until 1889, when he was appointed postmaster of Chico.

He died in Chico on May 15, 1911, and is buried in the Chico Cemetery.

== Associations ==
- Member (1882), Captain General (by 1891), Chico Lodge No. 111, Free and Accepted Masons
- Member, Grand Army of the Republic

Preceded by George Dorn	President of the Board of Trustees of Chico, California; 1873–1876	Succeeded by Charles Ball
