= John D. Works =

American judge and politician (1847–1928)

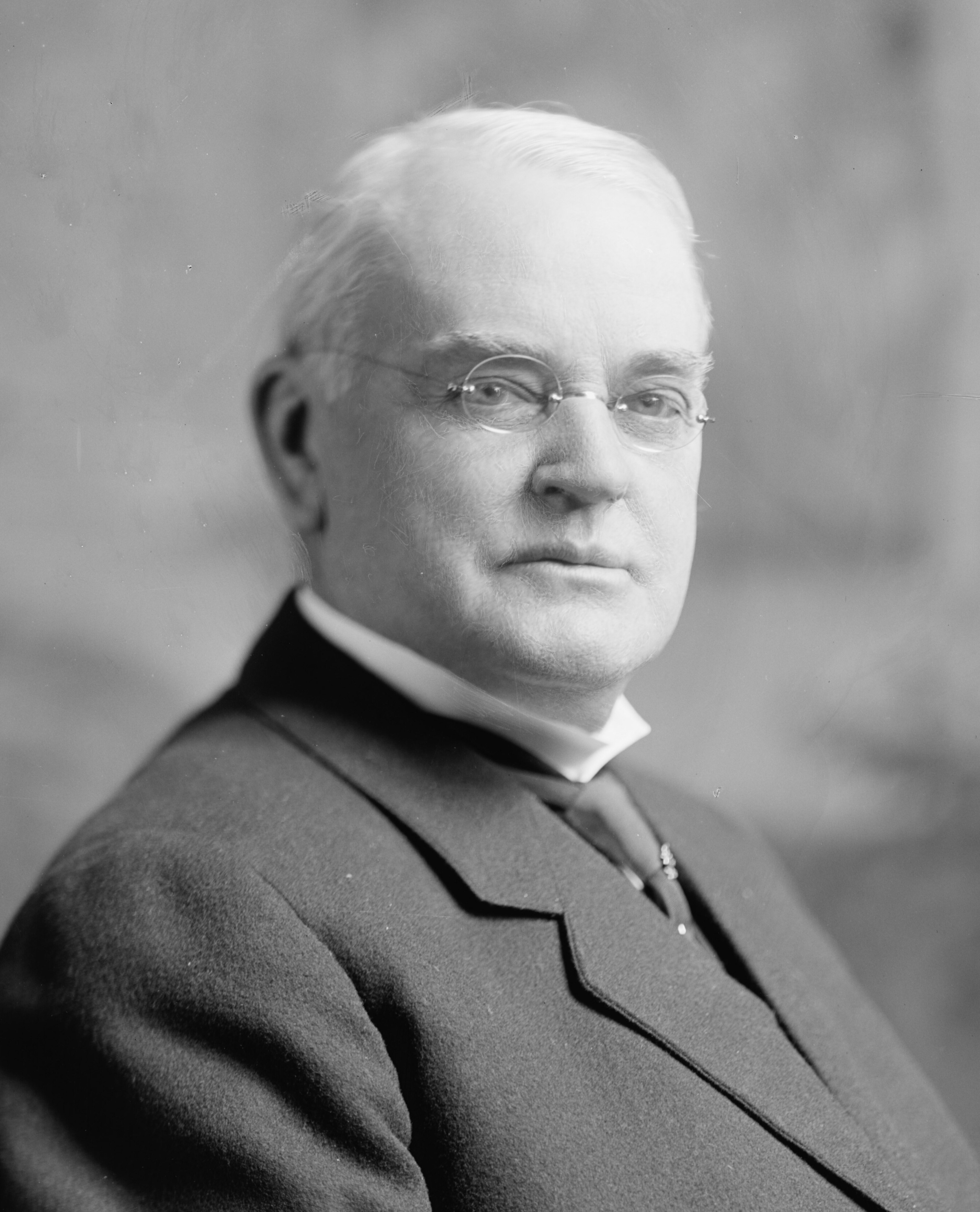
- Works, 1905–1928

United States Senator from California
- In office March 4, 1911 – March 3, 1917
- Preceded by: Frank P. Flint
- Succeeded by: Hiram Johnson

Member of the Los Angeles City Council for the at-large district
- In office December 10, 1909 – March 22, 1910
- Preceded by: Office established
- Succeeded by: Frederick J. Whiffen

Associate Justice of the California Supreme Court
- In office October 2, 1888 – January 5, 1891
- Appointed by: Robert Waterman
- Preceded by: Elisha W. McKinstry
- Succeeded by: Ralph C. Harrison

Judge of the San Diego County Superior Court
- In office 1886–1887
- Appointed by: George Stoneman

Member of the Indiana House of Representatives from the Ohio and Switzerland district
- In office January 9, 1879 – January 6, 1881
- Preceded by: William Freeman
- Succeeded by: Stephen H. Stewart

Personal details
- Born: John Downey Works; March 29, 1847 Rising Sun, Indiana, U.S.
- Died: June 6, 1928 (aged 81) Los Angeles, California, U.S.
- Party: Republican
- Spouse: Alice Banta (m. 1868)

Military service
- Branch/service: Union Army
- Unit: 10th Indiana Cavalry Regiment
- Battles/wars: Civil War

John Downey Works (March 29, 1847 – June 6, 1928) was an American politician and lawyer. He was a U.S. senator representing California from 1911 to 1917, and an associate justice of the California Supreme Court from October 2, 1888, to January 5, 1891.

== Early life ==
Works was born in Ohio County, Indiana, and attended public schools there. During the American Civil War, he served as a member of the 10th Regiment of the Indiana Cavalry. Once discharged, he returned home, read law and in 1868 was admitted to the Indiana bar. In November 1878, he was elected as a representative in the Indiana General Assembly, serving during the 1879 term. In June 1883, he published a book of practice, pleading and forms to match the revised code of Indiana.

== Political career ==
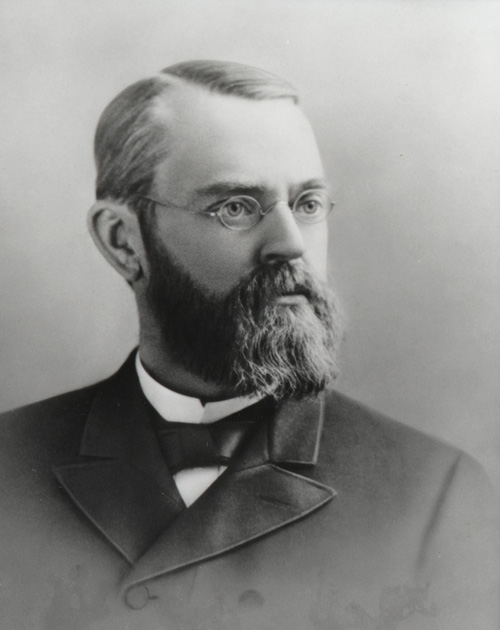
Works c. 1888–1891

In 1883, Works's poor health forced a move to San Diego, California, where he became active in the Republican Party, and rose in California politics. In September 1886, he ran on the Republican ticket, and prior to the election was appointed by Governor Robert Waterman as a judge of the San Diego County Superior Court. In September 1887, he resigned to return to private practice, and Governor Waterman appointed Edwin Parker to fill the vacant seat.

In 1888, Governor Waterman appointed Works as an associate justice of the California Supreme Court to fill a vacancy after the resignation of Elisha W. McKinstry. In August 1888, the Republican Party nominated Works and he was elected to the remaining portion of McKinstry's term ending January 5, 1891. In 1891, after stepping down from the bench, Works became president of the San Diego Sun company, and then returned to private practice with his son in the firm of Works & Works in San Diego.

In January 1896, Works moved to Los Angeles, California. In 1903, Works served as President of the Los Angeles County Bar Association. On December 7, 1909, he was elected as a member of the Los Angeles City Council, and chosen as its president, but he resigned shortly after on March 22, 1910.

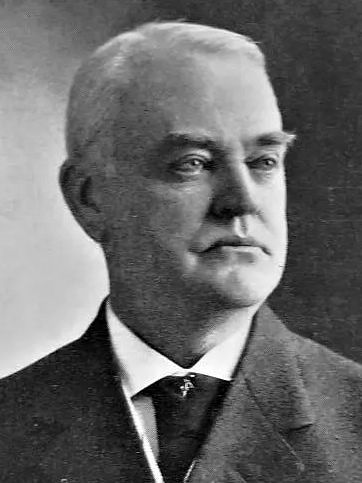
Works in 1909

In 1911, Works was elected to the U.S. Senate, where he served on the committee on Expenditures in the War Department (Sixty-second United States Congress) and the Committee on Fisheries. In February 1917, he and other Progressive Senators, under the moniker "twelve willful men," blocked by filibuster legislation empowering President Woodrow Wilson to arm merchant vessels prior to the United States entering World War I.

Works did not seek renomination to his Senate seat in 1916. The Seventeenth Amendment to the U.S. Constitution, providing for U.S. senators to be elected by the people instead of state legislatures, had been adopted in 1913 but allowed senators serving at the time to finish their terms. Works was the last U.S. senator from California to be elected by the Legislature.

== Later life and death ==
After retiring from the Senate he wrote two books: Duty to Man: A Study of Social Conditions and How They May Be Improved (1919) and What's Wrong With the World? (1922).

On June 6, 1928, he died in Los Angeles and his ashes were placed in Inglewood Park Cemetery.

== Personal life ==
On November 7, 1868, he married Alice Banta, in Vevay, Indiana, and they had two sons, Thomas L. and Louis R., who became an attorney and practiced with his father, and later the presiding justice of the Court of Appeal, Second Division; as well as five daughters: Josephine (who died as an infant), Ida, Laura, Ethel and Isabel. He is said to have been a member of the Church of Christ, Scientist.

== Selected publications ==
- Works, John D. (1919). Man's Duty to Man: A Study of Social Conditions and How They May Be Improved. New York: Neale Publishing Co.
- "Online books by John D. Works". Library of the University of Pennsylvania.

Political offices
Preceded by Office established	President of the Los Angeles City Council; 1909–1910	Succeeded by Boyle Workman
Preceded by Office established	Los Angeles City Council Member; 1909–1910	Succeeded by Frederick J. Whiffen
U.S. Senate
Preceded by Frank P. Flint	U.S. Senator (Class 1) from California; 1911–1917; Served alongside: George C. Perkins, James D. Phelan	Succeeded by Hiram Johnson
Legal offices
Preceded by Elisha W. McKinstry	Associate Justice the Supreme Court of California; 1888–1891	Succeeded by Ralph C. Harrison
