= 10th Indiana Cavalry Regiment =

10th Regiment Indiana Volunteer Cavalry; 125th Indiana Regiment
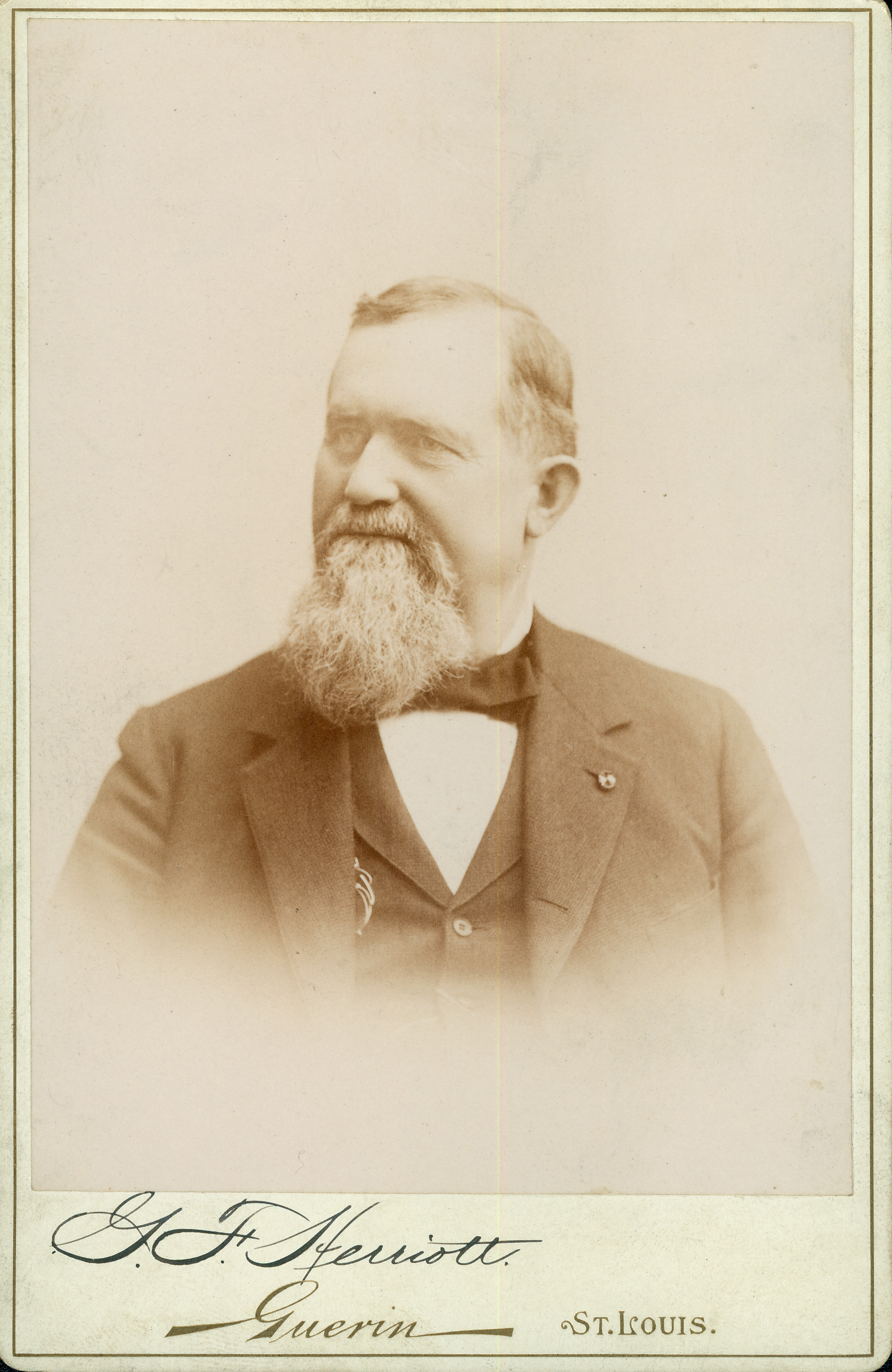
- Major George F. Herriott of the 10th Indiana Cavalry Regiment.
- Active: December 30, 1863, to August 31, 1865
- Country: United States
- Allegiance: Union
- Branch: Cavalry
- Engagements: American Civil War; Battle of Sulphur Creek Trestle; Battle of Decatur; Third Battle of Murfreesboro; Battle of Nashville; Mobile Campaign (1865); Siege of Spanish Fort; Battle of Fort Blakeley

Commanders
- Notable commanders: Thomas Newsom Pace; George Ransom Swallow

The 10th Regiment Indiana Cavalry, also designated the 125th Indiana Regiment, was a cavalry regiment raised in southern Indiana to fight in the American Civil War.

== History ==
The 10th Regiment Indiana Cavalry was organized at Columbus and Vincennes, Indiana, in the winter of 1863 through the spring of 1864. In command of the Regiment was Colonel Thomas N. Pace.

Original Organization of Regiment.
Company	Primary Place of Recruitment	Earliest Captain
A	Posey and Vanderburgh counties	Sylvanus Milner
B	Gibson, Knox, Posey and Vanderburgh counties	Thomas G. Williamson
C	Bartholomew, Jackson, Jennings and Warren counties	Joseph W. Swift
D	Switzerland County	William Mead
E	Clark County	John W. Bradburn
F	Daviess, Gibson, Knox, Pike, Vanderburgh and Warrick counties	Ashbury Hunter Alexander
G	Dubois, Gibson, Spencer, Vanderburgh and Warrick counties	William Jones Jr.
H	Jefferson County	George R. Mitchell
I	Monroe County	Isaac Shelby Buskirk
K	Bartholomew, Gibson, and Posey counties	Dewitt C. James
L	Bartholomew, Jennings, and Lawrence counties	Matthew Gaffney
M	Dubois, Pike, Spencer, Vanderburgh and Warrick counties	Morman Fisher

=== Army Organization ===
Date	Organization
June 1864 through November 1864	Attached to the District of Northern Alabama Department of the Cumberland
November 1864 through March 1865	Attached to the 1st Brigade, 7th Division, Wilson's Cavalry Corps, Military Division of the Mississippi
March 1865 through May 1865	Attached to the 2nd Brigade, Grierson's 1st Cavalry Division, Military Division West Mississippi
May 1865 through June 1865	Attached to the 3rd Brigade, 1st Cavalry Division, Military Division West Mississippi
June 1865 through August 1865	Attached to the District of Vicksburg, Mississippi, Military Division of the Mississippi

=== Time Line ===
Once the Regiment was moved into Pulaski, Tennessee, the 10th Indiana Cavalry Regiment was broken up into detachments for a variety of missions.

Date	Battle or Engagement of Service
June 1 – November 26, 1864	Duty at Pulaski, Tennessee, and Decatur, Alabama, guarding Northern Alabama Railroad by detachments
September 2, 1864	Action at Elk River
September 25, 1864	Sulphur Branch Trestle
September 26, 1864	Richland Creek, near Pulaski, Tennessee
September 26 – 27, 1864	Repulse of Forest's attack on Pulaski, Tennessee
October 1–2, 1864	Athens, Tennessee
October 26 – 29, 1864	Murfreesboro, Tennessee
November 26, 1864	Moved to Nashville, Tennessee
December 1, 1864	A Detachment at Decatur, Alabama - Siege of Decatur
December 5 – 17, 1864	A Detachment moved to Murfreesboro, Tennessee, and participated in the Siege of Murfreesboro
December 5–8, 1864	"The Cedars"
December 13 – 14, 1864	Owen's Cross Roads
December 15 – 16, 1864	Battle of Nashville, Tennessee
December 17 – 28, 1864	Pursuit of Hood to the Tennessee River
December 17, 1864	Franklin and Hollow Tree Gap
December 25 – 26, 1864	Sugar Creek, Pulaski
December 27 – 28, 1864	Decatur, Alabama (Detachment)
December 29, 1864	Pond Springs, Alabama (Detachment)
December 31, 1864	Russellsville (Detachment)
February, 1865	Detachments brought together
February 12 – March 22, 1865	Moved to Vicksburg, Mississippi; then to New Orleans, Louisiana, and to Mobile Bay, Alabama
March 22 – April 12, 1865	Campaign against Mobile and its defenses
March 26 – April 9, 1865	Siege of Spanish Fort and Fort Blakeley
April 12, 1865	Capture of Mobile, Alabama
April 13 – 20, 1865	March to Montgomery, Alabama
June – August 1865	March to Columbus and Vicksburg, Mississippi, and Provost duty in Holmes and Attalla Counties
August 31, 1865	Mustered out at Vicksburg, Mississippi

== Casualties ==
Regiment lost during service 1 Officer and 20 Enlisted men killed and mortally wounded and 4 Officers and 157 Enlisted men by disease. Total 182.

== Notable people ==
- John D. Works: American Judge, politician, and lawyer. Works served as a private in Company D.
- George Ransom Swallow: Banker and businessman from Jerseyville, Illinois. Swallow served as the Major and Colonel of the 10th Indiana Cavalry. Previous to his service in the 10th Indiana, Swallow served in the 7th Independent Battery Indiana Light Artillery.

== See also ==
- List of Indiana Civil War regiments
