= William Robbie =

American politician in California (1849–1929)

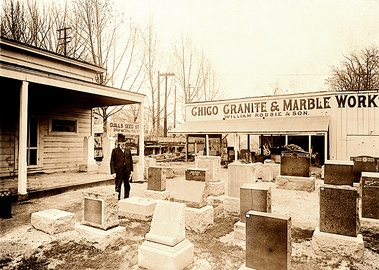
- William Robbie at his stone works located at First and Broadway in Chico

16th President of the Board of Trustees of Chico, California
- In office 1907–1919
- Preceded by: Oliver L. Clark
- Succeeded by: Sherman Reynolds

Personal details
- Born: December 17, 1849 Old Deer, Aberdeenshire, Scotland
- Died: November 11, 1929 (aged 79) Butte County, California
- Resting place: Chico Cemetery, Chico, California
- Spouse: Henrietta Schuster Robbie
- Children: 6
- Occupation: Stone cutter

William Robbie (December 17, 1849 – November 11, 1929) was the sixteenth President of the Chico Board of Trustees, the governing body of Chico, California from 1907 to 1919.

He was born in Old Deer, Aberdeenshire, Scotland on December 17, 1849, the son of James Robbie and Elspet Webster.

William had an illegitimate daughter by Isabella Reid in 1870 named Margaret.

William and his brother John emigrated to America in 1875, and he became a naturalized citizen.

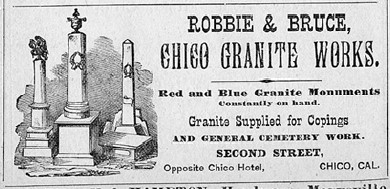
Advertisement for Chico Granite and Marble Works

In 1879, he partnered with his brother and John Bruce to form Robbie and Bruce, a supplier of cut stones located at First and Broadway in Chico. It would later be renamed the Chico Granite and Marble Works, and later Chico Marble Works.

As mayor, he oversaw the building of the old City Hall which was dedicated in 1911. He also accepted the deed to Children's Playground from Annie Bidwell in 1911. He oversaw the building of roads through lower Bidwell Park so that the, "people of Chico could see their new park."

In 1910, he was a founding member of the Butte Humane Society board of directors.

In 1918, the Spanish Flu claimed the life of his son George, while the rest of the family recovered.

== Associations ==
- Eminent Commander, Knights Templar

Preceded by Oliver L. Clark	President of the Board of Trustees of Chico, California; 1907–1919	Succeeded by Sherman Reynolds
