= George Dorn =

American politician

George W. Dorn

1st President of the Board of Trustees of Chico, California
- In office 1872–1873
- Preceded by: office established
- Succeeded by: Hiram Batchelder

Personal details
- Born: c. 1836 Ohio
- Died: 1891 Chico, California
- Spouse: Julia A. Mack
- Children: Winfield Dorn Alvan Dorn

George W. Dorn (c. 1836–1891) was the first President of the Chico Board of Trustees in 1872, when the city of Chico, California was first incorporated. He was the proprietor of Dorn's General Store at Second and Main Streets in downtown Chico.

On February 5, 1872, the first municipal election was held for members of the board of trustees. Upon election, the first trustees chose the length of their terms by lot. Dorn served for one year.

He is buried in the Chico Cemetery.

Preceded by Office established	President of the Board of Trustees of Chico, California; 1872–1873	Succeeded by Hiram Batchelder
