= Charles Ball (politician) =

American politician, jeweler, watchmaker

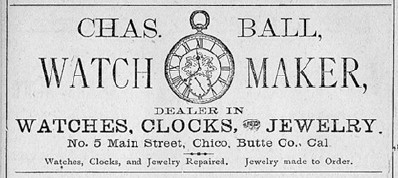
- Advertisement in the City & County Directory of Yuba, Sutter, Colusa, Butte and Tehama Counties 1881

3rd and 5th President of the Board of Trustees of Chico, California
- In office 1876–1879
- Preceded by: Hiram Batchelder
- Succeeded by: Newman Johnson
- In office 1882–1885
- Preceded by: Newman Johnson
- Succeeded by: George Snook

Personal details
- Born: April 4, 1819 Saratoga County, New York
- Died: March 4, 1903 (aged 83) Chico, California
- Resting place: Plot: Sec 3 Row 13 Sp 3B, Chico Cemetery, Chico, California
- Spouse: Rebecca Simpson (m. 1844)
- Children: Alanson, Mary, Almira
- Occupation: jeweler, watchmaker

Military service
- Allegiance: Union Army
- Rank: Private
- Unit: Marysville Rifles

Charles Ball (April 4, 1819 – March 4, 1903) was the third and fifth President of the Chico Board of Trustees, the governing body of the city of Chico, California from 1876 to 1879, and from 1882 to 1885. He was a jeweler and watchmaker.

He was the son of Jacob Green Ball from New Jersey and Lucretia Hoyt, from Norwalk, Connecticut. His mother Lucretia was the third great-granddaughter of Walter Hoyt, one of the founding settlers of Norwalk.

He left from Poughkeepsie, New York to go west while his wife was still pregnant, and his son, Alanson was only two years old in 1848. He departed from New York City on a ship that sailed to Nicaragua, where he crossed over land to the Pacific shore. From there, he sailed to Yerba Buena (the early name of San Francisco) arriving in 1849.

He made a return trip in 1850, and he is listed in the 1850 census living in Poughkeepsie on August 20.

He returned again to California, arriving in Sacramento in 1851. We know he practiced his trade there, presumably relieving miners and prospectors of gold, in exchange for watches and jewelry. He is believed to have made at least two more return trips to New York before finally bringing his wife Rebecca and now, three children, to California in late 1857 or early 1858, again by ship/land/ship crossing. He chose to relocate to Marysville, setting up his shop there.

The 1860 Census lists him with three children, in Marysville, Yuba County. He was still in Marysville at the time of Abraham Lincoln's assassination in April 1865. A letter to the Governor, with his signature, is in the California Archives. He was serving as the Adjutant to the Colonel in charge of the Marysville Rifles, a unit of the California Militia. The letter states the Militia's allegiance to the Union following the assassination, that they were wearing black armbands in mourning and would control and suppress any rabblerousing perpetrated by Confederate sympathizers.

The 1870 Census lists him as residing in Chico. The Charles Ball House (later called the International House) was built in 1869, and is one of the oldest extant structures in the city of Chico. It is one of the Third Street Language Houses located at 536 West Third Street and used to be owned by California State University, Chico. It was moved this location in the 1920s. It was listed on the National Register of Historic Places in 1991, as a contributor to the South Campus Neighborhood.

He served as President of the Chico Board of Trustees, from 1876 to 1879, and from 1882 to 1885.

Preceded by Hiram Batchelder	President of the Board of Trustees of Chico, California; 1876–1879	Succeeded by Newman Johnson
Preceded by Newman Johnson	President of the Board of Trustees of Chico, California; 1882–1885	Succeeded by George Snook
