= 1911 United States Senate election in California =

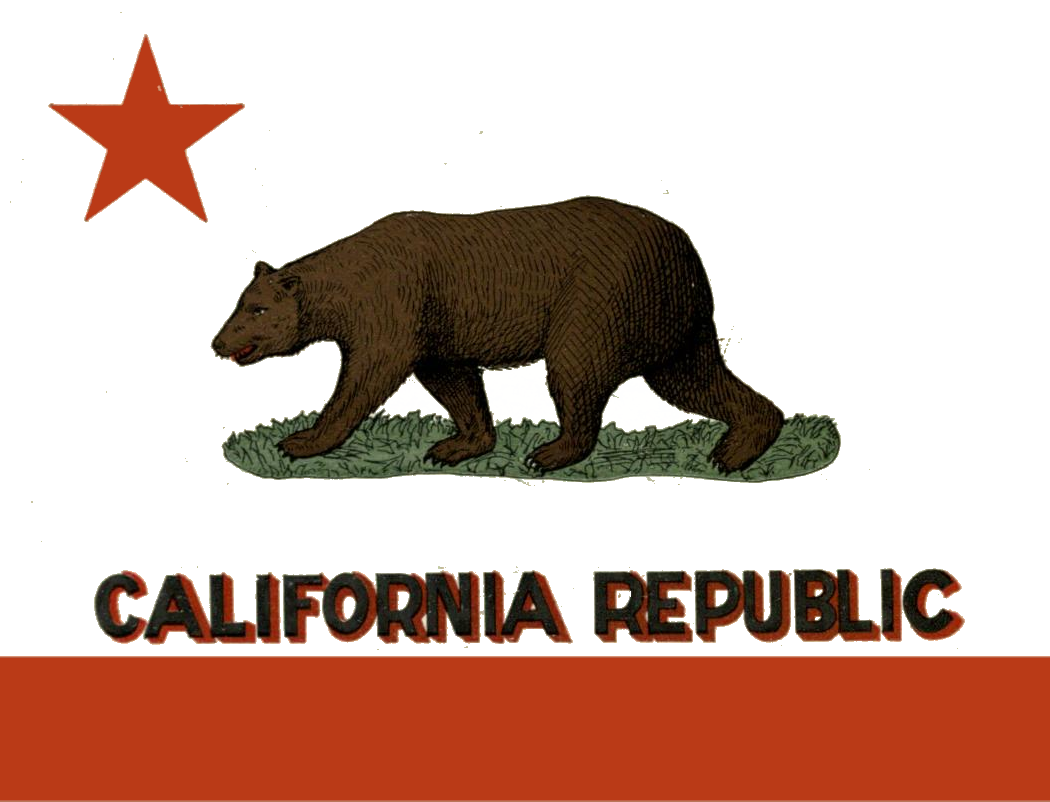
- January 10, 1911

Majority vote of each house needed to win
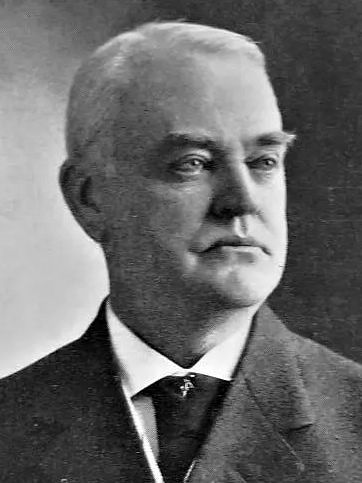

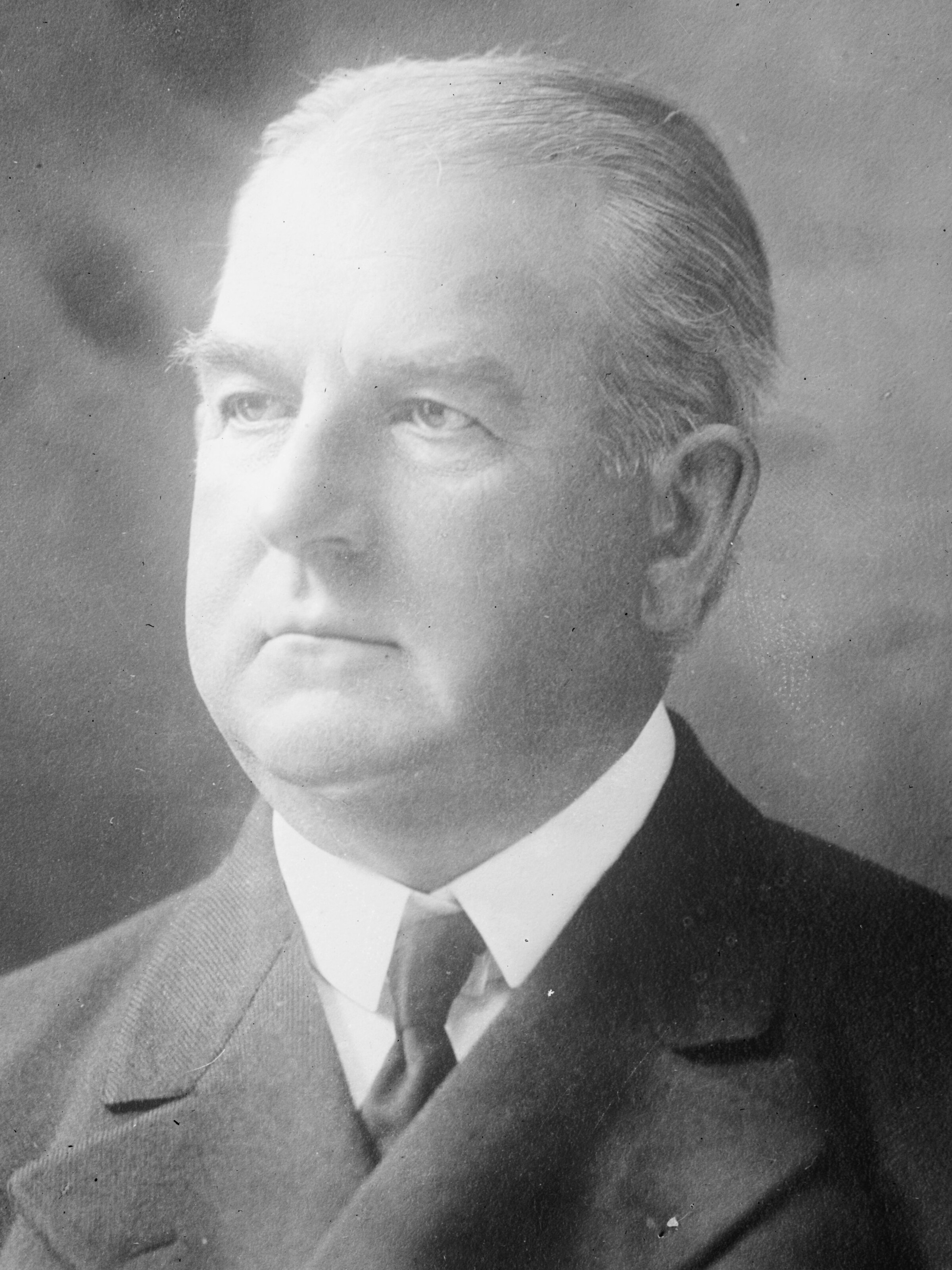

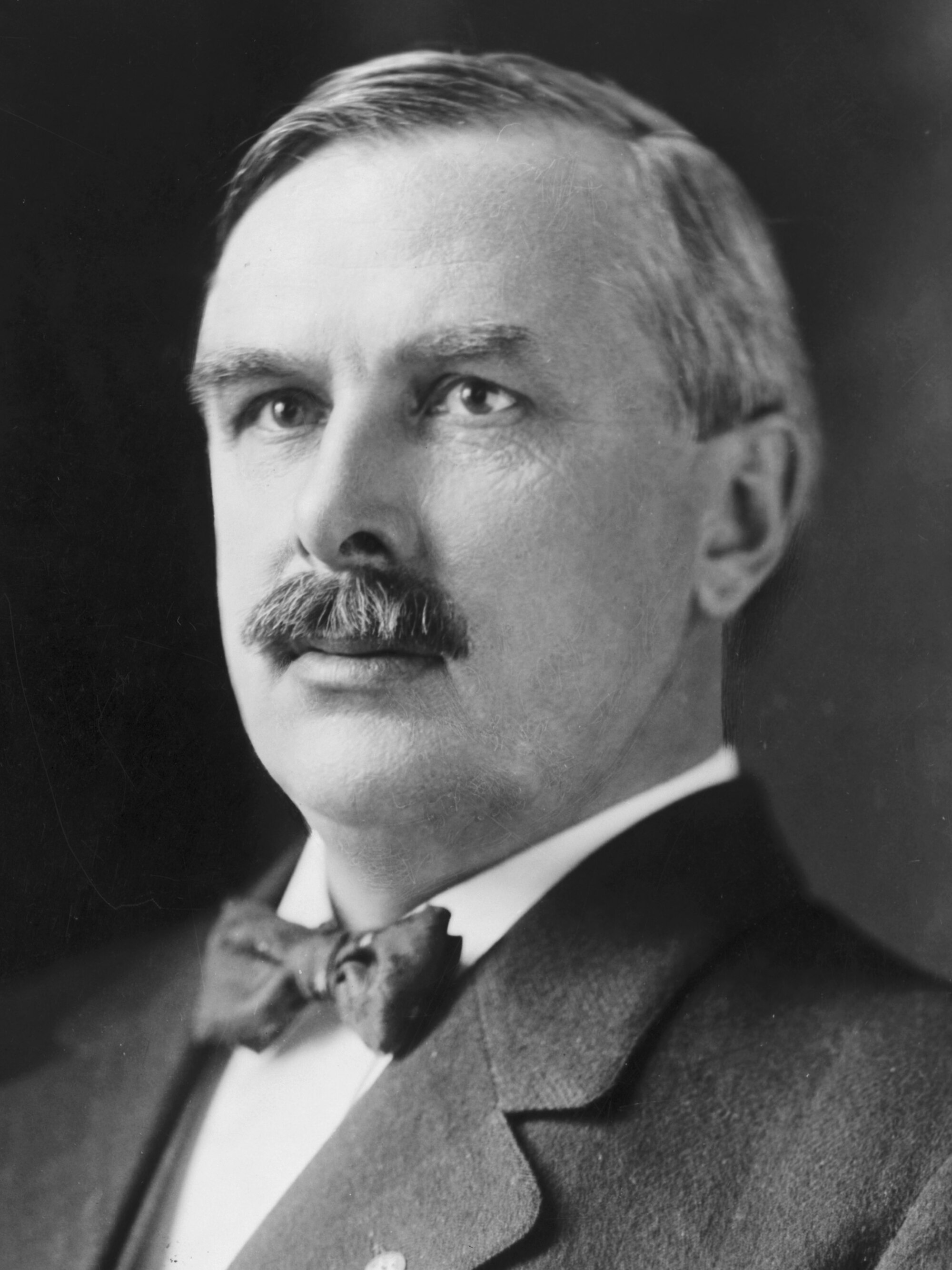
Nominee	John D. Works	Albert Spalding	John E. Raker
Party	Republican	Republican	Democratic
Senate	30	5	3
Percentage	76.92%	12.82%	7.69%
House	62	16	0
Percentage	78.48%	20.25%	0.00%
Senator before election
Frank P. Flint
Republican
Elected Senator
John D. Works
Republican

The 1911 United States Senate election in California was held on January 10, 1911, by the California State Legislature to elect a U.S. senator (Class 1) to represent the State of California in the United States Senate. Republican Los Angeles City Councilman John D. Works was elected over fellow Republican and baseball executive Albert Spalding and several other minor candidates.

== Results ==
Election in the Senate
Party	Candidate	Votes	%
Republican	John D. Works	30	76.92%
Republican	Albert Spalding	5	12.82%
Democratic	John E. Raker	3	7.69%
Republican	William Kent	1	2.56%
Total votes		39	100.00%

Election in the Assembly
Party	Candidate	Votes	%
Republican	John D. Works	62	78.48%
Republican	Albert Spalding	16	20.25%
Democratic	Franklin P. Meserve	1	1.27%
Total votes		79	100.00%
