= Pioneer Days (Chico, California) =

Annual community event in Chico, California, U.S.

Coordinates: 39.7283°N 121.8389°W

Pioneer Day
- Official name: Pioneer Day
- Observed by: Chicoans
- Type: local, historical, cultural
- Celebrations: Pioneer Day Parade
- Date: First Saturday in May
- 2025 date: May 3
- 2026 date: May 2
- 2027 date: May 1
- 2028 date: May 6
- Duration: 7 days
- Frequency: annual

Pioneer Days is the historical name of an annual community event in Chico, California celebrated the week prior to Pioneer Day, the first Saturday in May. Chico has a history of "May Day Parades" dating back to the late 19th century.

In 1915, the first parade that would later come to be called the Pioneer Day Parade was held on the downtown streets of Chico as a celebration of Chico Normal School's Senior Day. This tradition would continue as a celebration of local heritage under various names including Rancho Chico Days, and Celebration of People.

In 1922, a fun-loving Whiskerino club in Sacramento extended a "charter" to William Mclaughlin of Chico.

In 1986 Playboy Magazine named Chico State the "Number One Party School" in the nation. University President Robin Wilson met with city officials including City Manager Fred Davis, and Police Chief, John Bullerjahn with the goal of transforming the reputation by ending the parties directly with police intervention. The following year Playboy sent a photographer to Chico State to photograph female students for its "Women of the Top Party Colleges" pictorial as part of its annual Back to School issue. On 25 April, riots broke out between revelers and police during the Pioneer Days celebration, prompting President Wilson to cancel all further events that year. In 1990 President Wilson officially condemned the 70-year-old tradition and he later announced an end to the celebrations.

The tradition was revived the next year as Rancho Chico Days, and again in 1996 as the Celebration of People. The name Pioneer Days was brought back and has continued to now. One exception was 2020, when it was scrapped caused by the COVID-19 pandemic.
