= Army of West Mississippi =

- Active: 18 February 1865 – 3 June 1865
- Country: United States of America
- Branch: United States Army: Union Army
- Engagements: American Civil War

Commanders
- Notable commanders: Edward Canby

The Army of West Mississippi was a Union army that served in the Western Theater of the American Civil War. It was virtually the same force as the Army of the Gulf, but was renamed when it became a part of the Military Division of West Mississippi, in the Department of the Gulf commanded by Maj. Gen. Edward Canby.

== History ==
After the disastrous Red River Campaign, Nathaniel P. Banks resigned from the army and command of the Department of the Gulf was given to Gen. Stephen Hurlbut, but the military forces in the region that comprised the Army of the Gulf saw little action. In August 1864, units from the department participated in the land attack at the Battle of Mobile Bay, directly commanded by Gen. Gordon Granger.

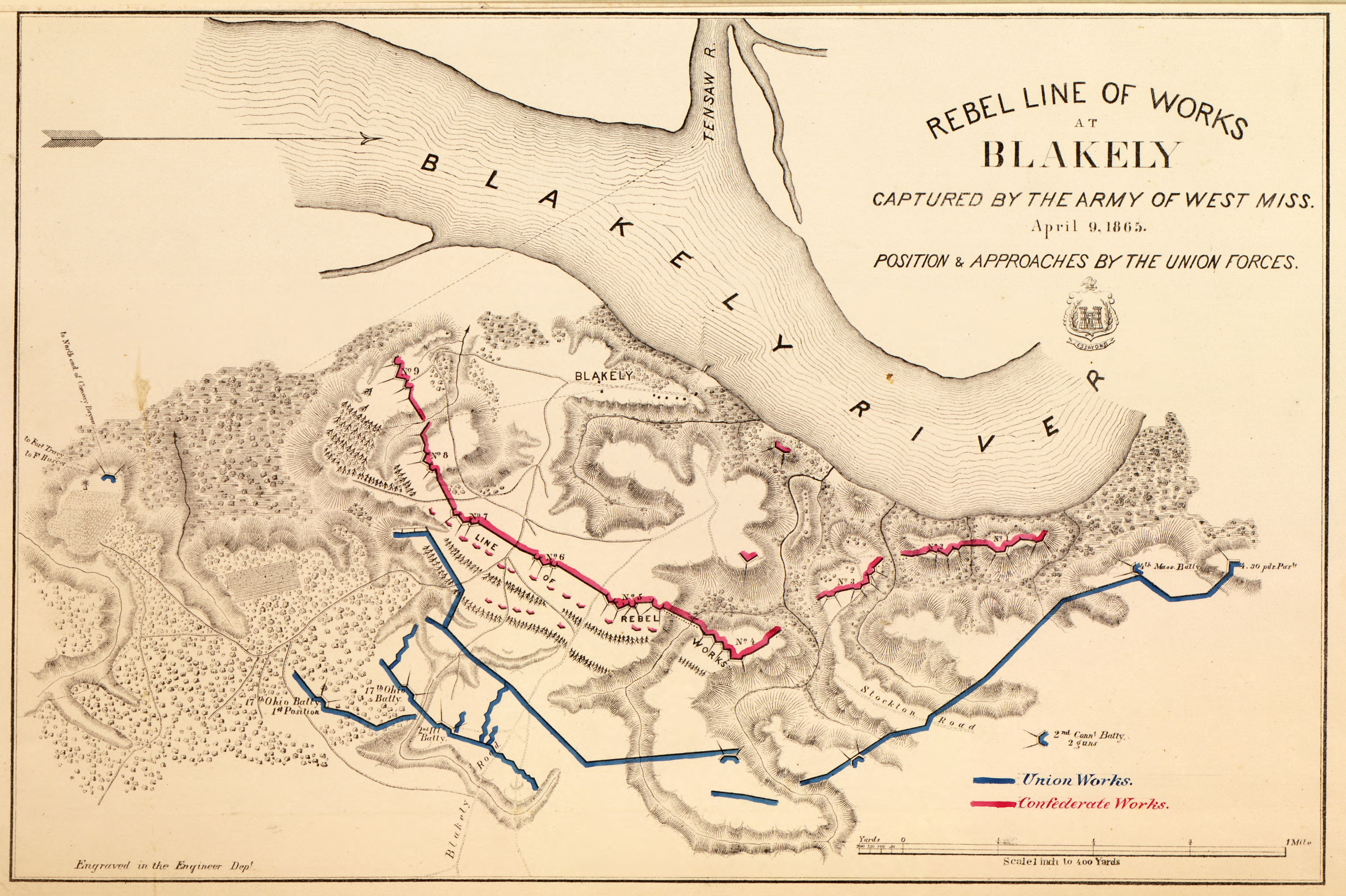
Army of the West Mississippi's movements in capturing Fort Blakeley

In 1865, the XIII Corps and XVI Corps were transferred to the eponymous Military Division of West Mississippi under the command of General Canby, who named the military division's field forces the Army of West Mississippi. The army fought in the Battle of Spanish Fort and the subsequent Battle of Fort Blakeley. When Canby was later appointed commander of the Department of the Gulf, the forces again took the title Army of the Gulf.

== Commander ==
- Major General Edward Canby (18 February 1865 – 3 June 1865)

== Major Battles ==
- Battle of Spanish Fort
- Battle of Fort Blakeley
