= South Campus Neighborhood =

- South Campus Historic District
- U.S. National Register of Historic Places
- U.S. Historic district
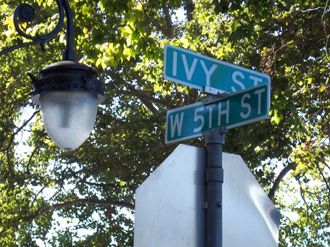
- Fifth and Ivy is the commercial core of the neighborhood.
- Location: Chico, California United States
- Coordinates: 39°43′34″N 121°50′30″W
- Area: 520 acres (210 ha)
- Built: 1860-1949
- Architect: Multiple
- Architectural style: Queen Anne, Colonial Revival, Bungalow/Craftsman
- NRHP reference No.: 91000636
- Added to NRHP: June 24, 1991

The South Campus Historic District is a historic district in Chico, California which was named to the National Register of Historic Places in 1991 through efforts of the Chico Heritage Association. The district is situated entirely within the South Campus Neighborhood. The historical district extends from Salem Street to Cherry Street, and from West Second Street to West Sixth Street. Whereas, the neighborhood extends from West Second Street south to West Ninth Street and west from Salem Street all the way to the city limits, which, in that area, is called the "Green Line." The South Campus Neighborhood Association represents the interests of the neighborhood to the community. There are several fraternity and sorority houses in the area, and the city has designated the South Campus Fraternity/Sorority Overlay Zone which is largely contiguous with the neighborhood and district.

Historically, this area was the first residential area established in the city. The area was surveyed for laying out streets in 1860. South Campus is home of the Stansbury House, the Southern Pacific Depot, and the Language Houses.

Currently, South Campus is a residential neighborhood consisting mostly of young renters under thirty-five, and specifically Chico State students. It is one of the most densely populated areas of the city. The intersection of Fifth and Ivy Streets is a neighborhood commercial core referred to locally as "Five and I".

== Buildings listed as contributing to the Historic District ==
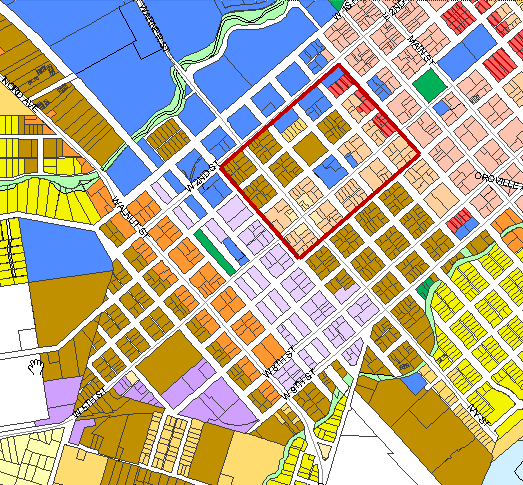
The boundaries of South Campus Historic District as established in 1991

The historic district consists of 114 individual buildings which have been named in the register as contributing to the historical district. They include:

- The Language Houses consist of six houses on West Third Street which had previously been owned by Chico State University's Department of Foreign Languages and Literatures. The houses had been used as student housing with each house having a language theme. The houses had fallen into disrepair under university management of the properties, and the sale of the properties to a developer interested in restoring the historical nature of the houses was a drawn out matter requiring the intervention of the state legislature. Today the houses are privately owned, have been restored and are occupied student housing. The Language Houses are named:

- H.W. Crew House (also called the Spanish House and Alpha Phi House)
- Rouke-Halle House (also called the German House)
- C.C. Richardson House (also called the Italian House)
- J.V. Richardson House
- Charles Ball House (also called the International House)
- French House (also called the Kappa Sigma Delta House)

- 228 Ivy Street
- 319 West Fourth Street
- 322 Normal Avenue
- 324 West Sixth Street
- 325 Ivy Street
- 330 West Fourth Street
- 345 West Fifth Street
- 345 West Sixth Street
- 411 West Sixth Street
- 414 West Fourth Street
- 414 West Sixth Street
- 417 Normal Avenue
- 419 West Sixth Street
- 420 West Fourth Street
- 420 West Sixth Street
- 421 West Third Street
- 428 West Fifth Street
- 428 West Fourth Street
- 429 Normal Avenue
- 429 West Third Street
- 430 West Third Street
- 431 West Sixth Street
- 441 West Fourth Street
- 511 West Fifth Street
- 514 Ivy Street
- 518 West Sixth Street
- 519 West Fifth Street
- 527 West Fifth Street
- 527 West Sixth Street
- 529 Ivy Street
- 529 Normal Avenue
- 530 Normal Avenue
- 530 West Sixth Street
- 541 West Fifth Street
- 543 West Sixth Street
- 544 West Sixth Street
- 611 West Fourth Street
- 621 West Sixth Street
- 625 West Third Street
- 626 West Fourth Street
- 627 West Second Street
- 629 West Sixth Street
- 635 West Second Street
- 706 West Sixth Street
- 718 West Sixth Street
- 719 West Sixth Street
- 720 West Fourth Street
- 727 West Sixth Street
- 728 West Third Street
- 729 West Second Street
- 737 West Second Street
- 745 West Third Street
- Abraham House
- Allen-Sommer-Gage House
- As You Like It
- Bicknell Cottages
- Bicknell House
- Bidwell Chapel
- Big Red Barn
- C.C. Mathews House
- Chester Cole Residence
- Copeland Residence
- Cosby-McLain Home
- Costar House
- Crosette House
- Eames Cottages
- Eames House
- F.M. Jackson House
- Fifth Street Rooming House
- House of Vinson
- J.F. Fordham House
- Kate Bower House
- Kennedy House
- L.A. McIntosh House
- Lizzie Crew Canfield House
- Miller House
- Notre Dame School
- Nottleman House
- Ormsby House
- P.E. O'Hair House
- Presbyterian Parsonage
- Rev. Jesse Wood House
- Reynolds House
- Sapp Hall
- Sherwood House
- Sierra Hall
- Stansbury House (Chico, California)
- Theodore Schwein Home
- W.H. Schooler House
- Walker House
- Waterland Apartments
- White House

== South Campus Neighborhood Association ==
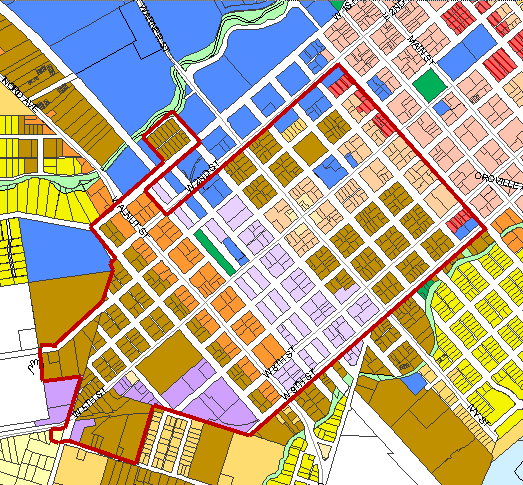
The boundaries of South Campus Neighborhood as established by the neighborhood association in 1996

In September 1996, a group of residents, property owners, business owners, and student organization representatives got together to form the South Campus Neighborhood Association. This was, in part a result of the City Council, in May of that year, directing the Planning Commission to study zoning for "Student Living Groups" (i.e. fraternities and sororities, etc.). The group prepared a Constitution for the neighborhood association, and an outline for a neighborhood plan; both of which were presented at a neighborhood meeting in March 1997.

The association has successfully lobbied the city for increased lighting, infrastructure repairs (such as sidewalks), increased community involvement in police strategies, and amendments to the city's noise ordinance. The neighborhood association requested that the city consider creating a Special Events Permit, so as to address some of the issues arising from the youth of its residents. Although the city, did not establish such a permit, the proposed zone which was to be associated with this permit eventually was approved by the council as a unique Fraternity/Sorority Overlay Zone.

== South Campus Fraternity/Sorority Overlay Zone ==
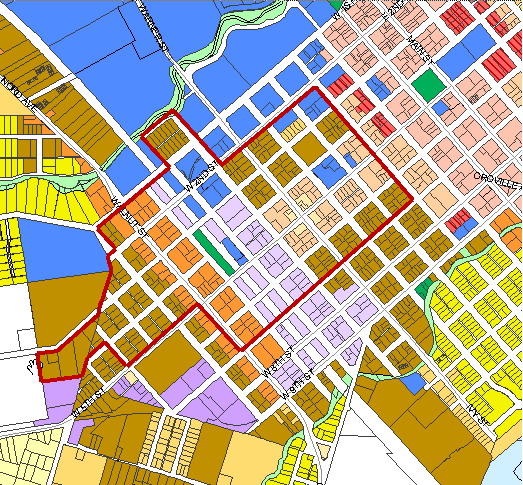
The boundaries of South Campus Fraternity/Sorority Overlay Zone as established by the City of Chico, in 1997

The land use regulations in the zone are combined with those of the base district, except that fraternities and sororities shall be a permitted use, with the approval of a ministerial permit by the Planning Director.
