= Robin Wilson (author) =

American science fiction writer

Robin Scott Wilson (September 19, 1928 – September 2013) was an American science fiction writer and editor, and president of California State University, Chico, from 1980 to 1993.

== Life and career ==
Wilson was born in Columbus, Ohio, and earned a BA degree from Ohio State University in 1949, before spending a year in the Merchant Marine. He then went back to school, obtaining an MA at the University of Illinois. He served in military intelligence in the United States Navy for several years, before finishing his PhD work at the University of Illinois in 1959.

Wilson worked for the CIA for several years in the 1960s before deciding to devote himself to teaching and writing. He taught English and writing, and organized the original Clarion Writers Workshop, at Clarion State College, Pennsylvania 1968, followed by instruction at Tulane University, and Michigan State University. He also wrote several science fiction novels, and served as a consulting editor for The Journal of Higher Education. He had several short stories published in The Magazine of Fantasy & Science Fiction during the 1990s. In many of his fiction works, he is credited as "Robin Scott".

In 1980, Wilson was appointed president of California State University, Chico. In March 1987, the university was named the number one party school in the nation. This prompted Wilson to demand that the local police actively intervene in the parties, shutting them down by force. During the last week in April, police wearing riot gear marched into a crowd of pedestrians in a flying v formation, causing a police riot. The annual observation of Pioneer Days, ordinarily held on the first Saturday in May was suspended. The annual event has since been re-organized. He also asked the ROTC to leave the campus, after a resolution passed by the school's faculty senate.

Wilson retired from his position with Cal State Chico in 1993, and moved on to California State University, Monterey Bay, where he served as a "trustee professor".

== Bibliography ==
- Scott, Robin (Dec 1966). "Decoy system". Galaxy Science Fiction. 25 (2): 116–124.
- "Fair Test", Galaxy, April 1967
- "Who Needs Insurance?", 1967 Possible influence upon The Terminator with time travel via the necessarily unclothed in being sent back to modify an ancestor of those tipping a winning war against aliens or machines.

Nebula Award Stories Two, Nebula Best Novelella, first selection.

- "Seconds' Chance", Galaxy, July 1968
- "The Grift of the Magellanae", The Magazine of Fantasy & Science Fiction, March 1999
- Clarion (editor) (this was a collection of short science fiction which was followed by Clarion 2 and Clarion 3)
- Death by Degrees: A Mystery
- Paragons: Twelve Master Science Fiction Writers Ply Their Craft (editor)
- Those Who Can: A Science Fiction Reader (editor)
- Wondermakers: an anthology of classic science fiction (co-editor)
- Wilson, Robin (May 2000). "The mediated faculty". F&SF. 98 (5): 88–96.

== Sources ==
- Official Cal State, Chico bio page

Preceded by Robert L. Fredenburg (acting)	President of California State University, Chico; August 1980 – July 1993	Succeeded by Manuel A. Esteban
