= Sunset Junction Street Fair =

Annual event in Los Angeles, California, U.S.

The Sunset Junction Street Fair was an event held annually in the Sunset Junction neighborhood of the Silver Lake community in Los Angeles, California. Occurring annually in late August, the two-day neighborhood festival was first held in 1980, as a way to quell tensions between the neighborhood's long-time Latino residents and the newer gay residents, who some felt were causing the neighborhood to become gentrified. It also served as an alternative to the Christopher Street West Festival in nearby West Hollywood.

The festival, put on by the Sunset Junction Neighborhood Alliance, closed off a large portion of Sunset Boulevard and features live music, rides, food and merchandise vendors. Over the years, many noted musicians and musical acts performed, including Beck, Elliott Smith, Sleater-Kinney, X, Camper Van Beethoven, Redd Kross, Black Rebel Motorcycle Club, Eels, Chaka Khan, the Ladies of The Supremes, and Nick Name and the Normals, Jody Watley among others.

== 2011 festival closure ==
In 2011, the fair was scheduled to take place on August 27 and 28. After booking the talent the promoters failed to secure permits for the fair and it was canceled. In dispute was $260,000 owed to the city for unpaid fees for the previous couple of years. In a last minute ditch effort, the promoters of Sunset Junction were able to secure a $142,000 backing from Live Nation to at least cover this year’s bills, which would have gone towards cost of police protection, parking enforcement and other city services. The $142,000 did not include any part of the $260,000 that is due for previous years. Despite this, the permits were still denied by members of the Board of Public Works.

In the previous year, the city issued a permit for the event even though the estimated fees for police, sanitation and traffic crews were not paid in advance. Following the festival, the city sent organizers three invoices for $256,484. The unpaid bill was eventually forwarded to the Office of Finance, which turned it over to a collection agency, and ultimately the matter was referred to the city attorney’s office.

According to the Los Angeles Times, “It was the most aggressive stand yet in the city's effort to get tough on the people and organizations who owe money to cash-strapped City Hall.”

One of the reasons for the denial of the permits was that the festival's original reason for charging admission was that the proceeds would be reinvested in the community. However, several community advocates claimed that said proceeds were, in fact, not being reinvested, and that the committee handling the festival were unwilling to submit themselves to public scrutiny of their finances.

To date, neither the vendors nor ticketholders have been reimbursed. The fair's official ticket vendor, Flavorus, has suggested that ticketholders contact their credit card providers to dispute the ticket purchases, and that they themselves are unable to provide refunds as they have not been paid either.

It was the first time in the street fair's 30-year history that it had been cancelled.

In February 2012, the Sunset Junction Neighborhood Alliance filed for Chapter 7 bankruptcy, citing $900,000 in debts and only $500 in assets. Alliance president Michael McKinley is also listed among the creditors owed money. According to the official filing, he claims that he is owed $25,000. The City of Los Angeles is listed as the most prominent creditor, at $250,000.

== Festival lineups ==
=== 2001 ===
Elliott Smith, Imperial Teen, Beachwood Sparks, Nona Hendryx, Scherrie Payne, Dee Dee Sharp, Little Anthony & the Imperials, Candye Kane, Mike Watt

=== 2002 ===
Saturday, August 24 and Sunday, August 25: Sonic Youth, Chaka Khan, Sleater-Kinney, Mary Wilson, Mudhoney, Juan Atkins, Pansy Division, DJ Irene, Arthur Adams, Mondo Generator, Richard Humpty Vission, tribute to the Gun Club, Radar Bros, DJ Colette, Scherrie Payne, Bluebird, Very Be Careful, The Warlocks, D Fuse, Arkestra Klandestina, Distortion Felix, Tony Watson, Burning Star

=== 2003 ===
Saturday, August 23: Nick Name and The Normals, Glen Meadmore, Guided By Voices, Circle Jerks, The Muffs, The Twilight Singers featuring Greg Dulli, Kennedy, Icarus Line, Brian Jonestown Massacre, Metric, Gwendolyn and the Good Time Gang, Moving Units, Silversun Pickups

Sunday, August 24: The Dandy Warhols, Isaac Hayes, Phantom Planet, Rilo Kiley, Folk Implosion, Earlimart, Alaska, The Tyde, Nervous Return, Midnight Movies, The 88, The Lisa Marr Experiment, The Sixth Chamber

=== 2004 ===
Saturday, August 21: The Donnas, Ashford & Simpson, Ben Kweller, Ima Robot, Har Mar Superstar, The Like, The Unicorns, Dengue Fever, Giant Drag, Autolux, The Like, Los Abandoned, The Starlite Desperation, The Unicorns, Bedroom Walls, Christine Ortega, Quinto Sol

Sunday, August 22: X, Camper Van Beethoven, Thelonious Monster, Juliette and The Licks, The scAvengers with Penelope Houston, Arthur Lee & Love, Stephanie Mills, Very Be Careful, Ritmo Flamenco, dios malos, The Vacation, Dirty Little Secret, Your Enemies Friends, The High Speed Scene

=== 2005 ===
Saturday, August 27: Rilo Kiley, John Cale, The Walkmen, Jason Falkner, Black Mountain, Foreign Born, Something for Rockets, Run Run Run, Vagenius, Let's Go Sailing, The Ettes

Sunday, August 28: The New York Dolls, Suicide Girls, Eagles of Death Metal, The Gossip, The Weirdos, Burning Brides, Nebula, The Leaving Trains, Rolling Blackouts, Viva K, The Willowz

=== 2006 ===
Saturday, August 26: Black Rebel Motorcycle Club, The Eels, Redd Kross, The Elected, Ashford & Simpson, Millie Jackson, Arthur Adams, Lavender Diamond, Darker My Love, Monsters Are Waiting, The Little Ones, Great Northern, A Minor Canon

Sunday, August 27: The Cramps, Drive By Truckers, Hank Williams III, Richard Street, Nona Hendryx, Dave Alvin, Candye Kane, Mike Stinson, Cousin Lovers, I See Hawks In LA, Restaurant

=== 2007 ===
Saturday, August 18: Ben Harper, Blonde Redhead, Morris Day & The Time, Autolux, Deniece Williams, Sea Wolf, Broken West, The Pity Party, The Parson Redheads, Division Day, Renee Dawson, Breakestra, Renaissance, Raks Majnoun, Bobby Matos, Ritmo Flamenco

Sunday, August 19: She Wants Revenge, Buzzcocks, Hot Hot Heat, The O'Jays, The Bronx, The Aggrolites, Millie Jackson, The Airborne Toxic Event, The Movies, Eskimohunter, Tawny Ellis, Vilma Diaz, Cheb i Sabbah, Rocky Dawuni, Mesmera, Conjunto Jardin

=== 2008 ===
Saturday, August 23: DJ Alfred Hawkins, Haycock, USA in L.A., Radars to The Sky, DJ Al Jackson, DJ Q-Bwoy, Christopher Yettes & Patti Amelatti, Happy Hollows, DJ Eddie One, Cava, Very Be Careful, Castledoor, Vilma Diaz, Kim Hill, Raks Majnoun, Bodies of Water, Arthur Adams, The Rebirth, Ritmo Flamenco, Jonathan Rice, Michael Henderson, Notch, Jeane Carne, Antibalas Afrobeat Orchestra, Langhorne Slim, Billy Paul, Sam Moore in Tribute to Isaac Hayes, Broken Social Scene, Cold War Kids

Sunday, August 24: DJ Mexican Dubwiser, Azul, USA in L.A., The Henry Clay People, DJ Cid Hernandez, DJ Drez, Christopher Yettes & Patti Amelatti, Voxhaul Broadcast, Charangoa, Chana, Very Be Careful, Oliver Future, Leslie Paula & The Latin Soul Band, J Davey, Mesmera, Gram Rabbit, NK Band, Sister Nancy, Health, Jeffrey Osborne, Kinky, the Germs, Stephanie Mills, Beachwood Sparks, !!!(Chk Chk Chk), The Black Keys

=== 2009 ===
Saturday, August 22: DJ Lady Sha, DJ Wyatt Case, Rose's Pawn Shop, Spencer The Gardener, Sonsoles, Les Nubians, Mary Wilson, DJ Kutmah, DJ Plan 9, Boogaloo Assassins, Dengue Fever, Alex Cuba, SA-RA, Sly and Robbie, Troupe Zaghareet, Ollin, Bobby Matos, DJ Michael Mosley, DJ Score, Villains, DJ Destructo, Jason Bentley, Gran Ronde, Miss Derringer, War Tapes, Warpaint, Rumspringa, Nico Vega, The Submarines, The Delta Spirit, Islands, Conor Oberst & The Mystic Valley Band

Sunday, August 23: DJ Josh One, DJ Nobody, Charangoa, Iliana Rose, Cody Chesnutt and Martin Luther, Chris Clark w/ Arthur Adams, DJ B+, DJ Future P, Orgone, Build An Ark, Nortec Collective: Bostich & Fussible, Arrested Development, Ritmo Flamenco, Balandugu Kan, Very Be Careful, DJ Joe Leyva, DJ Erick Neutron, Bruce Perdew, Adam-12, Love Grenades, Nico Stai, Local Natives, Fool's Gold, Night Horse, Tiny Masters Of Today, Mika Miko, The Sonics, Built To Spill

=== 2010 ===
Saturday, August 21: White Apple Tree, Ferocious Few, Hanni El Khatib, Saint Motel, Chris Pierce, Dam Funk, Miles Davis/Bitches Brew Remix Feat. J Rocc, GhostLand Observatory, Balandugu Kan, Jimmie & Moral Groove, Rhythm Roots All Stars, Orgone, Medusa, Evelyn Champagne King, The Ohio Players, DJ Pelau, DJ Jeremy Sole, Maleco Collective, B-side Players, Big Daddy Kane Feat. Connie Price & The Keystones, Fishbone, Bad Brains, Christopher Yates Circus, Hyphy Crunk, DJ Brent Bolthouse, DJ Eric Cubee-Chee, Speaker Junkies, Party Crashers F/DJ Ruckus & Cory Enemy, Shiny Toy Guns-Hybridigital F/Wild Child, The Silver Lake Chorus, Moses Campbell, Sweaters, Andy Clockwise, Pollyn, East Conference Champions, Chief, Everest, Dawes

Sunday, August 22: Raheem Cohen, Aurum, Rolling Radio, Gringo Star, Girls In A Coma, Insite, Division Minuscula, Edward Sharpe and the Magnetic Zeros, Spellbound, Ray Ricky Rivera, Permanent Ability, Fitz and the Tantrums, Freddie Poole w/Ellis Hall, Mayer Hawthorne & The County, The Whispers, DJ Wing Ko, DJ Carlos Nino, Palenke Soul Tribe, Bobo Meets Rhettamatu, Meshell Ndegeocello, Lee Scratch Perry, Christopher Yates Circus, The Union Sound, DJ Eric Neutron, DJ Gusto, DJ Dexterous, DJ Splyce, CC Sheffield, Caroline D'Amore, DJ Doc Martin, Gwendolyn and the Good Time Gang, The Janks, Wheel House, Leslie & The Badgers, Red Cortez, The Deadly Syndrome, The Crystal Antlers, Sam Sparro, Infinity

== See also ==
- Off Sunset Festival
