= Mattachine Steps =

Outdoor staircase in Silver Lake, Los Angeles

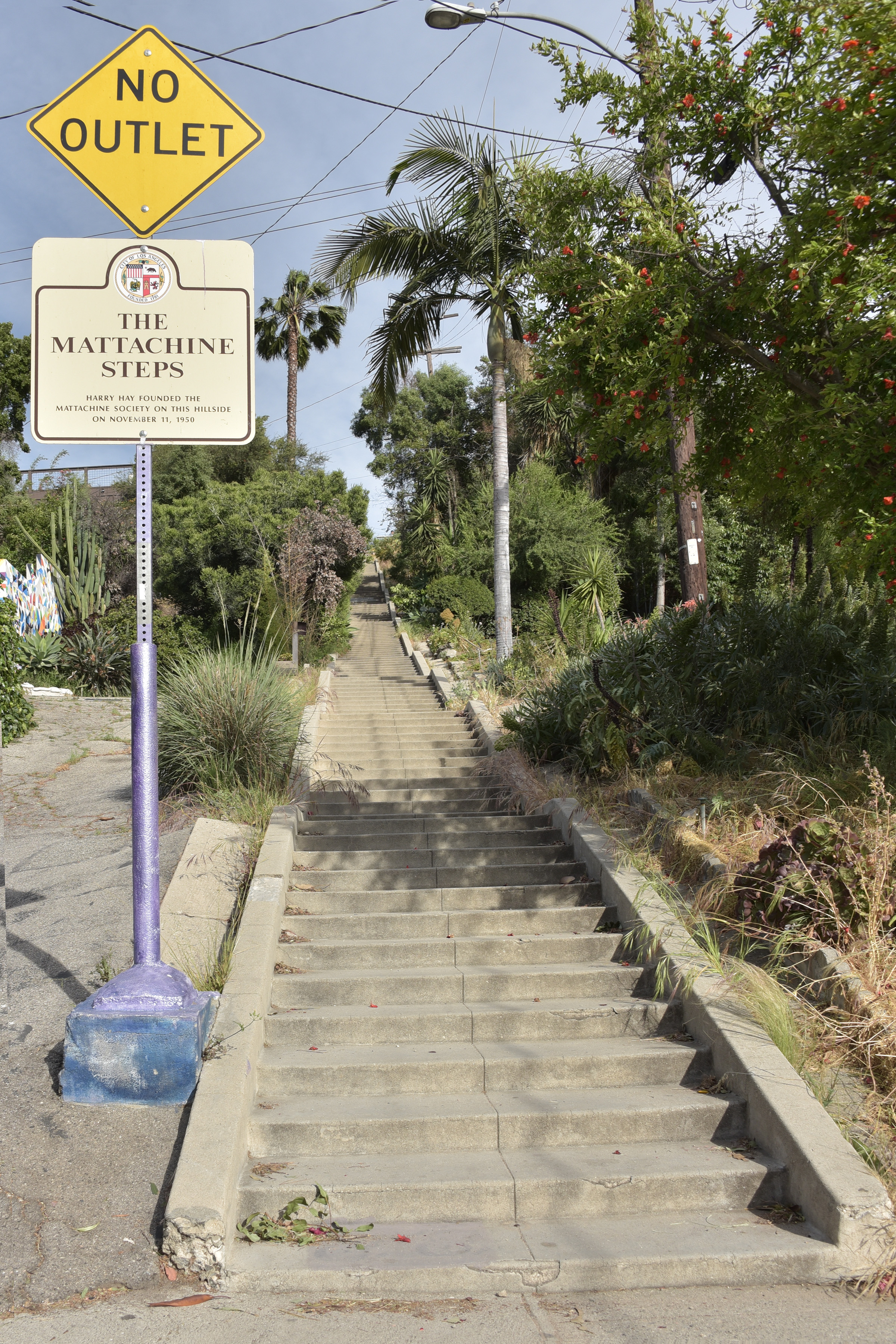
- The steps in 2017
- Location: Silver Lake, Los Angeles, California, U.S.
- Location within California
- Coordinates: 34.0951°N 118.2608°W

The Mattachine Steps, also known as the Cove Avenue stairway, is an outdoor staircase in Silver Lake, Los Angeles, in the U.S. state of California, dedicated to the Mattachine Society in 2012 in memory of Harry Hay, who cofounded the gay rights group. The stairs are on the hillside where Hay founded the Society on November 11, 1950.

The stairs are not painted and the historical plaque with the Mattachine Society’s history was removed.

There are 52 historic public stairways in Silver Lake.

== See also ==
- Micheltorena Steps
- List of Los Angeles Historic-Cultural Monuments in Silver Lake, Angelino Heights, and Echo Park
