= Micheltorena Steps =

Los Angeles outdoor staircase

Coordinates: 34°05′14″N 118°16′34″W

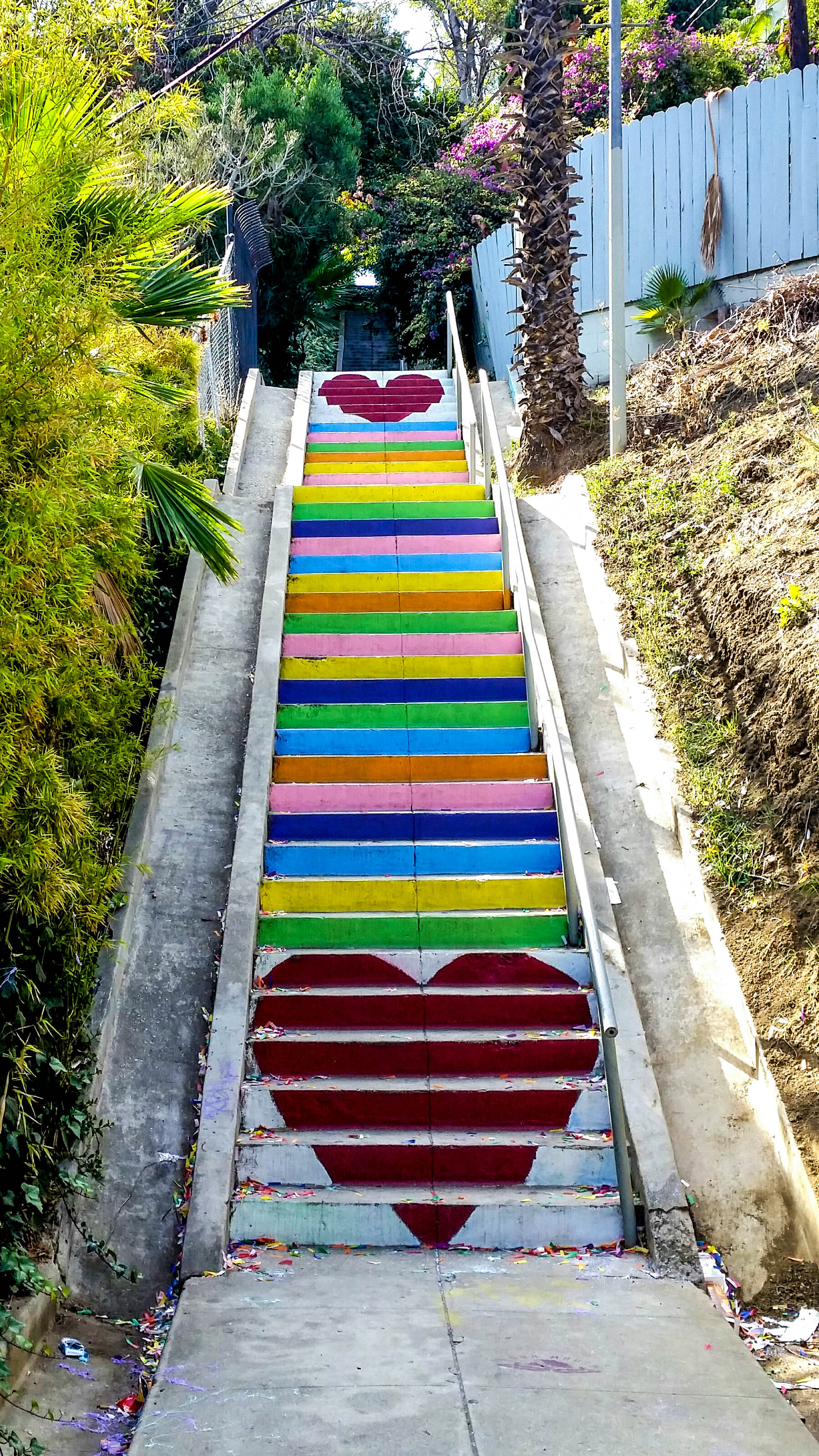
The stairs in 2016

The Micheltorena Steps is an outdoor staircase in Silver Lake, Los Angeles, in the U.S. state of California. It is one of 52 historic public stairways in Silver Lake.

The staircase has 204 steps. It connects Sunset Boulevard to Micheltorena Street. The iconic heart on the stairs vertical part was painted in 2013 by Corinne Carrey. In 2015, with artists Carla O’Brien and Mandon Bossi, Carrey painted the stairs in bright colors, and unofficially renamed it Stair Candy. The stairs were approved as a public arts project by the city in 2019.

In April 2022, the stairs were painted over with white paint. The artists and the city were not involved in this act, leaving only vandalism to explain the act. The following month, the stairs' painting was restored. Anti-graffiti coating was applied to prevent future acts of vandalism.

== See also ==
- Mattachine Steps
- List of Los Angeles Historic-Cultural Monuments in Silver Lake, Angelino Heights, and Echo Park
- List of parks in Los Angeles
