= Silver Lake, Los Angeles =

Silverlake
- Neighborhood
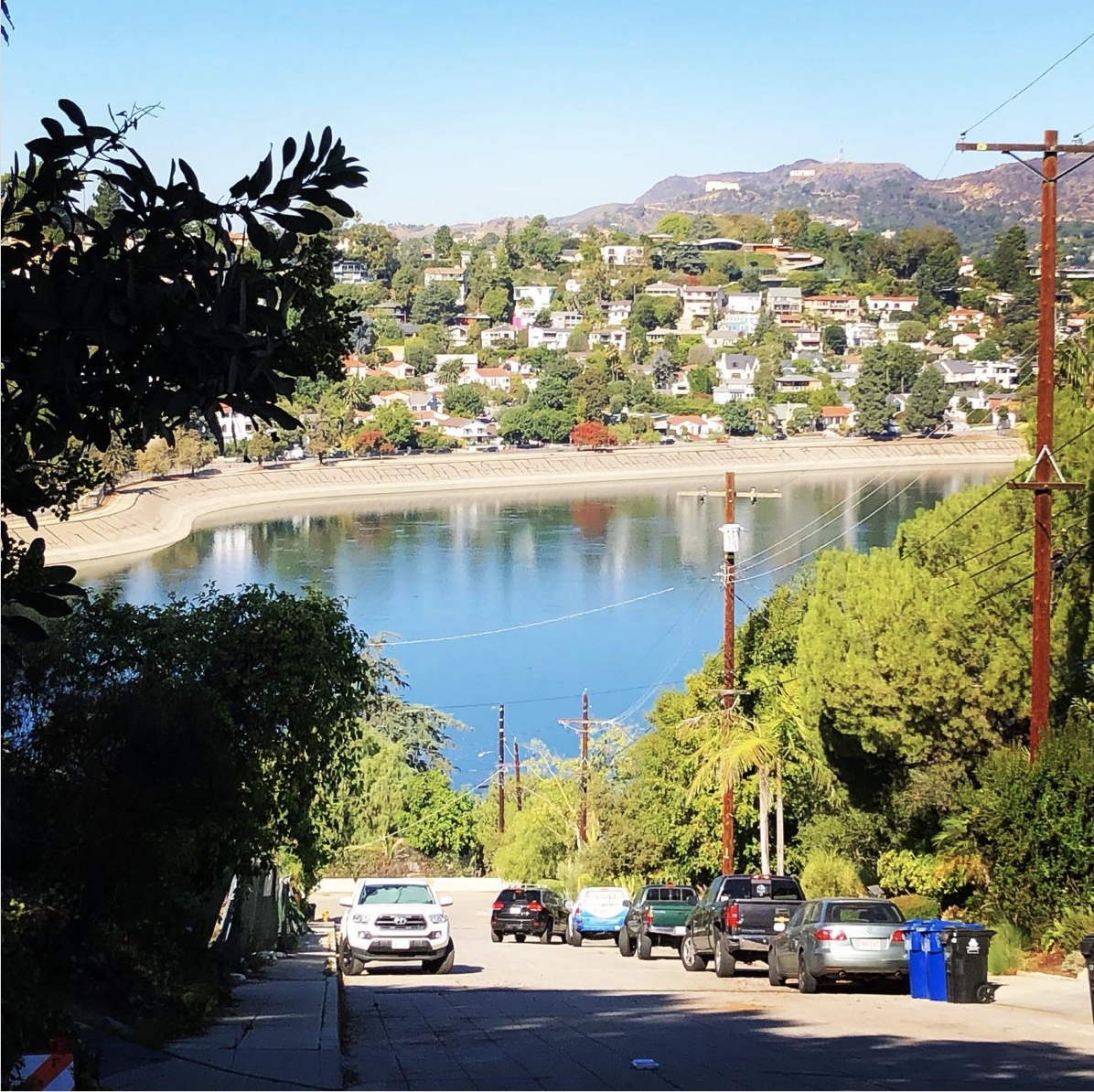
- The hills of Silverlake

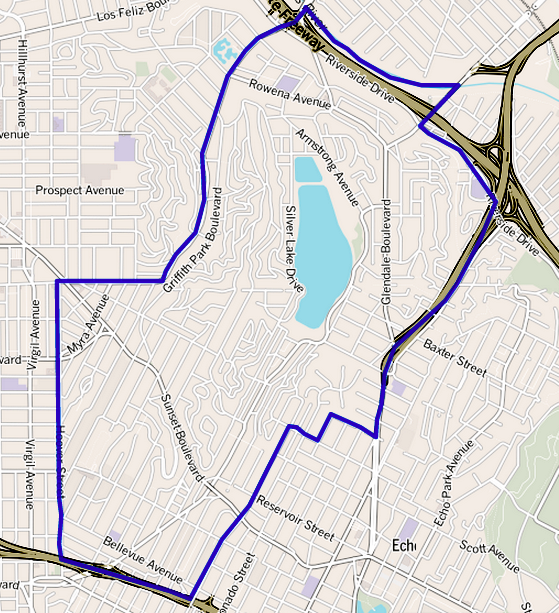
- Silverlake boundaries as drawn by the Los Angeles Times

- Location within Central Los Angeles
- Coordinates: 34°5′40″N 118°16′3″W
- Country: United States
- State: California
- County: Los Angeles
- City: Los Angeles
- Named for: Politician Herman Silver
- Elevation: 358 ft (109 m)
- Time zone: UTC-8 (PST)
  - Summer (DST): UTC-7 (PDT)
- Zip codes: 90026, 90039
- Area codes: 213, 323

Silverlake is a residential and commercial neighborhood in the central region of Los Angeles, California, United States, originally home to a small community called Ivanhoe, so named in honor of the 1819 novel by Walter Scott. In 1907, the Los Angeles Water Department built the Silverlake Reservoir, named for LA Water commissioner Herman Silver, giving the neighborhood its name. The area is now known for its architecturally significant homes, independently owned businesses, diverse restaurants, painted staircases, and creative environment.

== Geography and climate ==
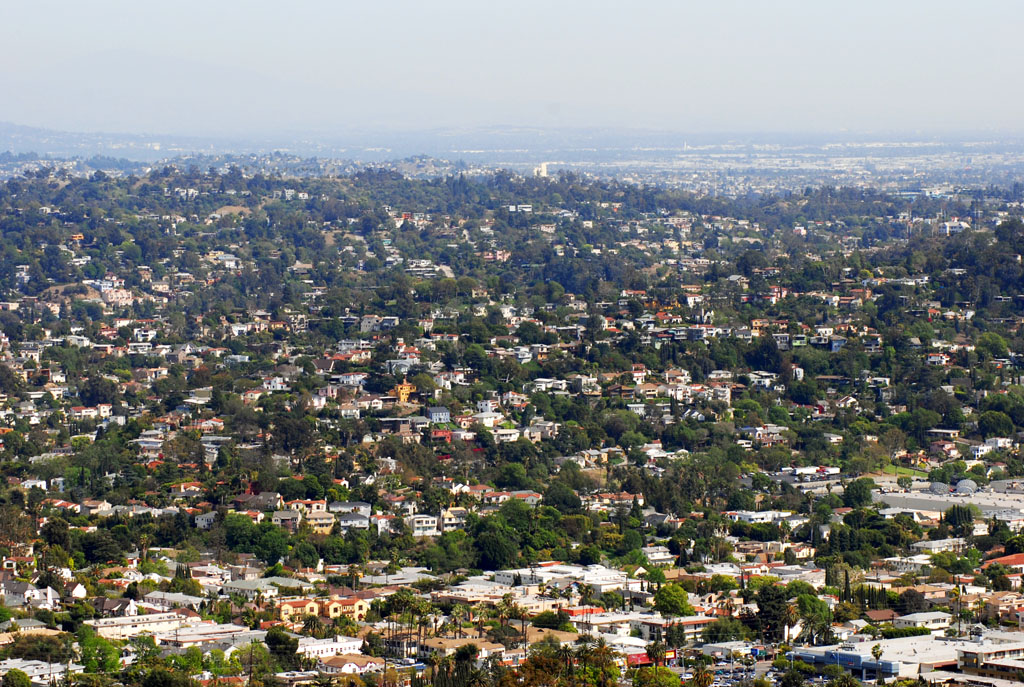
Silver Lake looking southeast from Los Feliz

Silverlake is flanked on the northeast by Atwater Village and Elysian Valley, on the southeast by Echo Park, on the southwest by Westlake, on the west by East Hollywood and on the northwest by Los Feliz.

Street and other boundaries are: the Los Angeles River between Glendale Boulevard and Fletcher Drive and Riverside Drive on the northeast, the Glendale Freeway on the east, Effie Street, Coronado Street, Berkeley Avenue and Fletcher Drive on the southeast, the Hollywood Freeway on the south, Virgil Avenue on the west and Fountain Avenue and Hyperion Avenue on the northwest.

The prime real estate around the Silver Lake Reservoir is known as Moreno Highlands. It was originally developed in the 1920s and 1930s by Daisy Canfield, wife of silent film star Antonio Moreno. Much of the Silverlake Residential Historic District is associated with this tract.

The Silverlake neighborhood council has mapped the boundaries of its council region.

Climate data for Silver Lake, Los Angeles
Month	Jan	Feb	Mar	Apr	May	Jun	Jul	Aug	Sep	Oct	Nov	Dec	Year
Mean daily maximum °F (°C)	67.5 (19.7)	67.8 (19.9)	69.2 (20.7)	71.8 (22.1)	73.5 (23.1)	77.0 (25.0)	81.9 (27.7)	83.4 (28.6)	82.3 (27.9)	77.8 (25.4)	72.2 (22.3)	67.1 (19.5)	74.3 (23.5)
Mean daily minimum °F (°C)	47.9 (8.8)	49.0 (9.4)	50.6 (10.3)	53.0 (11.7)	56.6 (13.7)	59.9 (15.5)	63.3 (17.4)	63.8 (17.7)	62.5 (16.9)	58.1 (14.5)	52.0 (11.1)	47.5 (8.6)	55.4 (13.0)
Average precipitation inches (mm)	3.64 (92)	4.05 (103)	3.44 (87)	0.89 (23)	0.35 (8.9)	0.08 (2.0)	0.02 (0.51)	0.14 (3.6)	0.35 (8.9)	0.49 (12)	1.23 (31)	2.04 (52)	16.72 (425)
Source 1:
Source 2:

== History ==
The area known as Ivanhoe to the north of the current reservoir was originally developed by Byram & Poindexter as early as 1887, named for Sir Walter Scott's book of the same name with many streets in that area referencing other works and characters of British literature such as Herkimer, Rowena, Kenilworth, Locksley, Ben Lomond, Hawick, and St. George.

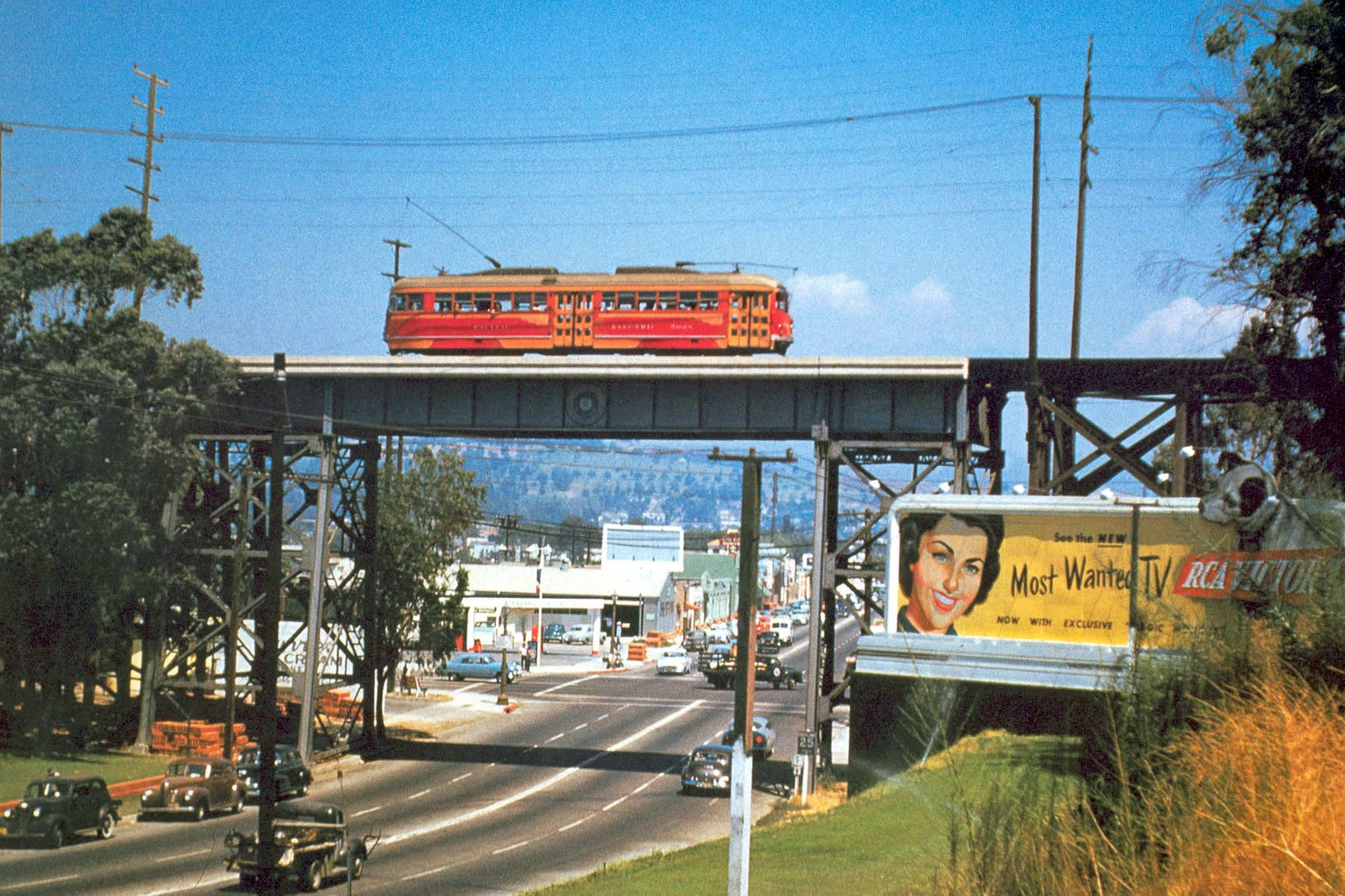
A Red Car crossing over Fletcher Drive c. 1955

In 1904 the Fletcher Drive Viaduct was constructed at the northeastern boundary of Silverlake for the Glendale Line of the Pacific Electric Railway Company, connecting the area to Downtown Los Angeles. Originally constructed of timber, the viaduct was replaced in 1928 by a steel span construction to make way for Fletcher Drive underneath it. It was demolished in 1959 and only its concrete footings remain.

William Mulholland identified the area as an ideal location to place emergency reservoirs for the rapidly growing city, building the upper Ivanhoe Reservoir in 1906 and the eponymous Silver Lake reservoir in 1907. The reservoir was named for former LA City Councilman and then City Water Commissioner Herman Silver, who was instrumental in gaining the approvals to purchase the 127 acres (51 ha) of land and the funding for the construction of the reservoir.

The hills of Ivanhoe and the neighboring Edendale had always attracted bohemians seeking safe haven from the prying eyes of polite society, and the further development of Silver Lake as a lush parkland only increased its appeal. The 1930s and 1940s saw artists, writers, actors and musicians join other progressives such as union organizers, civic activists, and communists flock to the area. With them came the area's modern aesthetics as architects such as Gregory Ain, Craig Ellwood, John Lautner, Rudolph Schindler, Walter Dorwin Teague, and Raphael Soriano designed their houses and businesses, creating what local realtors now point out as having more architecturally significant homes per square mile in Silverlake than in other parts of Los Angeles.

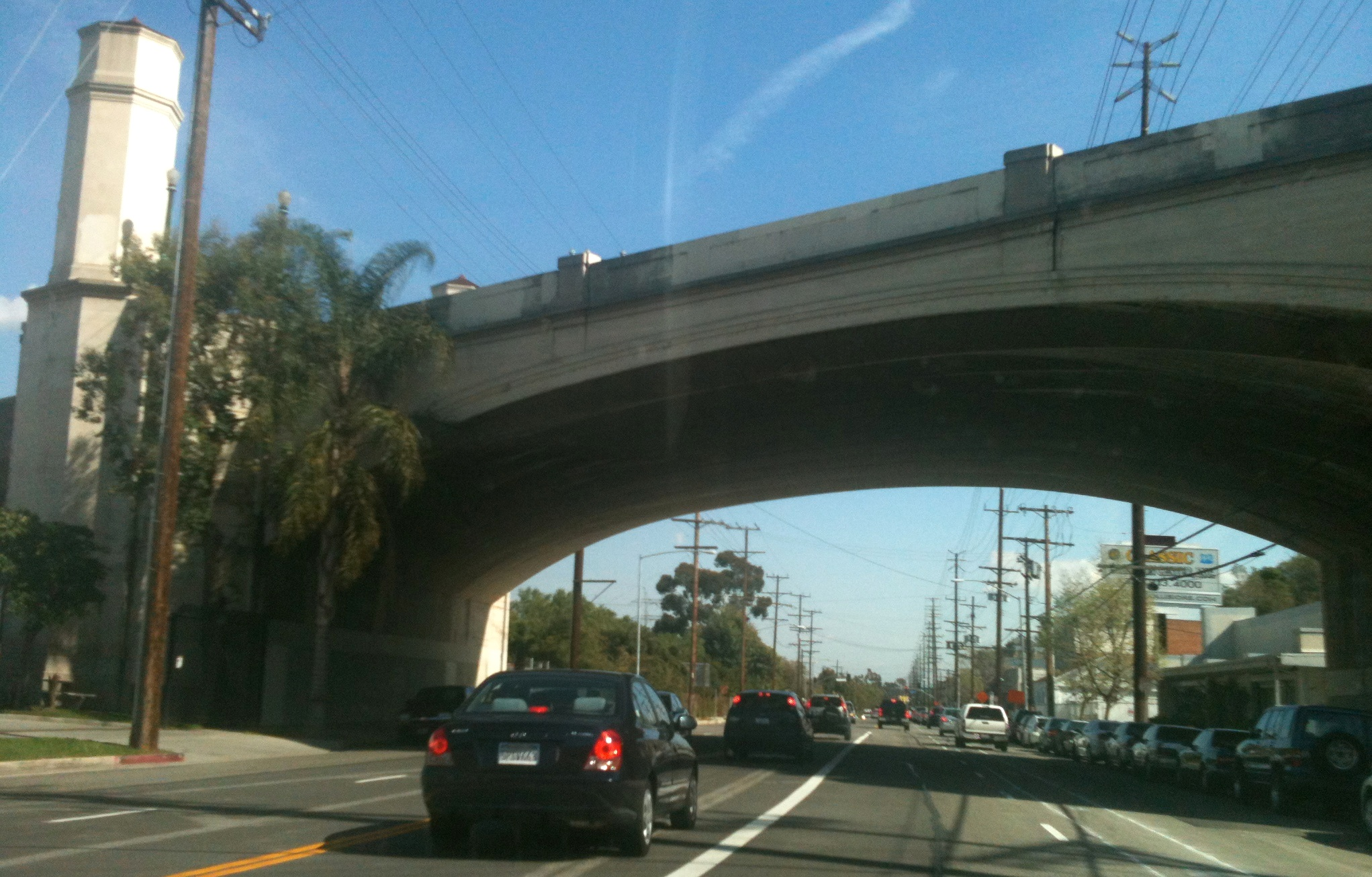
The Glendale-Hyperion Bridge in eastern Silverlake near the I-5 freeway

William Selig set up what may have been the first permanent film studio in Los Angeles in the Edendale neighborhood to the east of Ivanhoe valley in 1909, soon followed by Mack Sennett in 1912. Walt Disney's first studio was at the corner of Griffith Park Boulevard and Hyperion Avenue, currently the site of Gelson's Market. As a consequence, the name "Hyperion" is used by The Walt Disney Company and its subsidiaries, with company entities past and present carrying the name, such as Hyperion Books and the Hyperion Theater at Disney California Adventure Park. The fictional Seattle neighborhood of Hyperion Heights in the final season of the Disney-owned ABC series Once Upon a Time traces its name to the same origin.

William Fox bought Selig's former Edendale lot on Glendale Boulevard in the 1917, building a 12-acre (4.9 ha) backlot called Mixville for Western film star Tom Mix. The location is now known as the Mixville Shopping Center and occupied by a Whole Foods Market. It is rumored that Mix buried his horse "Old Blue" on the property.

The neighborhood is crisscrossed by numerous municipal staircases that provide pedestrian access up and down the neighborhood's signature hills. Among these are the Descanso Stairs, Redcliff Stairs and the Music Box Stairs. The flight of stairs in Laurel and Hardy's film The Music Box is located between lower Descanso Drive and Vendome Street, as it winds up and around the hill.

In the 1940s, Chinese-American architect Eugene Kinn Choy sought to build a house for his family in Silverlake, but due to racial covenants still in effect prohibiting the sale of property to "any person not of the Caucasian race," he was prevented from doing so. He went door to door to seek the approval of every house in the neighborhood before he was given approval to build in 1949.

Choy's groundbreaking efforts opened the door to the Asian American and Latino communities in the 1950s and 1960s. Beginning in the 1970s, the neighborhood became the nexus of Los Angeles' gay leather subculture, similar to the SoMA neighborhood in San Francisco. Since the late 1990s, gentrification has changed the area by pushing out public sex and "gay cruising" and facilitating the opening of many independent upscale boutiques, coffee shops, fitness studios, and restaurants.

The community continues to evolve, incorporating its bohemian roots with its racial and sexual diversity of the mid-20th century as architects such as Barbara Bestor and Gustavo Gubel, artists such as cache and Eric Junker, and musicians like Moby and Flea continue to define Silverlake’s environment as a cultural and creative enclave.

=== LGBT+ community ===
==== Early history ====
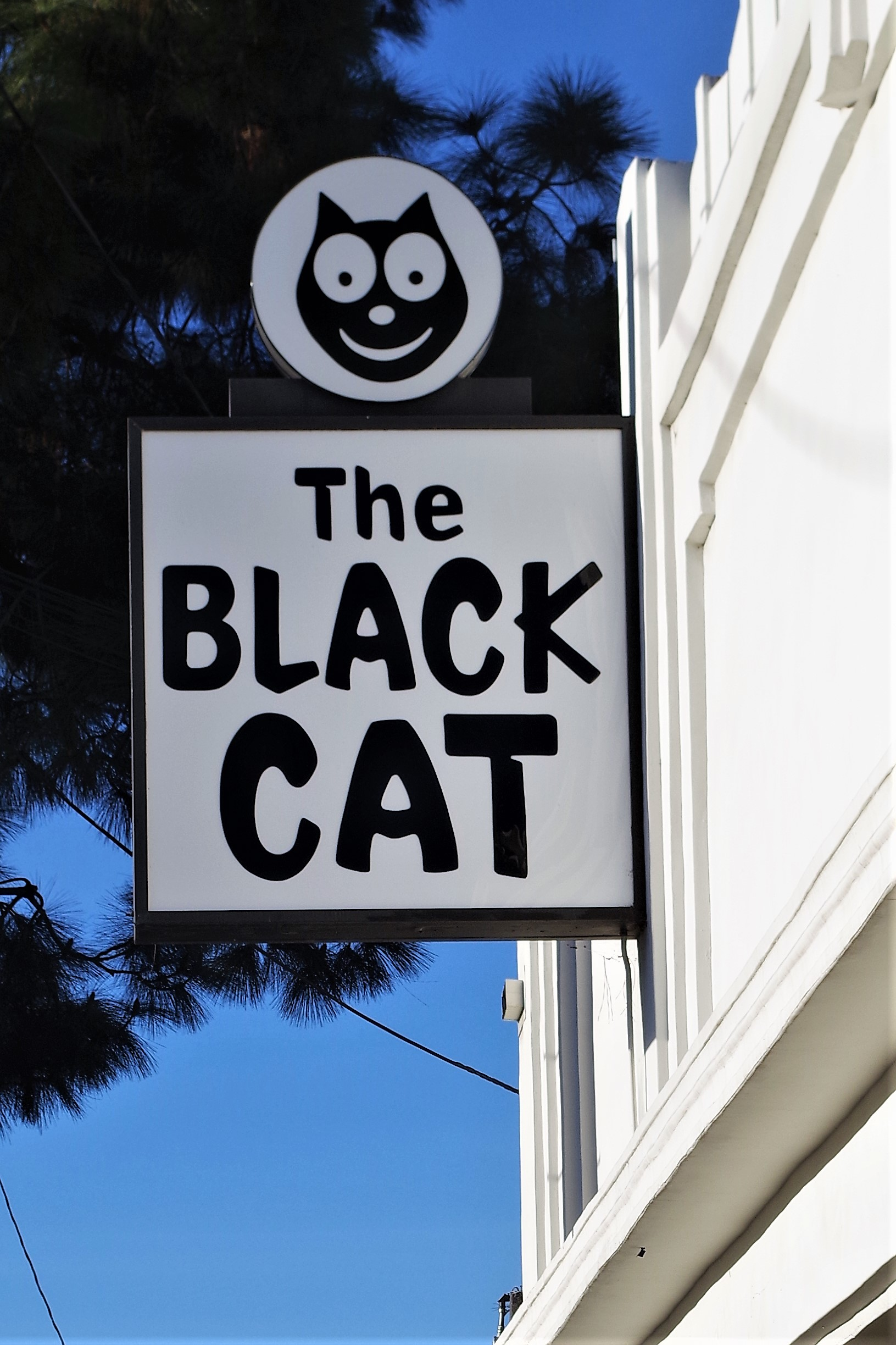
The Black Cat gay bar, site of a controversial 1967 police raid

In the 1930s, Silverlake and Echo Park still comprised Edendale and acted as a space where members of the LGBT community were able to express their identities. Prominent drag queen Julian Eltinge built his house in Silver Lake and performed until the city passed laws criminalizing cross-dressing, after which he continued to recount his drag performances to audiences.

Silverlake was also home to Harry Hay, credited with founding the first gay organization, the Mattachine Society, which began as Bachelors' Anonymous. Hay lived and had meetings in Silverlake at the time the group began in 1950. Kevin Roderick wrote in his eulogy for Hay in Los Angeles that many consider the house located near Silver Lake to be the birthplace of the gay-rights movement. A staircase by the house is designated the Mattachine Steps.

==== Queer liberation ====
The Black Cat Tavern, a fairly popular bar that has now become a historic-cultural monument, was the site of a police raid in 1967 that spread to adjacent bars, becoming a full-blown riot, which resulted in more than a dozen arrests. The protests in response to the raid predated the Stonewall riots by two years.

Beginning in the 1970s, the neighborhood became the nexus of Los Angeles' gay leather subculture.

==== HIV/AIDS epidemic ====
As the HIV/AIDS epidemic gripped the US in the 1980s, tensions between gay men and the Los Angeles Police Department escalated. Several LGBT activists in Silverlake claimed they felt unsafe reporting hate crimes against them to the police, who they felt harbored anti-LGBT sentiments. Their complaints grew to the point that then-City Council member Michael Woo advocated establishing a hotline to relay information to police indirectly and compile statistics on the frequency of gay-bashings. Some bath houses, which acted as social spaces for gay men, were shut down by the city government in an effort to curb the spread of the virus. The ensuing controversy reflected a nationwide debate about whether this type of action constituted public health policy or perpetuation of discrimination against the LGBT community.

Circus of Books was a bookstore and gay pornography shop that was notable as a gay cruising spot in the 1980s.

The 1993 documentary Silverlake Life: The View from Here recorded the experience of a gay couple diagnosed with HIV.

==== Gentrification ====
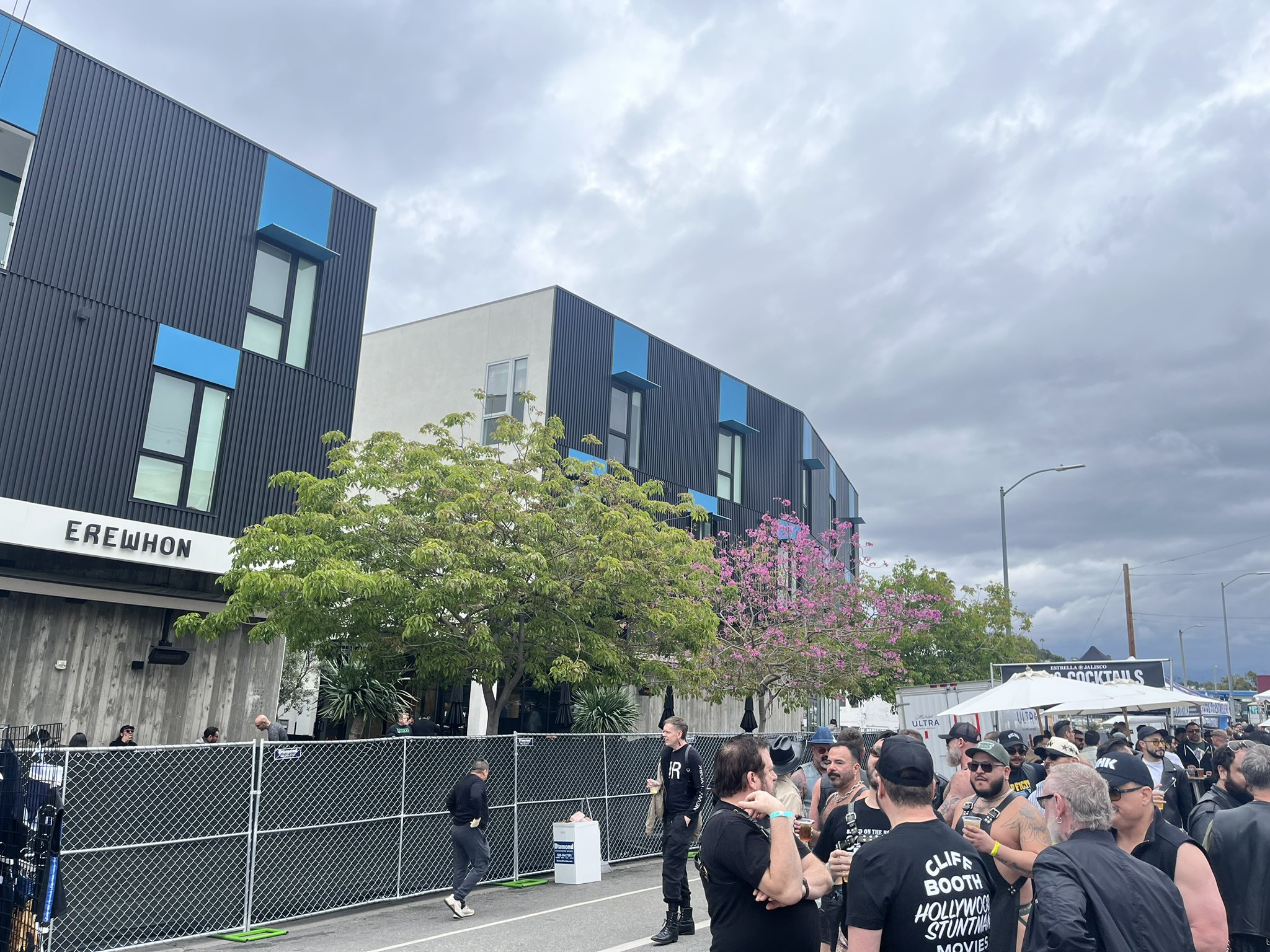
2025 Off Sunset Festival held next to an Erewhon store location, contrasting the longstanding LGBT+ community with recent gentrification

Beginning in the 1990s, gentrification changed the area by pushing out cruising for sex.

In 1992, about 85 activists protested gay-bashing and violent acts against homosexuals in the area, carrying banners emblazoned with "Stop the Violence" along Sunset Boulevard.

Gay bar Akbar opened on New Year's Eve 1995. In 2004, fearing displacement through gentrification, the bar's owners purchased the building and converted the neighboring unit into a dance floor.

Since 2006, Eagle LA has served as a popular gathering point for the local gay leather subculture. Its location was home to several prior gay bars: Shed (1968–1972), Outcast (1972–1983), and Gauntlet II (1983–2005).

Beginning in 2011, the City of Los Angeles removed anti-cruising traffic signs installed in Silver Lake, but additional such signs were identified and removed in 2024.

In response to gentrification and the closure of several local gay bars, the Off Sunset Festival was launched in 2013 to celebrate the neighborhood's rich LGBT+ history.

In 2019, Maebe A. Girl became the first drag queen ever elected to public office in the United States, joining the Silverlake Neighborhood Council.

== Reservoir ==
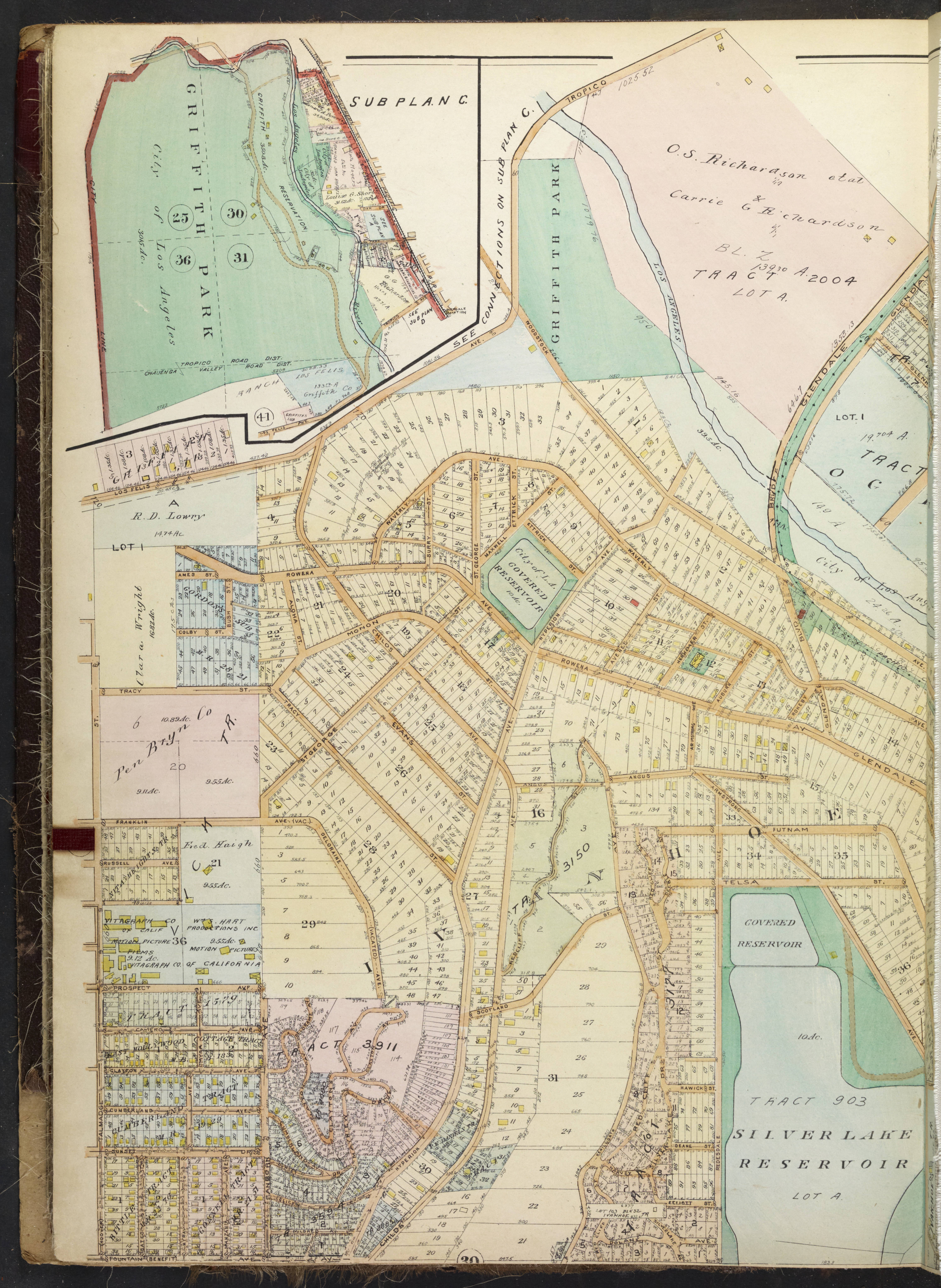
Silver Lake Reservoir and environs, 1921

The neighborhood was named for Water Board Commissioner Herman Silver, who was instrumental in the creation of the Silver Lake Reservoir in the neighborhood, one of the water storage reservoirs established as part of the controversial Los Angeles Aqueduct project in the early 1900s. This is one of ten that still remain in Los Angeles.

In the community of Silver Lake lies the namesake reservoir composed of two basins, with the lower named Silver Lake and the upper named Ivanhoe. The lower body of water was named in 1906 for Herman Silver; the upper body received its name from the 1819 Sir Walter Scott novel Ivanhoe. In 1989 the City of Los Angeles, Cultural Heritage Commission, Cultural Affairs Department declared both reservoirs Historic-Cultural Monument No. 422.

The reservoirs are owned and maintained by the Los Angeles Department of Water and Power (DWP) and provided water to 600,000 homes in downtown and South Los Angeles until 2013 when federal water quality regulations mandated reservoirs be covered; The Headworks Reservoir complex replaced the Silver Lake and Ivanhoe reservoirs with two underground reservoirs, Headworks East and Headworks West located north of Griffith Park.

Also within the grounds of the reservoir are several popular recreational facilities: the Silverlake Recreation Center, which includes an adjacent city park; the 2.25-mile (3.62 km) Silverlake Walking Path, which circumnavigates the reservoirs; two enclosed dog parks, and the Silverlake Meadow, modeled after NYC's Central Park Sheep Meadow. On the northeast corner of the property is the Neighborhood Nursery School, which since 1976 has been at the corner of Tesla Avenue and Silver Lake Boulevard. It is a parent-participation cooperative preschool, affiliated with the California Council of Parent Participation Nursery Schools.

== Government ==
As of 2024, Silverlake is represented by Los Angeles City Council Members Hugo Soto-Martinez and Nithya Raman and the Silver Lake Neighborhood Council. The Silver Lake Neighborhood Council (SLNC) was formed in the early 2000s and certified as part of the City of Los Angeles Neighborhood Council system in February 2003. Its 21-member governing board is elected for two-year terms in September. Recent projects have included "Street Medallions" created by artist Cheri Gaulke, "ArtCans", the "Electrical Art Box Project", and the second annual "Make Music LA" created by several different artists, groups, and the SLNC Arts & Culture Committee.

The Silverlake Residents Association, the Silverlake Improvement Association, the Silverlake Reservoirs Conservancy, and the Silverlake Chamber of Commerce are all active in the area.

== Demographics ==
The 2010 U.S. census counted 37,019 residents in the 2.75 square miles (7.1 km^{2}) neighborhood—an average of 11.99k people per square mile, ranking Silverlake 38th in population density among 121 Los Angeles Neighborhoods. The median age for residents was 35, about average for Los Angeles, but the percentages of residents aged 19 to 49 were among the county's highest.

The neighborhood was highly diverse ethnically. The population was 42.9% Non-Hispanic White, 35.8% Hispanic or Latino, 15.1% Asians and Asian Americans, 3.4% Black, and 2.7% mixed race or of other origins. The most common foreign place of birth was elsewhere in the Americas (57.9%), including Mexico (22.7%), El Salvador (17.6%), Guatemala (8.4%), Colombia (1.7%), and Nicaragua (1.5%); followed by Asia (32.6%), with the Philippines (19.2%) being the most common Asian place of birth. Residents born in the United States comprised 67.4% of the neighborhood's population, slightly higher than the 64.4% average for Los Angeles County.

The median yearly household income in 2010 dollars was $74,587, approximately 44.7% higher than the $51,538 median household income for Los Angeles. By neighborhood track, medians can range from $42,991 to $135,011 depending on location. The average household size of 2.3 people was low for the city. Renters occupied 64.3% of the housing stock, and house or apartment owners the rest.

The percentages of never-married men (55.8%) and women (49.0%) were among the county's highest.

== Education ==
The majority of residents (56.8%) aged 25 years and older have obtained a higher degree, compared to the 38.5% for Los Angeles in general.

=== Schools ===
The schools within Silverlake are as follows:

- Allesandro Elementary School, public K–5, 2210 Riverside Drive
- Bellevue Primary School, public K–1, 610 North Micheltorena Street
- Clifford Street Elementary School, public K–5, 2150 Duane Street
- Ivanhoe Elementary School, public K–5, 2828 Herkimer Street
- Kids' World School, private K–12, 2132 Hyperion Avenue
- Micheltorena Street Elementary School, public K–6, 1511 Micheltorena Street
- Neighborhood Nursery School, non-profit pre-K, 2700 Tesla Avenue
- St. Francis of Assisi Elementary School, parochial K–8, 1550 Maltman Avenue (closed in 2021)
- St. Teresa of Avila Elementary School, parochial K–8, 2215 Fargo Street
- Thomas Starr King Middle School, public 6–8, 4201 Fountain Avenue

=== Library ===
The Silverlake District is also served by the Silverlake Branch of the Los Angeles Public Library. It is located at 2411 Glendale Boulevard, in northeastern Silverlake between the reservoir and the I-5 freeway.

== Entertainment and nightlife ==
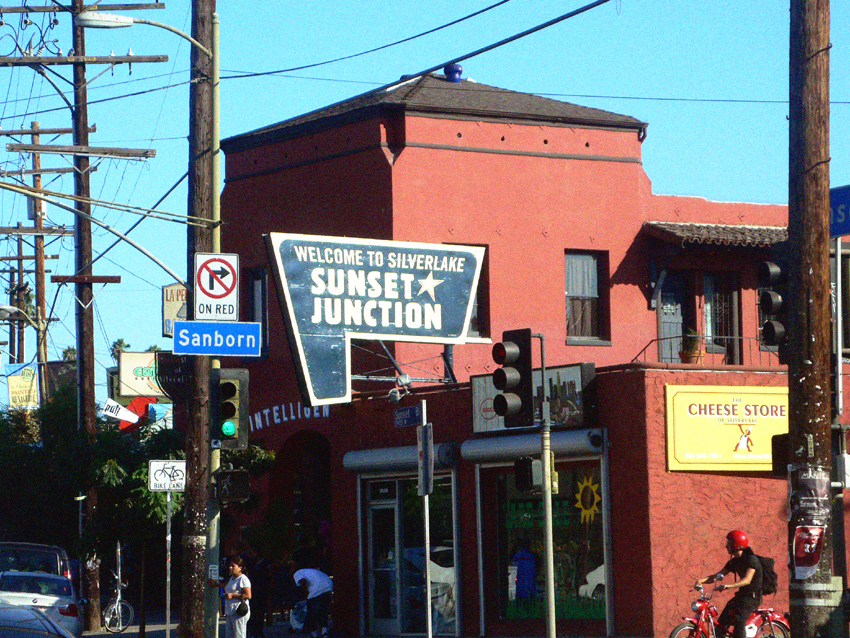
Sunset Junction

Silverlake known as one of "the city's hippest neighborhoods", has many bars, nightclubs and restaurants. Since the 1990s, the neighborhood has become the center of the alternative and indie rock scene in Los Angeles. It was home to two major yearly street festivals: the Silverlake Jubilee, held in May and the Sunset Junction Street Fair, held in August. The last Sunset Junction festival was held in 2010 and abruptly cancelled in 2011 just days before it was supposed to take place, after years of neighborhood controversy. The Silverlake Jubilee, the more recent addition, featured live music by local musicians, local artists and community businesses. It moved to the Arts District and changed its name to the Jubilee Music and Arts Festival in 2013. Local music venues include the Silverlake Lounge.

A comparison has been drawn between New York City's Williamsburg neighborhood and Silverlake which has been called the "Williamsburg of the West".

The Micheltorena Steps draws visitors looking for prime selfie shots since it was painted with hearts and bright colors ("Stair Candy") in 2015.

== Notable residents ==
- Fred Armisen, actor
- Skylar Astin, actor/singer
- David Michael Barrett, screenwriter/producer
- Beck, musician
- Amir Blumenfeld, comedian
- Carroll Borland, actor/professor
- David Edward Byrd, graphic artist
- Eddie Cahill, actor
- Joey Castillo, musician/drummer
- Sal Castro, educator/activist
- Eugene Kinn Choy, architect
- Rob Corddry, comedian
- Ernest E. Debs, Los Angeles politician
- Zach de la Rocha, singer
- Mac DeMarco, musician
- Lisa Edelstein, actor
- Jack Falahee, actor
- Flea, musician, co-founder of Silverlake Conservatory of Music
- James Franco, actor
- Judy Garland, actor
- Mike Gatto, politician
- Crispin Glover, actor
- Donald Glover, musician/comedian/actor
- Joseph Gordon-Levitt, actor
- Ryan Gosling, actor
- Kevin Griffin, musician
- Alex Gruenenfelder, filmmaker and author
- Kim Gruenenfelder, author
- Christopher Guanlao, musician
- Hannah Hart, internet personality
- The Haxan Cloak (real name Bobby Krlic), musician
- Harry Hay, gay rights activist
- Grace Helbig, internet personality, comedian
- James Leo Herlihy, novelist and playwright
- Sandrine Holt, actor
- James Eads How, hobo organizer
- Mikel Jollett, musician
- Gilbert Leong, architect and banker
- Jenny Lewis, actor/singer-songwriter
- Anna Lunoe, musician
- Janet MacLachlan, actor
- Ann Magnuson, actor
- Ricardo Flores Magón, Mexican anarchist and social reform activist
- Mako, actor
- Effa Manley, Negro League sports executive
- Laura Marling, musician
- Rachel McAdams, actor
- Tom Mix, actor
- Moby, musician and owner of Little Pine
- Antonio Moreno, silent movie star
- Johnette Napolitano, singer
- Richard Neutra, architect
- Anaïs Nin, author
- William H. Parker, Los Angeles police chief
- Cassandra Peterson, actor
- Maria Rasputin, memoirist
- Christina Ricci, actor
- Arabella Page Rodman (1868–1955), civic leader
- Rob Schnapf, producer
- Pauly Shore, actor
- Randy Sklar, actor/comedian
- Brian Smith, director, producer, and screenwriter
- Joey Soloway, TV and film writer and director
- Kiefer Sutherland, actor
- Alberto Valdés, painter
- Butch Vig, musician and record producer
- Gerard Way, musician and comic book artist
- Kristen Wiig, actor
- Delbert E. Wong, LA Superior Court Judge
- Dan C. Wright, musician and producer
- Constance Wu, actor
- Benjamin Wynn, composer and music producer
- Milo Yiannopoulos, writer, speaker
- Rob Zabrecky, performer
- Nithya Raman, Mayor-elect for Los Angeles

== See also ==
- List of Los Angeles Historic-Cultural Monuments in Silver Lake, Angelino Heights, and Echo Park
