= Sunset Junction =

Informal portion of Silver Lake, Los Angeles

Coordinates: 34.0924°N 118.2804°W

Sunset Junction is an informal name for a portion of the Silver Lake district of Los Angeles, California. It was home to the Sunset Junction Street Fair from 1980 through 2010. It is in the southwestern part of the district along Sunset Boulevard.

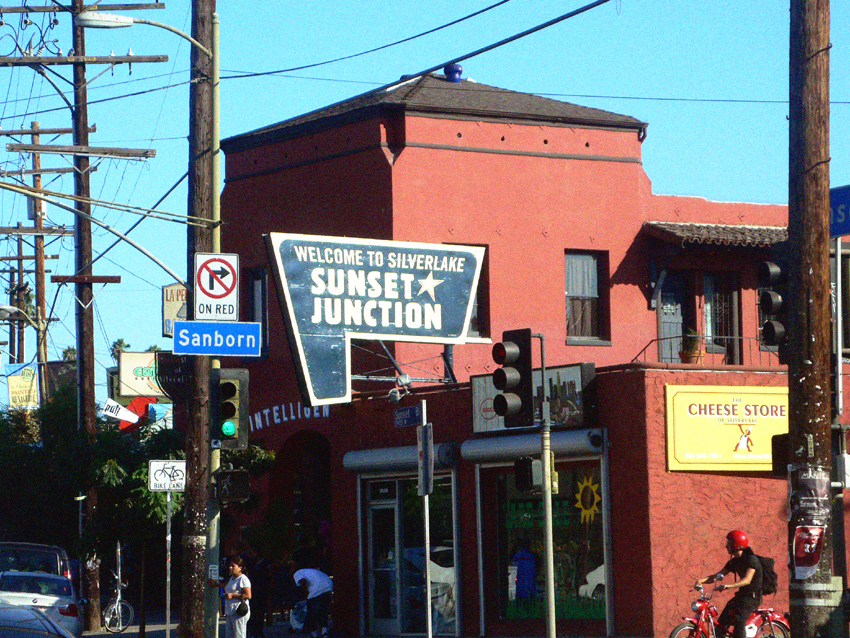
Sunset Junction

The name refers to the street junction of Sunset Boulevard and Santa Monica Boulevard, two of the largest streets in Los Angeles, both of which travel from Sunset Junction to the Pacific Ocean. For most of their distance, the streets run parallel, but join here where they intersect Sanborn Avenue and where Santa Monica Blvd ends.

== History ==
=== Streetcar era ===
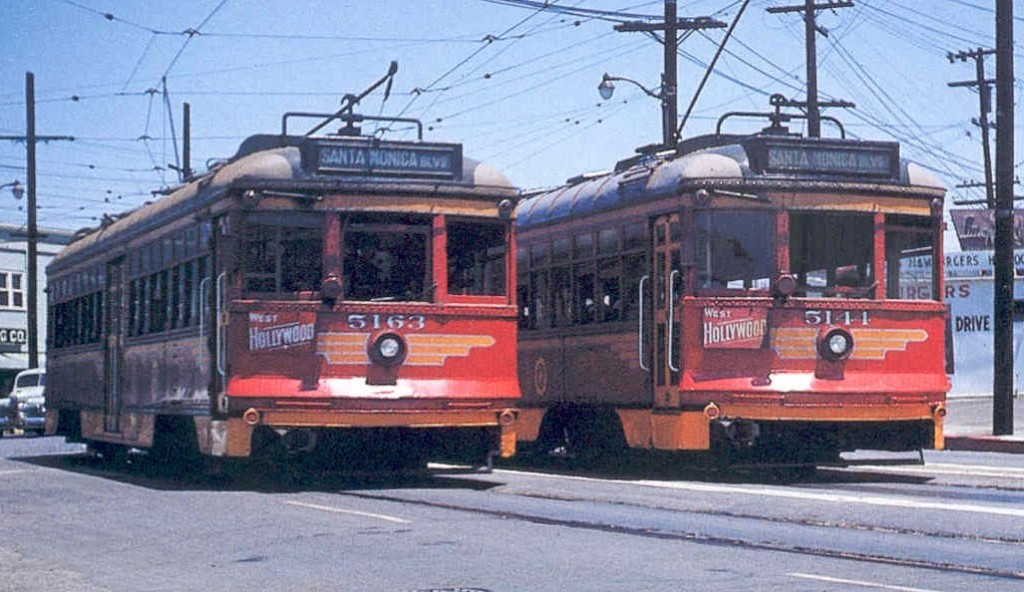
Pacific Electric Hollywood Line Streetcars at Sunset Junction (circa 1952)

Originally the junction was formed by the branching of two interurban railway lines and was known as Sanborn or Hollywood Junction. In 1895, the Pasadena and Pacific Railway Company built an interurban rail line from downtown Los Angeles to Santa Monica, whose route ran along Sunset Boulevard as far as Sanborn Avenue, where it turned west along the present alignment of Santa Monica Boulevard. In 1905, the Los Angeles Pacific Railway, successor to the Pasadena and Pacific, built a new branch northwest along Sunset Boulevard from Sanborn Avenue as a shortcut to its existing line on Hollywood Boulevard, forming the junction that is still reflected in the existing street configuration. The Los Angeles Pacific Company was one of the eight rail companies merged in 1911 to form the Pacific Electric Railway.

The junction continued to serve the streetcar network until the 1950s. On May 31, 1953, Pacific Electric shuttered its South Hollywood–Sherman Line, which traveled on Santa Monica Boulevard. Streetcars on the Hollywood Line, which traveled on Sunset Boulevard, used the junction until September 26, 1954, when buses replaced streetcars.

=== Center of LGBT+ activism ===
Sunset Junction is the site of one of the first actions in the nation against police activity in gay bars, the Black Cat Tavern protest, which began on February 11, 1967, almost two and a half years before the more famous protest at the Stonewall Inn in New York's Greenwich Village. The event is named for the Black Cat Tavern, formerly at 3909 Sunset Blvd between Sanborn and Hyperion Avenues, a location that had been a gay bar periodically since the 1940s. Organized in response to a police raid on the Black Cat on New Year's Eve 1966, in which several people were hurt, the protest was planned to coincide with similar actions at African-American, Latino and “hippie” establishments around the city, which were also regularly patrolled. Of these, the protest at the Black Cat was most successful, with over 200 people marching without any violent confrontation. The Black Cat protest continued for several days but did not attract the media attention that the protests at the Stonewall Inn later did.

For many years Silver Lake housed a small, quiet gay and lesbian population, but in the 1970s a combination of affordable housing, a bohemian ambiance and promotion by gay real estate agents caused the gay and lesbian population to swell to more than 20% of the neighborhood total.

In 1979, an early literary gay and lesbian bookstores, A Different Light, was founded at 4014 Santa Monica Boulevard. The store functioned as a focal point for the community and was the site of readings by noted authors, including Christopher Isherwood, Allen Ginsberg, William Burroughs and Larry Kramer. Subsequently, additional branches were opened in West Hollywood (1990), San Francisco, and Greenwich Village in Manhattan. The original store closed in 1992, as have the branches in Greenwich Village, West Hollywood, and San Francisco.

Tensions in the 1970s between the growing LGBT+ population and working-class Latino families in the neighborhood led the Sunset Junction Neighborhood Alliance to organize the first Sunset Junction Street Fair in 1980.

During the 1980s, the neighborhood was hit hard by HIV/AIDS, and communities of color, including Latinos, were disproportionately affected. Gay and Lesbian Latinos Unidos (GLLU) responded by creating a Latino-focused community health organization, Bienestar Human Services, which had an office at Sunset Junction.

Throughout the 1980s and 1990s, The Black Cat's former space was used by a series of gay bars:

- The Bushwacker (1982)
- Tabasco's (1983–1984)
- Basgo's Disco (1984–1993)
- Le Barcito (1993–2011)

=== Modern history ===
By the early 2000s, the area had begun to gentrify.

Third-wave coffee coffee arrived in the area with the 2007 opening of an Intelligentsia Coffee & Tea location.

In 2012, a new restaurant and bar named The Black Cat opened in the same location as the original establishment.

Partially in response to the area's gentrification, the annual Off Sunset Festival — a kink, leather subculture, and alternative sexuality street fair — launched in 2013. The event is held on Santa Monica Boulevard, just "off" Sunset Boulevard.

By 2014, the area was considered upscale, and had been dubbed "the Williamsburg of the West." La Colombe Coffee Roasters opened a Sunset Junction location in 2017.

Though Sunset Junction was once known for its small businesses, the area has seen an increase in chain businesses. In 2022, the fast food restaurant chain Shake Shack opened a location — which ultimately closed in 2024 — in the unit adjoining The Black Cat and placed three large signs on the historic duplex, dominating much of the Art Deco building with its branding. Silver Lake Neighborhood Councilmember Maebe A. Girl called the changes "a slap in the face," noting the company's links to anti-LGBT politicians. In 2023, ice cream chain Salt & Straw also opened a location in the area, creating controversy due to its proximity to a longtime gelateria.

Sunset Junction has also become known as a "fragrance hotspot," with perfume brands such as Byredo and Le Labo opening boutiques in the neighborhood.
