= Off Sunset Festival =

Annual street fair in Los Angeles, California

- Frequency: Annual
- Locations: Silver Lake, Los Angeles, United States of America
- Inaugurated: 2013
- Website: www.offsunsetfestival.com

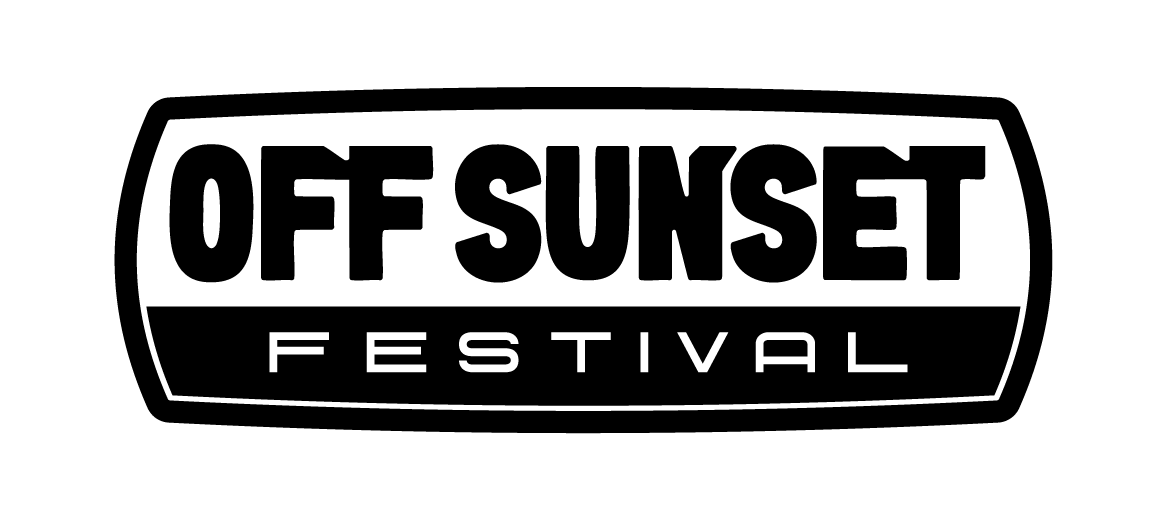
Off Sunset Festival logo

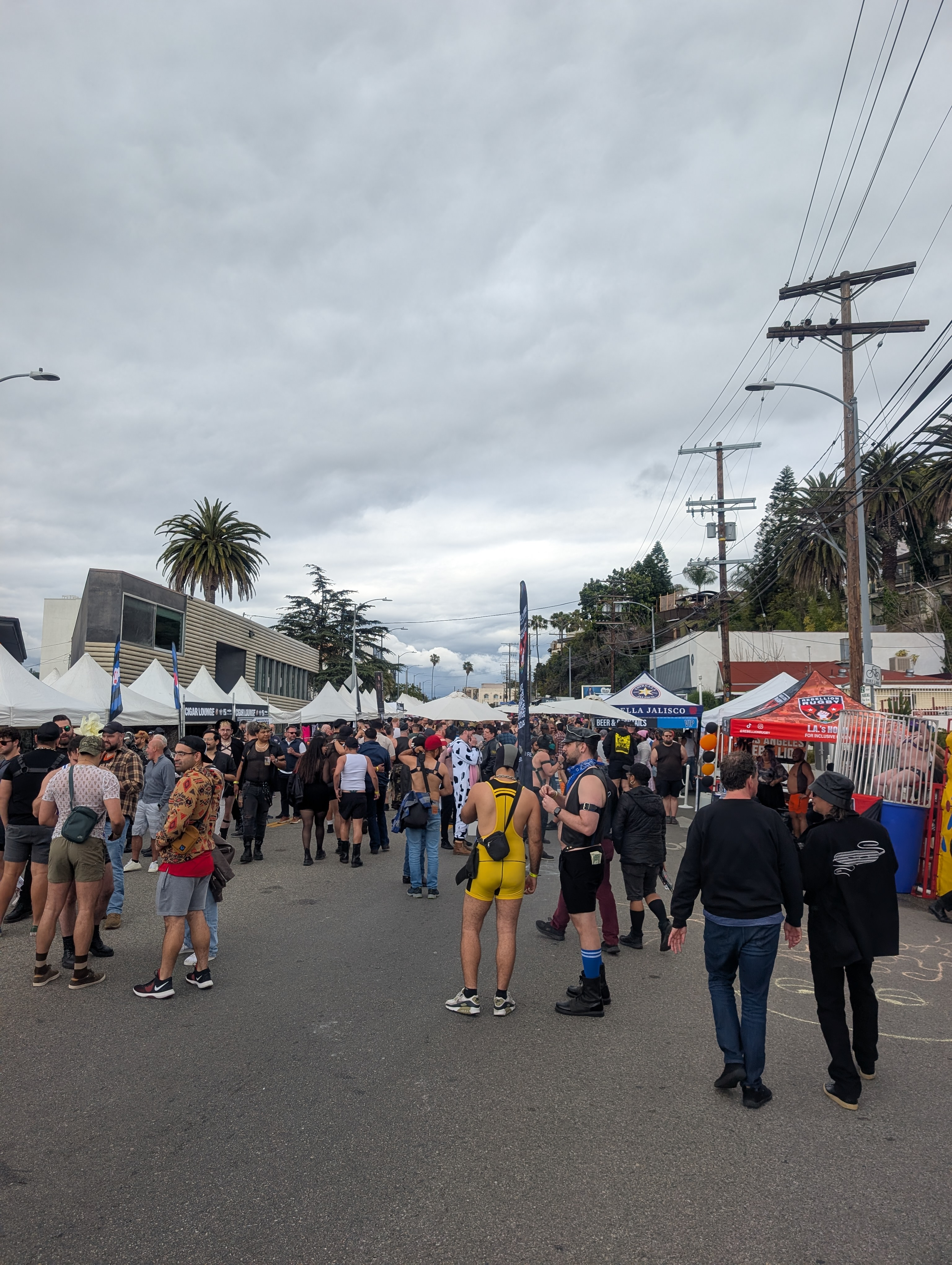
Off Sunset Festival crowd on April 27, 2025

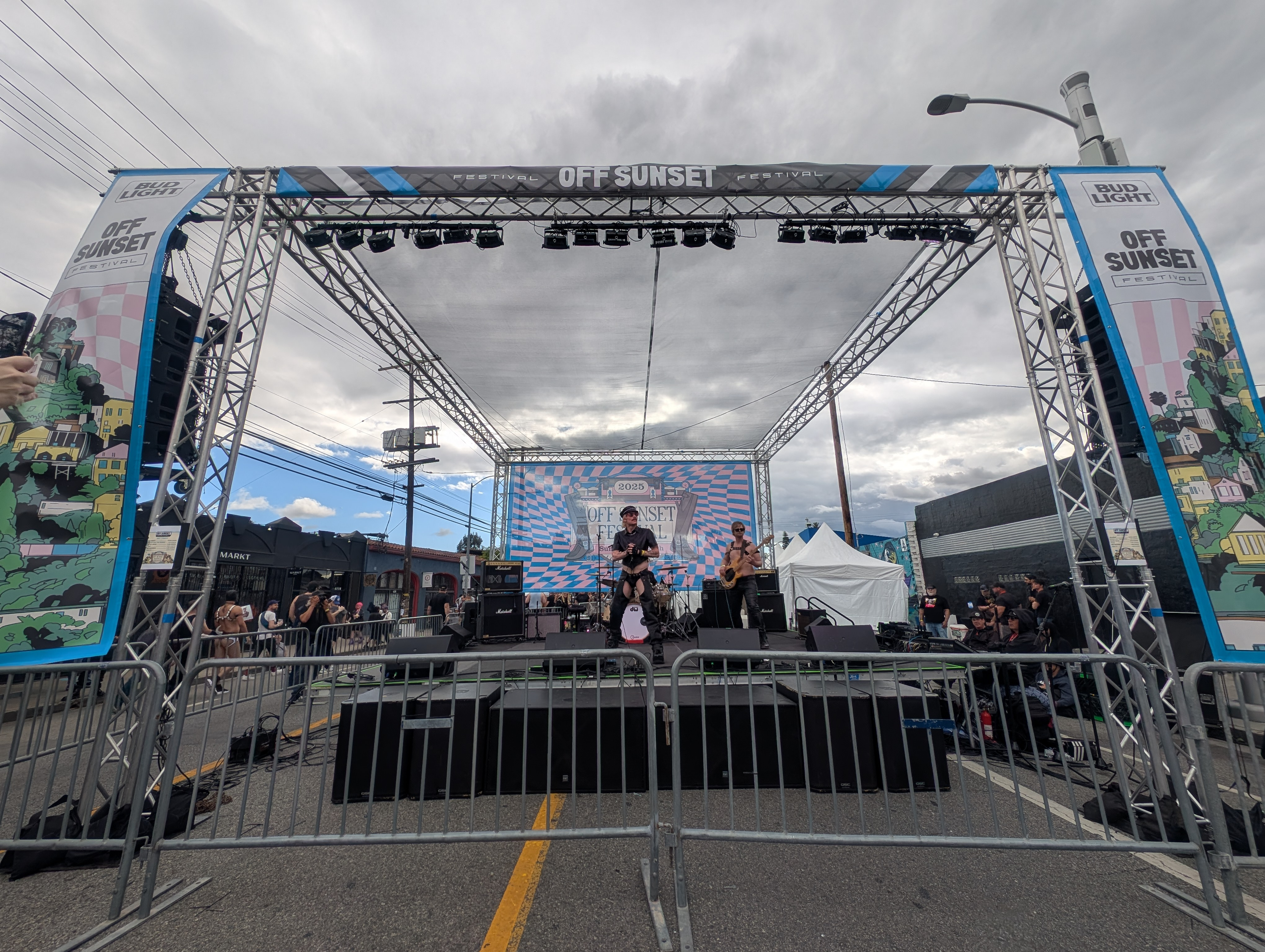
Stage at Off Sunset Festival 2025

Off Sunset Festival is an annual kink, leather subculture, and alternative sexuality street fair in Los Angeles, California. The event has historically served as the conclusion to Los Angeles Leather Pride in March, but beginning in 2025, has been moved to late April in favor of milder weather. The event, sometimes referred to simply as "Off Sunset", takes place on Santa Monica Boulevard in Silver Lake, just 'off' Sunset Boulevard. The event is considered by some to be the spiritual successor to the Sunset Junction Street Fair, which was last held in 2010. The 2026 event will be held on Sunday, May 3.

The Off Sunset Festival Community Grant Program rewards select local non-profit organizations that offer community services and beneficial programs in Silver Lake and surrounding areas. As of 2025, the program has donated more than $25,000 to such groups, including Los Angeles Rebellion, Silverlake Conservatory of Music and TransCanWork.

== History ==
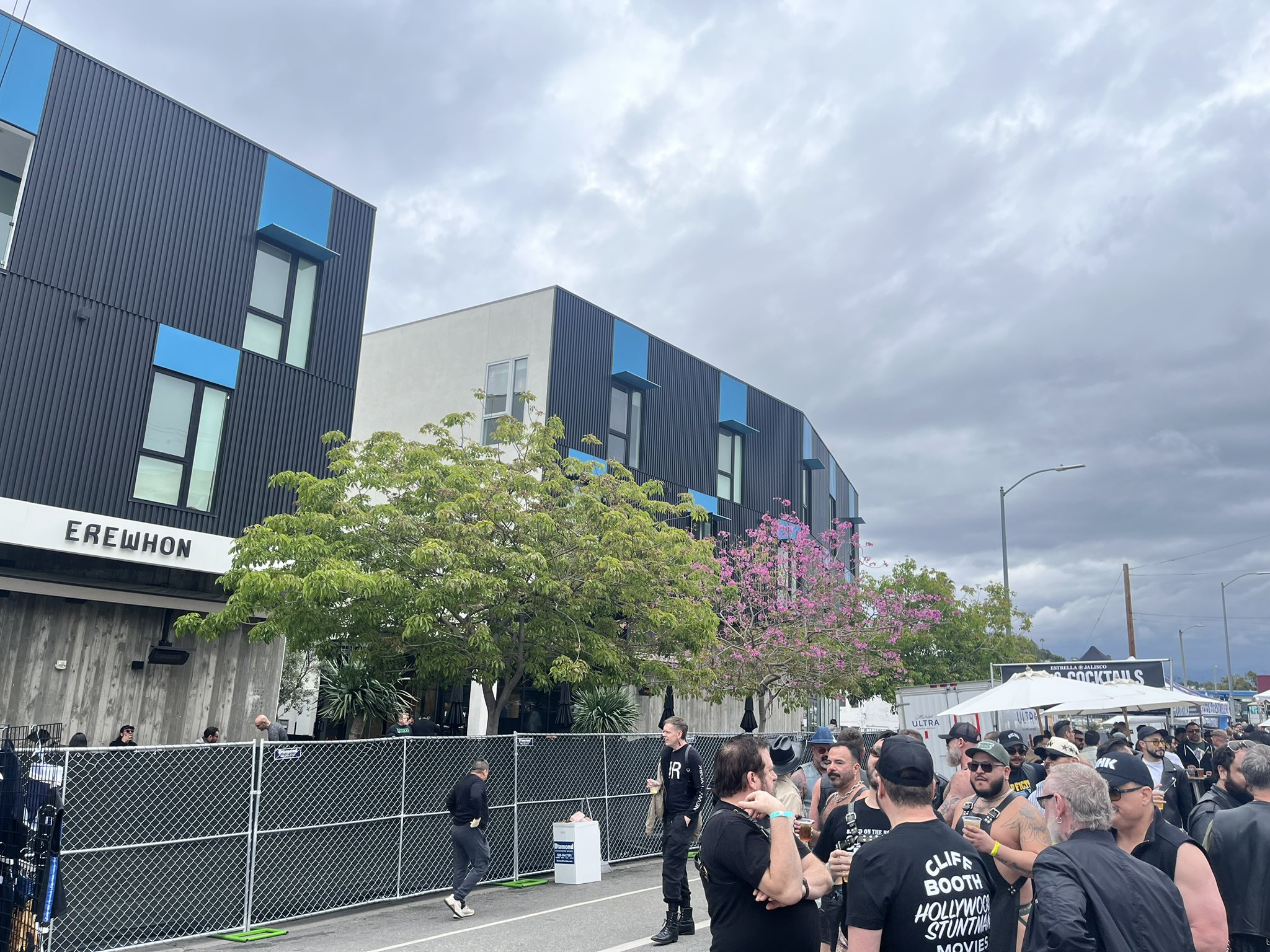
2025 Off Sunset Festival held next to an Erewhon store, contrasting the longstanding LGBT+ community with recent gentrification

In response to gentrification and the closure of several local gay bars in Silver Lake, Los Angeles, Off Sunset Festival was launched in 2013 to celebrate the neighborhood's rich LGBT+ history. One of the event planners, Hunter Fox, has noted that "From the neighborhood-uniting mission that inspired Sunset Junction to the Black Cat being declared a Los Angeles Historic-Cultural Monument, we have seen much strife turn to progress in our community. We want this to be a celebration of who we are, where we live and how far we've all come together."

The event is held in collaboration with local leather bar Eagle LA.

== See also ==
- Off Sunset Festival
- Folsom Street Fair
- Sunset Junction Street Fair
