= Bobby Matos =

American jazz musician (1941–2017)

Bobby Matos (July 24, 1941 – November 11, 2017) was an American Latin jazz percussionist.

== Life and career ==
Bobby Matos was born in the Bronx, New York on July 24, 1941. He began playing music by hitting pots and pans in his grandmother's apartment. As a youth, he studied with conga drum masters Patato Valdez and Mongo Santamaría. While playing all over New York, he was encouraged to play timbales by Willie Bobo and Tito Puente and in the late 60s attended The New School and the Manhattan School of Music. Around this time, he recorded "My Latin Soul" for Phillips International Records, which made his reputation as a bandleader.

Matos toured and recorded with artists Ben Vereen, Bette Midler, Fred Neil, Jim Croce, Joe Loco, Ray Rivera, Miriam Makeba, and scores of others. He had an extensive discography and 5 critically acclaimed albums with Ubiquity Records. One of his last records was "Gratitude" on the LifeForce jazz label.

Bobby Matos died of cancer in Los Angeles, on November 11, 2017, at the age of 76.
