= Very Be Careful =

- Origin: Los Angeles, California, United States
- Genres: Cumbia, Vallenato
- Years active: 1997–present
- Labels: Downtown Pijao, Treasure Bottle
- Members: Ricardo Guzman; Arturo Guzman; Craig Martin; Dante Ruiz; Richard Panta

Very Be Careful (VBC) is a Los Angeles band that plays Colombian vallenato music, a traditional cumbia sound that centers around the accordion, backed with percussion and bass. The group was started in 1998 in Los Angeles by accordionist Ricardo "Ricky G" Guzman and his bass playing brother Arturo "Brickems" Guzman. They were soon joined by Richard "Mil Caras" Panta on Caja Vallenata, Craig "Peabody" Martín on Guacharaca and Dante "The Rip" Ruiz on Cowbell.

They have independently released 7 full-length studio albums mixed with equal parts traditional covers and original material. They have also toured to Japan playing one of the largest festivals there with over 100,000 people attending in 2005, The Fuji Rock Festival as well as the Glastonbury Festival, the largest in the UK. In 2006, Very Be Careful completed a European tour.

== Discography ==
Date of Release	Title	Label
Albums
1998	El Niño	
2001	The Rose	Downtown Pijao
2002	El Grizz	Downtown Pijao
2005	Ñacas	Downtown Pijao
2007	Salad Buey	Treasure Bottle
2010	Escape Room	Barbes
2012	¿Remember Me From The Party?	Downtown Pijao
2018	Daisy’s Beauty Salon	Downtown Pijao
EPs
2000	Cheap Chillin	
