= Eastern Parkway =

Boulevard in Brooklyn, New York

- Eastern Parkway Extension (east of Ralph Avenue)
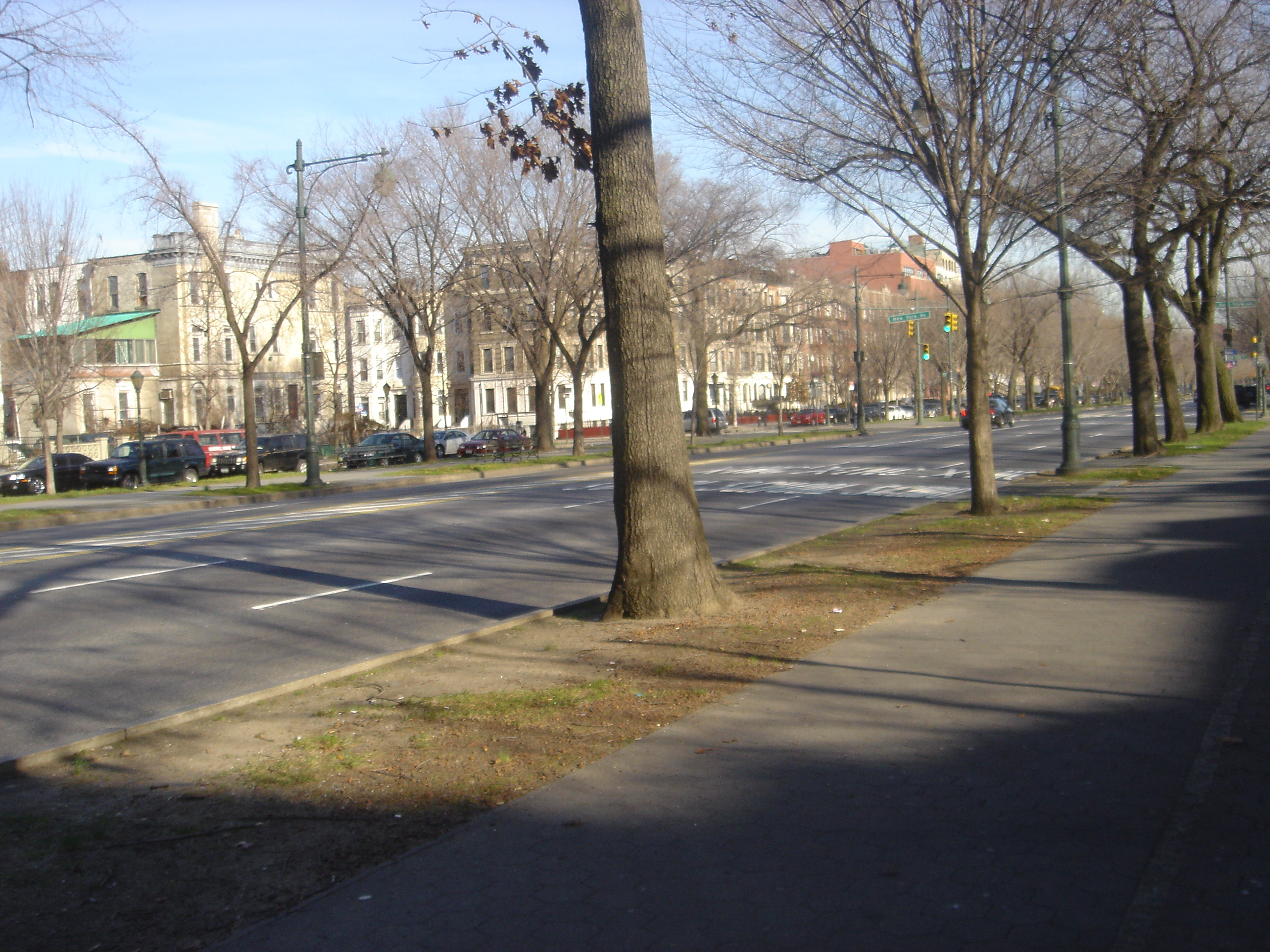
- Near New York Avenue in Crown Heights
- Former name: Sackett Street
- Maintained by: NYCDOT
- Length: 3.8 mi (6.1 km)
- Width: 70 to 200 feet (21 to 61 m)
- Restrictions: No commercial vehicles west of Ralph Avenue (excluding service roads)
- Location: Brooklyn, New York, United States
- West end: Grand Army Plaza in Prospect Heights
- East end: Bushwick Avenue in Bushwick
- Eastern Parkway
- U.S. National Register of Historic Places
- New York State Register of Historic Places
- New York City Landmark
- Built: 1870–1874 (original parkway); 1896–1898 (extension)
- Architects: Frederick Law Olmsted; Calvert Vaux
- NRHP reference No.: 83001689
- NYCL No.: 0998

Significant dates
- Added to NRHP: September 26, 1983
- Designated NYSRHP: March 29, 1981
- Designated NYCL: August 22, 1978

Eastern Parkway is a major east–west boulevard in the New York City borough of Brooklyn. Designed by Frederick Law Olmsted and Calvert Vaux, it was built between 1870 and 1874 and has been credited as the world's first parkway. At the time of its construction, Eastern Parkway extended to the eastern edge of the then-independent city of Brooklyn.

The road begins at Grand Army Plaza (the main entrance to Prospect Park) and runs 3.8 miles (6.1 km) east to Bushwick Avenue. The initial portion of Eastern Parkway, west of Ralph Avenue, consists of a main road and two service roads separated by landscaped medians, which include bike paths and walkways. The section west of Ralph Avenue is a New York City scenic landmark and on the National Register of Historic Places. The part east of Ralph Avenue is narrower and is officially known as the Eastern Parkway Extension.

Olmsted and Vaux designed Eastern Parkway, along with Ocean Parkway, in the 1860s to connect Prospect Park with neighborhoods further afield. Eastern Parkway was built with the expectation that it would be the centerpiece of a neighborhood with "first-class" housing. Ultimately, the resulting development encompassed a variety of building styles including single-family homes, mansions, and apartment buildings. Eastern Parkway has been modified several times over the years. The extension east of Ralph Avenue was built in the late 1890s, and the original parkway's service roads were widened in the 1900s. The neighborhoods around the parkway developed into Doctor's Row in the late 19th century, and further development occurred with the opening of the New York City Subway’s IRT Eastern Parkway Line in 1920. Following a period of deterioration, the section between Washington and Ralph avenues was rebuilt between 1987 and 1993, and the section west of Washington Avenue was rebuilt in the 2000s. By the 21st century, Eastern Parkway had some of Brooklyn's most dangerous intersections.

== Route description ==
Eastern Parkway is an arterial road extending 3.8 miles (6.1 km) across Brooklyn from west to east. Its western terminus is at Grand Army Plaza (originally Prospect Park Plaza), the main entrance to Prospect Park, where it intersects with Prospect Park West, Flatbush Avenue, and Vanderbilt Avenue. From Grand Army Plaza to Washington Avenue, the parkway consists of a broad, bidirectional avenue of six lanes, separated by a median from a narrow parallel service road on the north side. It passes Brooklyn Central Library, Brooklyn Museum, Mount Prospect Park, and Brooklyn Botanic Garden in this area; all of these are located on the south side of Eastern Parkway. The section between Washington and Ralph avenues has a second service road on the south side, separated by another median. The parkway makes a slight bend at Bedford Avenue, and it continues east to Ralph Avenue.

East of Ralph Avenue, the road is reduced to six lanes, heading in a northeasterly direction toward Bushwick Avenue. Here, Eastern Parkway officially becomes the Eastern Parkway Extension and curves to intersect with Howard Avenue, Atlantic Avenue, Fulton Street, and Broadway. In this area, Eastern Parkway runs diagonally to the rest of the street grid, creating several oblique intersections. At Bushwick Avenue, the extension becomes Vanderveer Street, a dead-end street. The extension connects to the Jackie Robinson Parkway, three blocks southeast, via Bushwick Avenue.

East of Ralph Avenue, the address numbers on Eastern Parkway continue down Pitkin Avenue toward Aqueduct Racetrack. Pitkin Avenue was created by the late 1890s when the Eastern Parkway Extension was constructed. Eastern Park, the home of the Brooklyn Dodgers before Ebbets Field, was located at Eastern Parkway and Vesta Avenue (now Pitkin Avenue at Van Sinderen Avenue, respectively).

In Crown Heights, Eastern Parkway divides the black community to the north and the Jewish community to the south. There have historically been tensions between the two demographic groups, especially after the 1991 Crown Heights riot, which occurred after one of the cars in Chabad-Lubavitch Rebbe Menachem Mendel Schneerson's motorcade struck two Guyanese children. Eastern Parkway also divides the two community boards that serve Crown Heights: Brooklyn Community Board 8 to the north and Brooklyn Community Board 9 to the south. One news reporter wrote in the 1990s that, although Eastern Parkway's apartment buildings and rowhouses were typical of a mid-20th-century American middle-class neighborhood, its West Indian and Jewish populations "created a world that sometimes resembles two vastly different countries".

=== Design ===
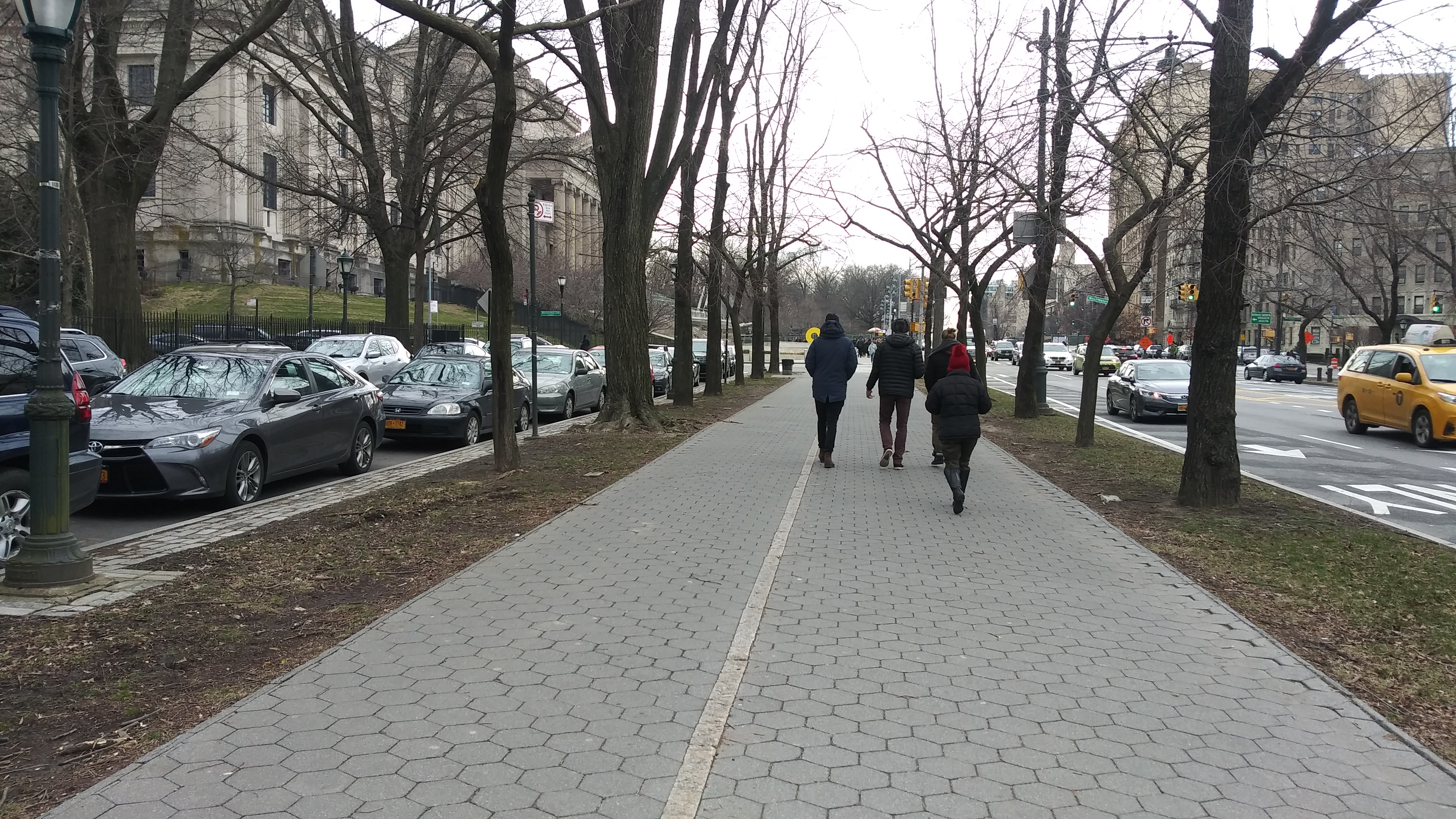
A walkway in one of the medians

The New York City Landmarks Preservation Commission and New York City Department of Parks and Recreation credit Eastern Parkway as the world's first parkway, built explicitly for personal and recreational traffic while restricting commercial traffic. Frederick Law Olmsted, the parkway's co-designer, described a parkway as "a shaded green ribbon" which might "be absolutely formal or strikingly picturesque, according to circumstances."

Eastern and Ocean parkways were planned together, though Eastern Parkway was intended to be the more grand of the two. The parkway is similar to Ocean Parkway in its layout. West of Washington Avenue, the roadway is about 150 feet (46 m) wide. The section between Washington and Ralph Avenues is 210 feet (64 m) wide between outer sidewalks, (Note: Several contemporary sources give a width of 210 feet (64 m), while the New York City Department of Parks and Recreation and New York City Landmarks Preservation Commission cite a different width of 200 feet (61 m).) with a main road, two service roads, and two medians. The main roads are around 55–60 feet (17–18 m) wide, while the service roads and medians are each around 30 feet (9.1 m) wide. Both medians are about 35 feet (11 m) wide and have trees, concrete and wood benches, and paths for pedestrians. The medians' walkways were originally paved in gravel, but these have since been replaced with hexagonal asphalt tiles. Residents along the parkway tend to use the medians as gathering spaces.

The Eastern Parkway Extension is 70 feet (21 m) wide between curbs, with two 20-foot-wide (6.1 m) sidewalks, for a total width of 110 feet (34 m). This section has a narrower median of between 5 and 8 feet (1.5 and 2.4 m) separating each direction of traffic. There are three lanes in each direction.

Originally, there were 1,100 trees planted in the medians. As such, Olmsted placed elm trees along the main road and a variety of trees consisting mostly of maples on the service roads. These were provided by John Condor's Brooklyn nursery. The southern median has a bike path, which part of the Brooklyn-Queens Greenway. The greenway runs south from the western end through Prospect Park to Ocean Parkway and east from the eastern end through Forest Park. The southern median's bike and pedestrian paths are separated by a rumble strip. The northern median is for pedestrians only. Many trees along the parkway bear plaques commemorating soldiers fallen in World War I. As of 2023, there are about 25 different species of trees. The block of Eastern Parkway between Bedford and Franklin avenues won the Brooklyn Botanic Garden's "Greenest Block in Brooklyn" contest in 2025, in part because of the efforts of the Crown Heights Keepers, a community group that maintains planters on Eastern Parkway.

=== Traffic and safety ===
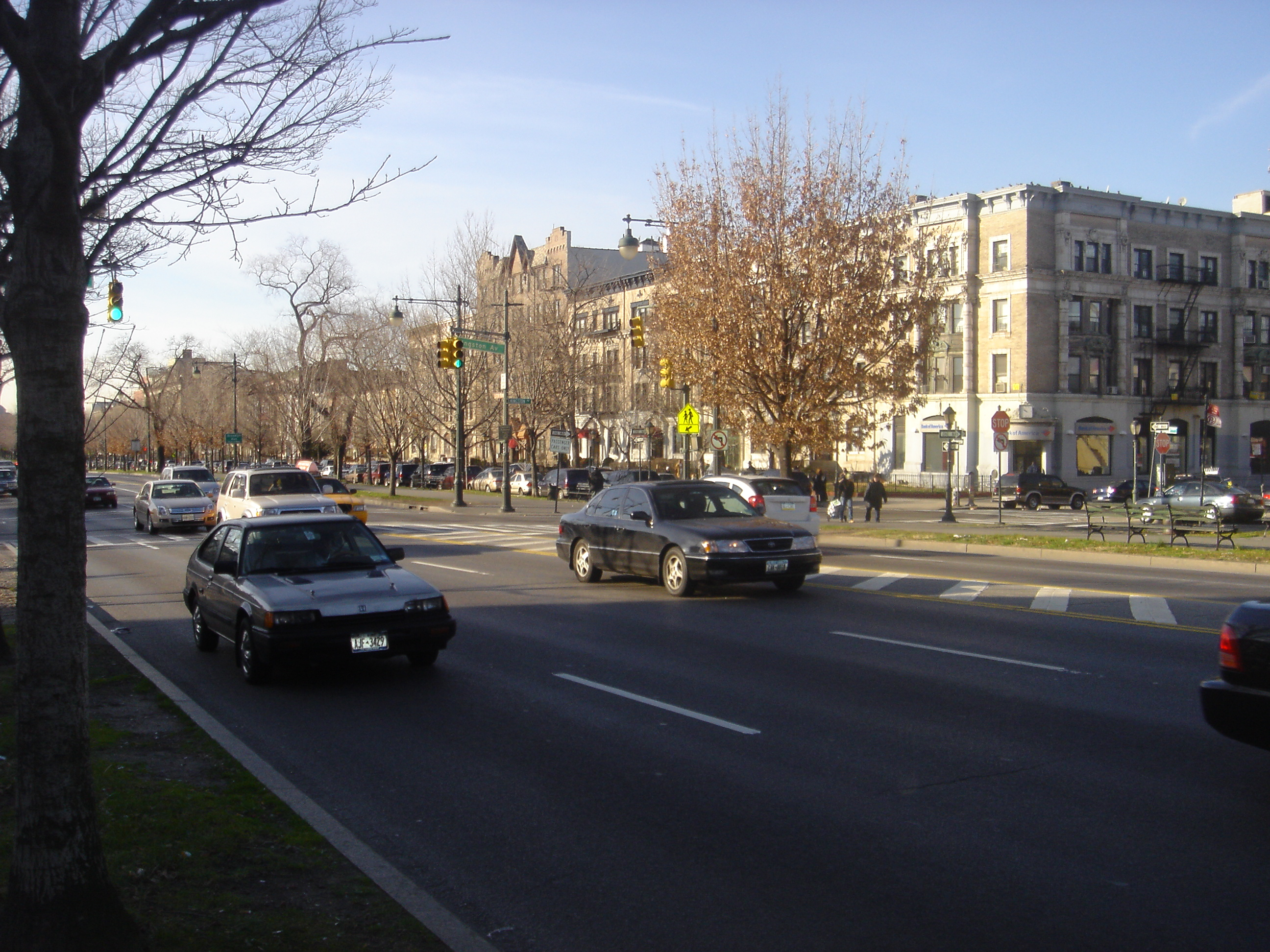
Traffic on Eastern Parkway at Kingston Avenue, seen in 2006

West of Ralph Avenue, most traffic uses the main road of Eastern Parkway, while the service roads tend to be used by local traffic. Commercial vehicles are prohibited on all three roadways west of Ralph Avenue, since that section of Eastern Parkway is classified as part of the New York City parks system. Trucks are allowed east of Ralph Avenue, where traffic loads are heavy throughout the day. Neither section of Eastern Parkway is designated as a local truck route. By the late 1990s, the parkway was used by 44,440 vehicles a day, traveling at an average speed of 27 miles per hour (43 km/h). As of 2023, segments of the original parkway are used by up to 45,000 vehicles a day, while segments of the extension average up to 35,000 a day.

Between Grand Army Plaza and Ralph Avenue, the main road has traffic lights at every intersection. At several intersections, only one of the two service roads have traffic lights, while the other service road has a stop sign. At intersections with two-way streets, both service roads and the main roads generally contain a traffic light. Since the parkway was not designed for modern traffic loads, traffic lights and crosswalks at the service roads are installed in a piecemeal fashion, creating inconsistencies even between adjacent intersections. At many intersections, there are also no crosswalks between the medians or on the service roads. Furthermore, drivers frequently exceed the speed limit of 25 miles per hour (40 km/h) due to the design of the main road, which is long, wide, and straight. Due to the parkway's width and the lack of traffic lights on some service roads, several intersections on Eastern Parkway record high rates of accidents. This is exacerbated by cars attempting to turn from the main road onto the side streets, which frequently block the crosswalk or make quick turns onto these streets. The medians are also crowded during rush hours, since several New York City Subway stations have entrances in the medians.

The intersection with Utica Avenue, a two-way street, was regarded in the 2010s as the most dangerous intersection in Brooklyn. This was once the second-most-dangerous intersection in the city, with 88 pedestrians being hurt and four being killed between 1995 and 2001. Another intersection with Washington Avenue, a two-way street, formerly lacked a traffic light for the northbound service road. Between 1995 and 2005, the intersection of Eastern Parkway and Washington Avenue saw one fatality and 39 injuries, though the intersection with Washington Avenue was later upgraded with a traffic light. The New York City Police Department also identified other intersections, such as Eastern Parkway's junctions with Kingston Avenue and Nostrand Avenue, as dangerous during the late 20th century. Four people were killed at the intersection with Nostrand Avenue between 1988 and 1993 alone.

Because of the high number of traffic incidents on Eastern Parkway, the parkway is designated as a Vision Zero traffic safety "priority corridor". In an effort to reduce injuries, the city proposed installing traffic signals on all of the service roads during the 2010s. In addition, dedicated turn lanes were added, and traffic signal phases were modified so cars did not conflict with pedestrians and cyclists.

== History ==
=== Development ===
==== Planning and construction ====
Eastern Parkway is located on the high edge of Harbor Hill Moraine, a terminal moraine. Approximately 17,000 years ago, the moraine of the receding Wisconsin Glacier, which formed Long Island, established a string of hills. Mount Prospect (or Prospect Hill), near the present-day intersection of Flatbush Avenue and Eastern Parkway, is one of the tallest hills in Brooklyn, rising 200 feet (61 m) above sea level. During the American Revolutionary War (1775–1783), the area was a site of the Battle of Long Island (also known as the Battle of Brooklyn). American forces attempted to hold Battle Pass, an opening in the terminal moraine where the old Flatbush Road passed from the villages of Brooklyn to Flatbush. It fell after some of the heaviest fighting in the engagement, and its loss contributed to George Washington's decision to retreat. Even though the Continental Army lost the battle, they were able to hold the British back long enough for Washington's army to escape across the East River to Manhattan.

Frederick Law Olmsted and Calvert Vaux, who were also responsible for Central Park and Prospect Park, suggested the construction of Eastern Parkway and Ocean Parkway to Brooklyn park commissioners in reports prepared in 1866. The proposed parkways would connect Prospect Park with Coney Island and East New York, and the parkways were inspired by boulevards such as Unter den Linden in Berlin and Avenue Foch in Paris. Ocean and Eastern parkways were considered to be improvements over the European thoroughfares, since both would contain service roads separated from the main road by tree-lined medians. Olmsted and Vaux intended the parkways to be the center of a parkway system in Brooklyn. Though this plan did not come to fruition, it spurred plans for other park and parkway systems in the United States. The design of Eastern Parkway also popularized the concept of tree-lined parkways in the U.S.

Until the 1860s, the road was known as Sackett Street, which had been platted out on city maps but not built. On May 6, 1868, the New York State Legislature approved the widening of the right-of-way between Washington and Ralph avenues, the latter street being the boundary of the City of Brooklyn at the time. In conjunction with the widening, Sackett Street was renamed Eastern Parkway, and zoning restrictions were placed on either side of the parkway. The decision to widen Sackett Street was a compromise, as Olmsted and Vaux had preferred a curving parkway. The grading of the site began in August 1870, and because the road was to run at the top of the high ridge of a moraine, this work was difficult. The grading resulted in the excavation of topsoil that was then used to landscape the medians. Gangs of workmen started to break up stone for gravel, paving stones, and Belgian blocks. By August 10, 1871, grading between Washington and Ralph avenues had been completed and paving had begun. Brooklyn's park commissioners expected that, considering Prospect Park was nearly complete, the parkway would be finished along with the park.

The Report of the Brooklyn Park Commissioners for the Years 1874–1879, contained a description of "Parkways, Avenues, Streets and Roads, graded, paved and otherwise improved by the Brooklyn Park Commissioners" between 1866 and 1879. The report classified Ocean Parkway as a "gravel roadway" and Eastern Parkway as being of "macadam stone, Belgian block and cobble". Specifically, the main road was paved with macadam or gravel to accommodate horse-drawn carriages, while the service roads were paved with stone blocks because they were used by heavier vehicles. At the time of its completion, Eastern Parkway overlooked the then-separate city of New York to the north, as well as Coney Island and the Rockaways to the south.

==== Lagging development of surrounding area ====
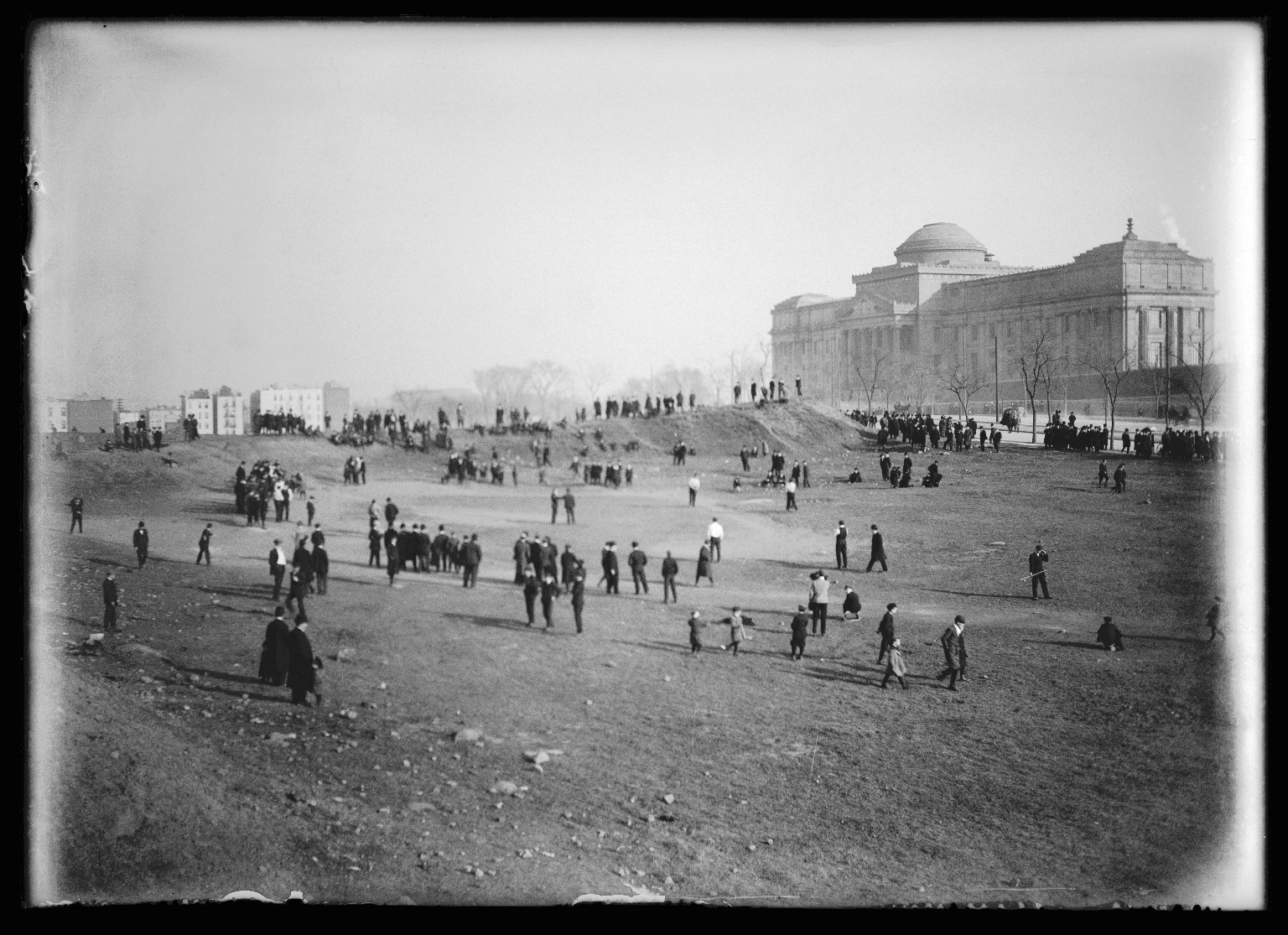
View of Eastern Parkway looking toward the Brooklyn Museum, cellulose nitrate negative photograph by Eugene Wemlinger c. 1903–1910

By 1874, Eastern Parkway was almost completed, and land lots were put for sale along the route of the parkway. The Brooklyn government also implemented a special zoning ordinance along the route (see § Structures). The plan was supposed to spur "first-class" construction on the parkway; according to Brooklyn city official James S. T. Stranahan, similar development had occurred in Brooklyn Heights and at the original location of Columbia College. Development was stymied by disputes over the ownership of Prospect Park's East Side lands at the parkway's western end. The city of Brooklyn sold off some of the property north of the parkway in 1881. The city's attempts to sell the remaining lots led to a lengthy lawsuit in which the New York Court of Appeals ruled in favor of the city. Some of the land lay undeveloped until a realty company vouched for the property title in 1910. While Stranahan originally envisioned one large park between Prospect Park and Jamaica, Queens, rapid development made this impossible.

Development was also hindered by the presence of the Kings County Penitentiary near Nostrand Avenue, as well as stables, pig farms, and dumps along the parkway. Few wealthy people wanted to live on Eastern Parkway as a result, and the area was filled with empty lots and billboards. The Brooklyn city government had placed a tax assessment on nearby properties to fund the parkway's construction, but many smaller landowners instead abandoned their land. By the 1880s, the city had expanded eastward to the neighborhood of New Lots, but the area around Eastern Parkway was still underdeveloped. The first major development on Eastern Parkway, at the northwest corner with Utica Avenue, did not commence until 1887; the Eastern Parkway Improvement Association was established at that time. The next year, Brooklyn park commissioners reported that 279 of the 1,014 land lots north of the parkway had been sold, though none of the land to the south had been sold yet.

To the east, the parkway connected with Weeksville and Carrville, two communities with a high population of black people. News media in the 1890s described Eastern Parkway as leading "nowhere". The parkway was seldom used east of Bedford Avenue, and the eastern end of the parkway transitioned abruptly into an unpaved road. The Brooklyn Daily Eagle described the Ralph Avenue terminus in 1896 as being situated "on the brow of a forbidding hill", and the New-York Tribune wrote in 1894 that the parkway had "not more than half a dozen recently built houses". In addition, the parkway was in poor condition, with layers of mud covering the roadways.

=== 1880s and 1890s ===
==== Upgrades ====
In 1883, workers installed naphtha lamps along Eastern Parkway. Brooklyn city officials announced plans the next year to repave Eastern Parkway with gravel between Prospect Park Plaza and Brooklyn Avenue. The repaving took place during 1885. In addition, cyclists were allowed to begin using the main roadway at all times, provided that they followed traffic laws. During the 1890s, the Brooklyn park commissioners proposed widening the service roads by 10 feet (3.0 m) to accommodate heavy vehicles, as well as repaving the entire roadway. The Brooklyn Daily Eagle predicted that carriage drivers would support the paving project after Highland Park was completed.

Two city aldermen requested funding in early 1895 to construct a bike path as far east as Howard Avenue. A bike path was added alongside the existing roadway, and some lampposts were removed to make way for the bike path. Soon after the bike path opened in late 1895, the Good Roads Association said that cyclists seldom used the path because they had to navigate steep curbs at each intersection. The city of Brooklyn also upgraded other parts of the existing parkway. The intersection with Bedford Avenue was repaved in brick, and the curbs at that intersection were lowered to allow cyclists to safely cross the street. Workers laid a sidewalk on the south side of the parkway west of Washington Avenue, along the northern edge of Prospect Park's East Side lands. In addition, the Brooklyn city government had repaved the main roadway in macadam by 1896.

==== Extensions ====
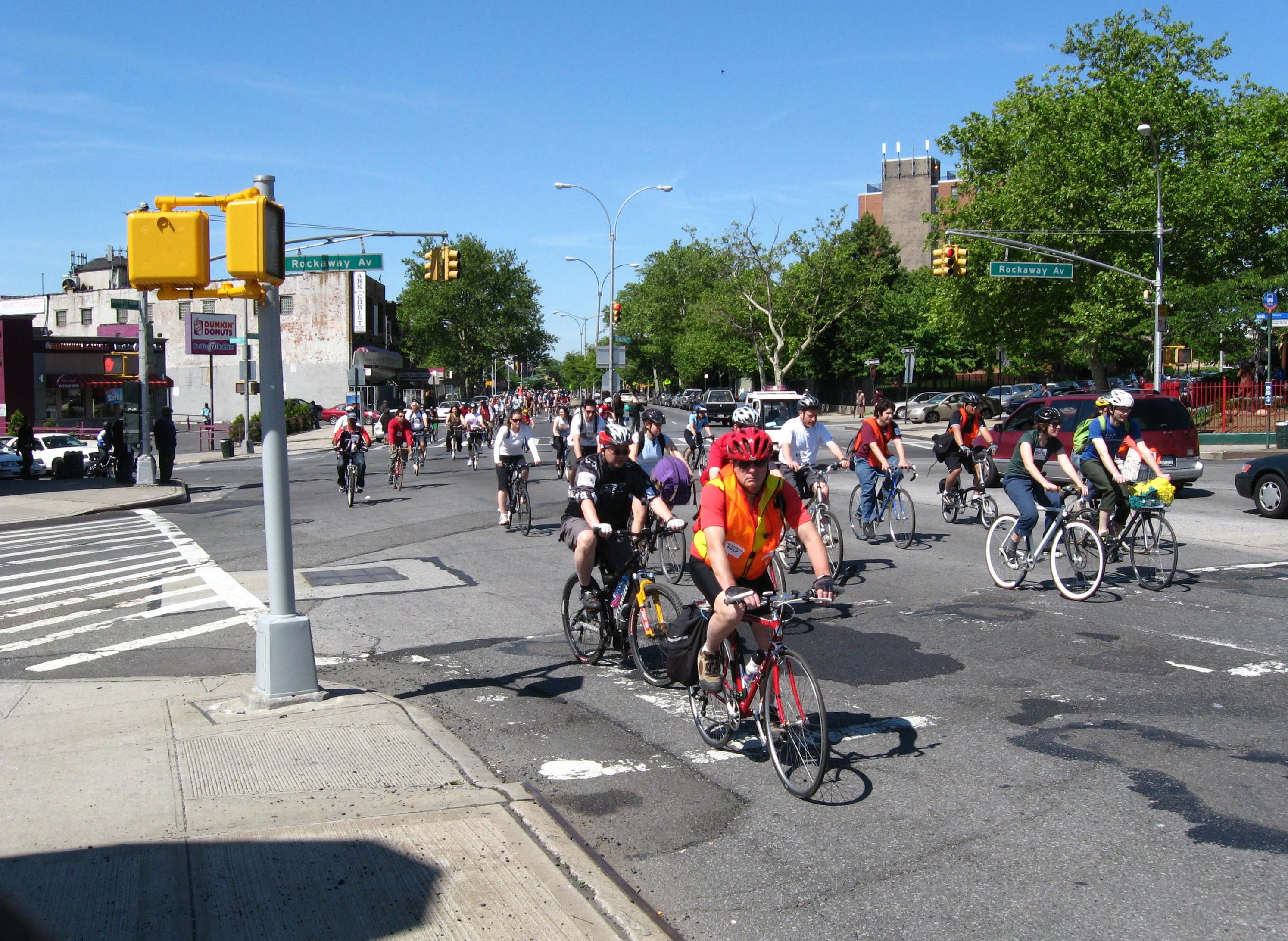
Bicyclists on the Eastern Parkway Extension near Rockaway Avenue in 2008

In the early 1890s, Brooklyn officials proposed extending the parkway northeast to near Cemetery of the Evergreens, Highland Park, and the Ridgewood Reservoir along Brooklyn and Queens' Cemetery Belt. The extension was to travel northeast to Stone Avenue (now Mother Gaston Boulevard), then north to Fulton Street and northeast to Bushwick Avenue. Another road, Highland Boulevard, would continue eastward from Bushwick Avenue to Highland Park. State lawmakers introduced legislation to extend the parkway in March 1891; the Assembly passed the bill at the end of that month, and the Senate approved it that April. Consulting engineer John Y. Culyer began preparing plans for the extension the next year. Brooklyn's park commissioners appropriated $600,000 for the project, and they planned to obtain 368 land lots through eminent domain. Work on the extension stalled for several years because Brooklyn park commissioner George V. Brower opposed it.

In 1896, Governor Levi P. Morton signed legislation authorizing the parkway's extension and approved further land acquisition for that purpose. The Brooklyn government acquired 466 parcels of land from 150 landowners. Thomas Byrnes and M. J. Dady were hired to construct two parts of the extension in September 1896. Byrnes was hired to construct the section from Ralph to Rockaway avenues, while Dady was to build Highland Boulevard, connecting Eastern Parkway's Bushwick Avenue terminus with Highland Park. Dady was hired to construct the section between Rockaway and Bushwick avenues that November. Brooklyn park commissioner Timothy L. Woodruff planned to include bike paths along the Eastern Parkway Extension as well, and he was devising plans for the paths by June 1896. The extension to Bushwick Avenue, along with Highland Boulevard, had been completed by 1897. From Ralph to Bushwick avenues, the median was originally paved in macadam, while the outer lanes were paved in asphalt. The section along Highland Boulevard was paved in brick. The bike path between Ralph and Stone avenues was complete by 1898, and cyclists were using the entire extension by the following year.

Brooklyn's Department of City Works also wanted to build a 500-foot (150 m) long connection from the parkway's original terminus, at Ralph Avenue, to East New York Avenue. The Cody Brothers was hired to construct the connecting street, which measured 80 feet (24 m) wide, After the consolidation of the City of Greater New York, there were proposals to extend Eastern Parkway further through Cypress Hills Cemetery and Ridgewood Reservoir, connecting to Forest Park in Queens. The proposed extension to Forest Park ultimately became the Interboro (now Jackie Robinson) Parkway. There were also unsuccessful proposals to extend Eastern Parkway southeast to Rockaway Parkway, east to the Queens county border, and east to the Long Island suburbs.

=== 1900s and 1910s ===
By the early 1900s, the area around Eastern Parkway was being developed, and the majority of structures did not follow Olmsted's original zoning regulations. Apartment buildings and two-family residences were built along the parkway. Workers renovated Eastern Parkway during 1900, and New York City park commissioners decreed the same year that heavy wagons use the service roads instead of the main roadway. There were also proposals for a 48-inch-wide (120 cm) water main under Eastern Parkway, transporting water from Ridgewood Reservoir to Mount Prospect Park, and the New York City government hired John J. Cashman in July 1903 to construct the water main. The water main's installation was temporarily delayed when the New York City Department of Parks and Recreation (NYC Parks) refused to allow Cashman to excavate the parkway.

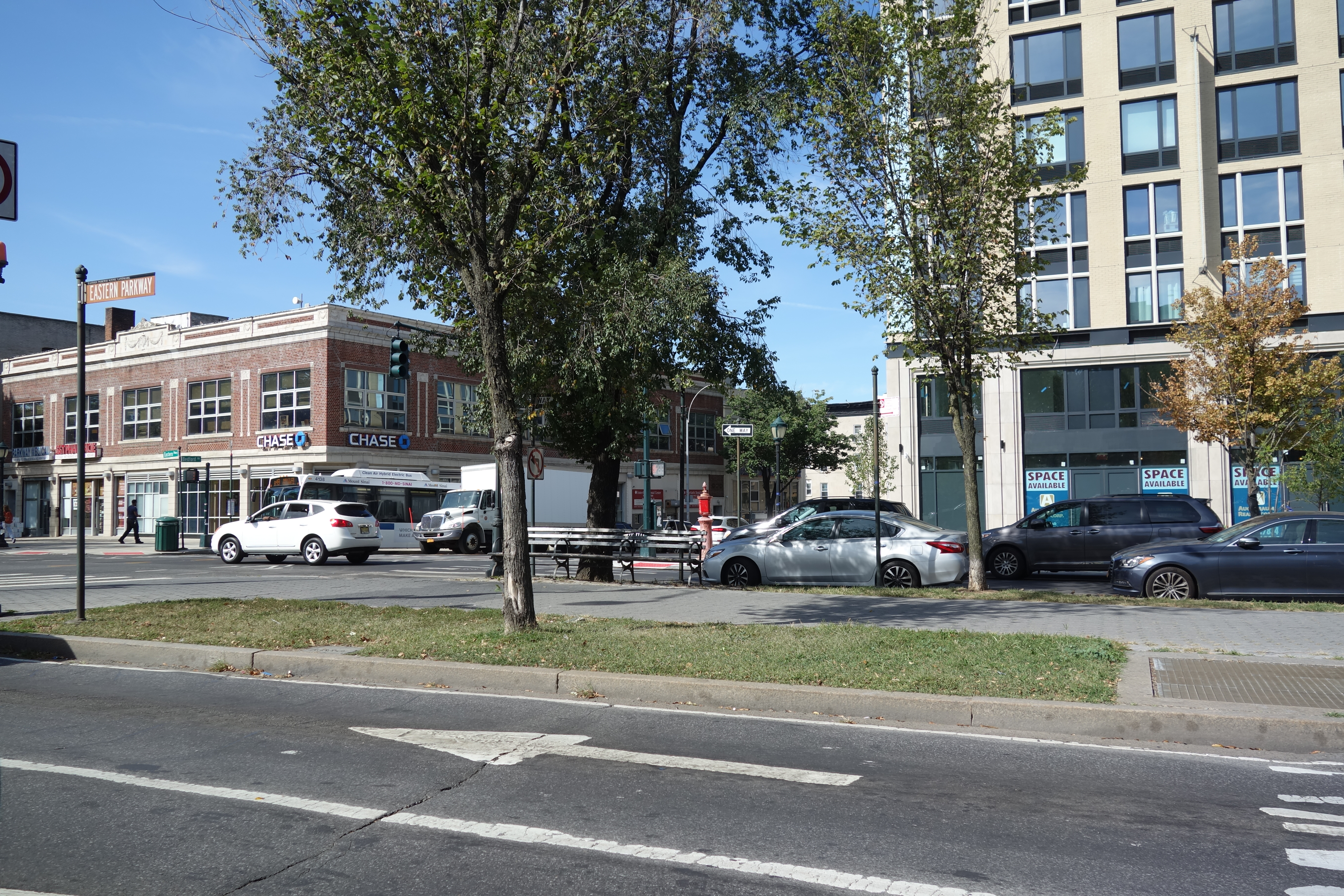
The northern median of Eastern Parkway at Bedford Avenue. An equestrian statue of Henry Warner Slocum was installed at this intersection in 1905.

An equestrian statue of Henry Warner Slocum was installed in the middle of the main roadway, at the intersection with Bedford Avenue, in 1905. The Bedford Avenue intersection was also widened, since the statue would have otherwise posed a navigational hazard. The service roads were regraded and widened in the late 1900s, and dead trees along the parkway were replaced in the same decade. The main road was also paved in macadam, and the service roads were paved in asphalt, allowing automobiles to more easily traverse Eastern Parkway. The western stretch of the parkway became known as "Doctor's Row" due to the high concentration of professionals that moved to the area by the 20th century. Eastern Parkway divided the Crow Hill section of Crown Heights to the south and the African American village of Weeksville to the north.

The early 20th century brought proposals for New York City Subway lines to Brooklyn, and builders anticipated that development would increase along corridors with subway lines. There were proposals for a subway line on Eastern Parkway as early as the 1900s, after the completion of the city's first subway line. As part of the Dual Contracts, in 1914 the Interborough Rapid Transit Company (IRT) agreed to extend its Brooklyn Line under Flatbush Avenue and Eastern Parkway. The line would have had up to three branches, namely the Nostrand Avenue, Utica Avenue, and New Lots Avenue lines, though the Utica Avenue Line was never built.

Due to concerns that the subway would damage 500 to 800 old elm trees on Eastern Parkway, Brooklyn park commissioner Raymond Ingersoll recommended that the plans be modified to avoid damaging the trees. As a result, plans for the line were changed in October 1914. The four-track tunnel under Eastern Parkway was built as a double-decked structure, except at the Franklin Avenue station, where all tracks were on the same level. The tunnel between Grand Army Plaza and Nostrand Avenue was built using the cut-and-cover method, with two steam shovels excavating an estimated 600,000 cubic yards (460,000 m^{3}). Dirt from the excavation of the tunnel was used to infill the old Brighton Beach Race Course. The center roadway was torn up in 1915 to allow workers to dig the subway tunnels, and traffic was diverted to the service roads. During the subway's construction, the Brooklyn Times Union wrote in 1916 that the parkway was often crowded during the evenings and on Sundays.

=== 1920s to 1940s ===
The Eastern Parkway Line opened in 1920. The city government was supposed to restore Eastern Parkway's main roadway after the subway was completed. The project was delayed through 1921 due to disputes over who would pay for the work. In addition, numerous residential buildings were developed along the parkway, especially near stations served by express trains. After the subway opened, large numbers of Jews and African-Americans moved into high-rise buildings along Eastern Parkway, such as Copley Plaza and Turner Towers. Brick houses and religious buildings were also built, including what would become the Lubavitch world headquarters at 770 Eastern Parkway. Rents for storefronts on the parkway increased by more than 100% after the subway opened, from $1,000–1,200 before World War I to $2,500–3,000 afterward. By the 1920s, the area around the parkway was an upscale residential neighborhood, where people would visit just to see wealthy residents drive by.

There were proposals in 1923 to move about 2,300 trees from Bedford Avenue to Eastern Parkway; these trees contained plaques with the names of Brooklyn residents who had died in World War I. The next year, NYC Parks officials proposed relocating only the plaques, affixing them to trees on Eastern Parkway. The Slocum statue at the intersection with Bedford Avenue, which posed a danger to the increasing automobile traffic on the parkway, was relocated to Prospect Park in 1924. A traffic light was erected in place of the Slocum statue at Bedford Avenue. Following requests from local politicians, the city government agreed to install additional traffic lights on the western section of the parkway in 1927. Another traffic signal was added at Bushwick Avenue the next year, along with a synchronized traffic-signal system from Grand Army Plaza all the way east to Ralph Avenue. Further signals were added on the Eastern Parkway Extension from Ralph Avenue to Fulton Street in 1929.

By the 1930s, the Eastern Parkway Extension's median had become hazardous; the median's plantings hindered visibility, and its stone pavement damaged drivers' cars. Concrete benches were installed along the parkway's bike path in the early 1930s, and cement crosswalks for cyclists were added to several intersections. In 1939, the fences around the parkway's trees were removed, and the memorial plaques on some of the fences were reinstalled on granite stones at the bases of each tree. To direct motorists to the 1939 New York World's Fair in Queens, the city government installed amber-colored street lamps on the parkway east of Howard Avenue. A Works Progress Administration guidebook from the same year stated that Eastern Parkway "recalls the Champs-Élysées". The parkway's condition gradually declined during the mid-20th century due to a lack of maintenance. NYC Parks added road surface markings to Eastern Parkway in 1946 after the parkway was repaved. The same year, the New York City Council contemplated renaming the thoroughfare to Memorial Parkway, though this did not happen.

=== 1950s to 1970s ===
Additional traffic markings were painted onto the roadway in 1950, and the city adjusted the parkway's traffic signals two years later. The existing traffic lights, in the middle of the roadway, were involved in one-third of the vehicular crashes on Eastern Parkway by the mid-1950s. Accordingly, the New York City Department of Transportation (NYCDOT) announced in 1958 that it would add yield signs and traffic lights to Eastern Parkway's service roads at several intersections. At the time, only the main road had traffic lights, and drivers on the service roads had to yield to traffic turning from the main road, even though the wide medians hindered visibility. The existing traffic lights at 17 intersections were replaced with signals suspended from mast arms, and pedestrian signals were added at seven intersections.

Several north–south cross-streets in Crown Heights were converted to one-way streets in 1963, and the traffic signals on Eastern Parkway were adjusted to facilitate traffic flow on these streets. In advance of the 1964 New York World's Fair, workers also planted new trees along Ocean Parkway. Traffic commissioner Henry Barnes also added parking spaces to the service roads, and he removed parking spaces near intersections to improve visibility. Two years later, the NYCDOT announced that it would install a computer-controlled traffic light system to synchronize the traffic signals on Eastern Parkway. The New York City Board of Estimate did not approve the computerized system until 1970, and the system was activated in 1973.

Brooklyn officials requested funding in 1973 to renovate the parkway from Ralph to Bushwick Avenue, and the Board of Estimate allocated $965,000 that March for a renovation of the parkway. The work was to include new trees, restoration of the medians, and repairs to the service roads. By then, the parkway saw relatively few visitors at night due to fears of crime. Prostitution on the parkway was commonplace, and several stabbings took place there as well. In 1976, Borough President Sebastian Leone asked the New York City Landmarks Preservation Commission (LPC) to designate Eastern Parkway a New York City scenic landmark, following a similar designation for Ocean Parkway. New York City Council president Carol Bellamy endorsed the landmark designation, and the parkway was declared a scenic landmark on August 22, 1978.

=== 1980s and 1990s ===
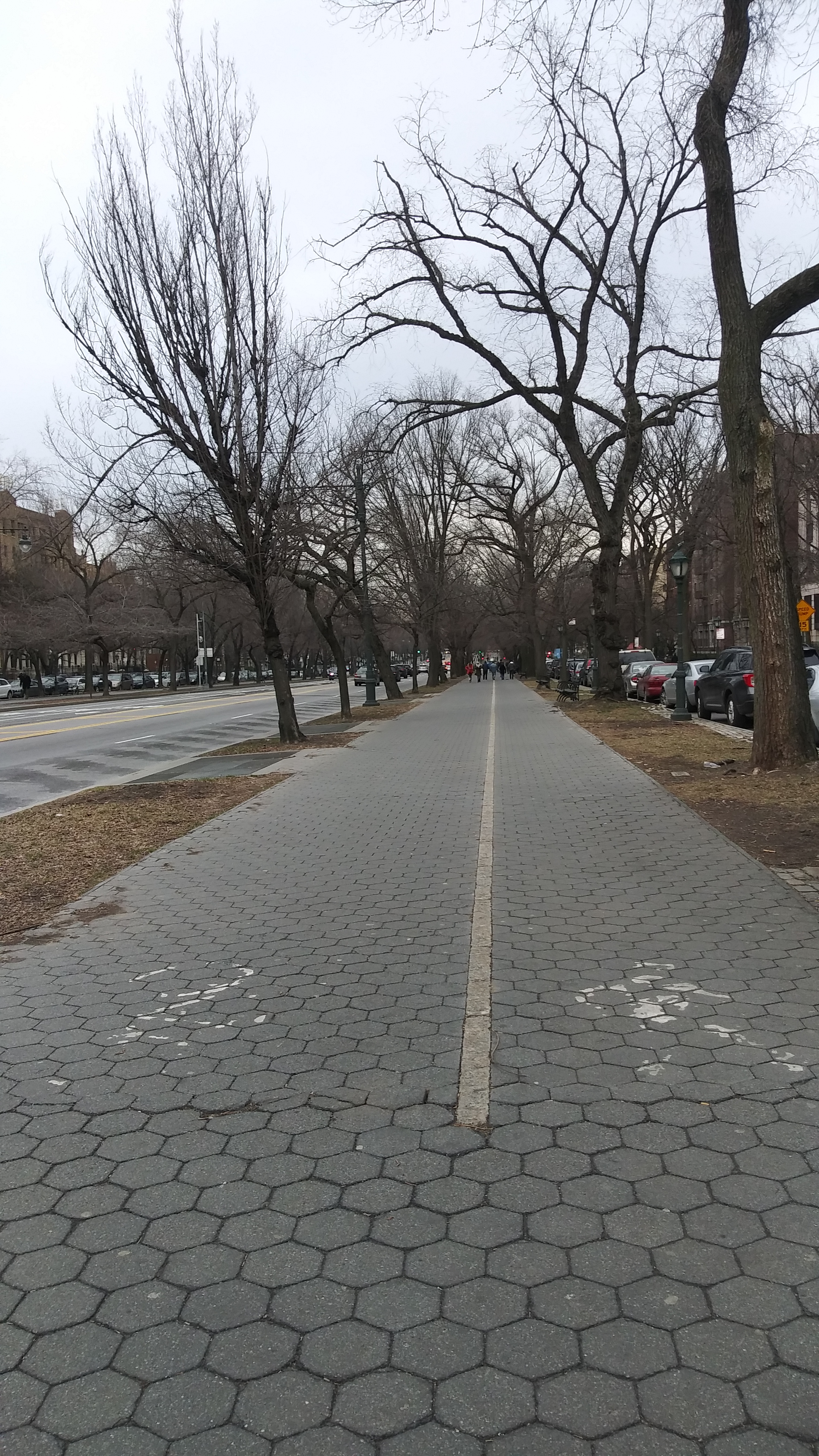
Bike path on Eastern Parkway, reconstructed during the 1980s

After the New York City fiscal crisis, the city government had comparatively little money on hand to repair Eastern Parkway in the 1970s and early 1980s. According to Leone, the city-landmark designation would allow the city government to more easily apply for state and federal funding to rebuild Eastern Parkway. There were also plans to integrate the parkway into the Brooklyn–Queens Greenway, a bike and walking path across Brooklyn and Queens. By the mid-1980s, many of the elm trees on the parkway had died because of Dutch elm disease, and there were holes in the pavement, broken benches, and missing pieces of curb. The parkway was listed on the National Register of Historic Places in 1983. That year, NYCDOT officials asked the LPC for a certificate of appropriateness, which would allow the NYCDOT to renovate the parkway. The plans called for rebuilt roadways and a new bikeway on the southern median, as well as new benches, lamps, traffic signals, and curbs. The state government announced plans in October 1983 to sell $56 million in bonds to fund the parkway's reconstruction.

The city announced in 1986 that it would spend $40 million to redesign Eastern Parkway, starting with the section between Washington and Pitkin avenues. The NYCDOT began requesting bids for the reconstruction of Eastern Parkway west of Pitkin Avenue that November. Work officially commenced on Eastern Parkway's renovation in August 1987. A $59 million, three-year contract was awarded to Naclerio Contracting Company. even though several of the company's previous projects had been delayed significantly. About $27.8 million of the funding came from the federal government, which had originally earmarked the funds for the unbuilt Westway project in Manhattan, while the city government paid the rest of the cost. The reconstruction of Eastern Parkway was initially slated to take three years. The project entailed installing water and sewage pipes, as well as rebuilding the roadways, sidewalks, and medians. One of the inner roadway's six travel lanes was removed. Granite curbs were installed; benches, street lights, and traffic signs were replaced; and a bike lane with hexagonal asphalt blocks was added. The medians were replanted, and 1,000 trees were added. Nearly 2,500 parking spaces were temporarily removed, so people frequently double-parked in travel lanes.

The West Indian Day Parade, which performed on Eastern Parkway every year, was not displaced by the project. Due to a dispute with the New York City government, Naclerio temporarily halted work on the reconstruction of Eastern Parkway from 1988 to September 1989. Naclerio stopped working on the project again after it filed for Chapter 11 bankruptcy protection in 1990. The city government refused to fire Naclerio, though it did file a lawsuit to force the renovation's completion. Further complications arose after city officials found that the mobster John A. Gotti was involved with the parkway's renovation. Work resumed in mid-1991 after more than a year of delays. A representative of Brooklyn Community Board 9 said that residents had "been victimized long enough" by the prolonged renovation, while the chairman of Brooklyn Community Board 8 said, "I went away to war and came back and nothing was changed." After the Tully Construction Company resumed construction in 1993, it revised its cost estimate upward to $62.4 million, although city officials claimed that the project could be finished for $55.1 million. The renovation was completed that year. Part of the parkway was again excavated in 1995 while workers repaired the subway tunnel underneath.

=== 2000s to present ===
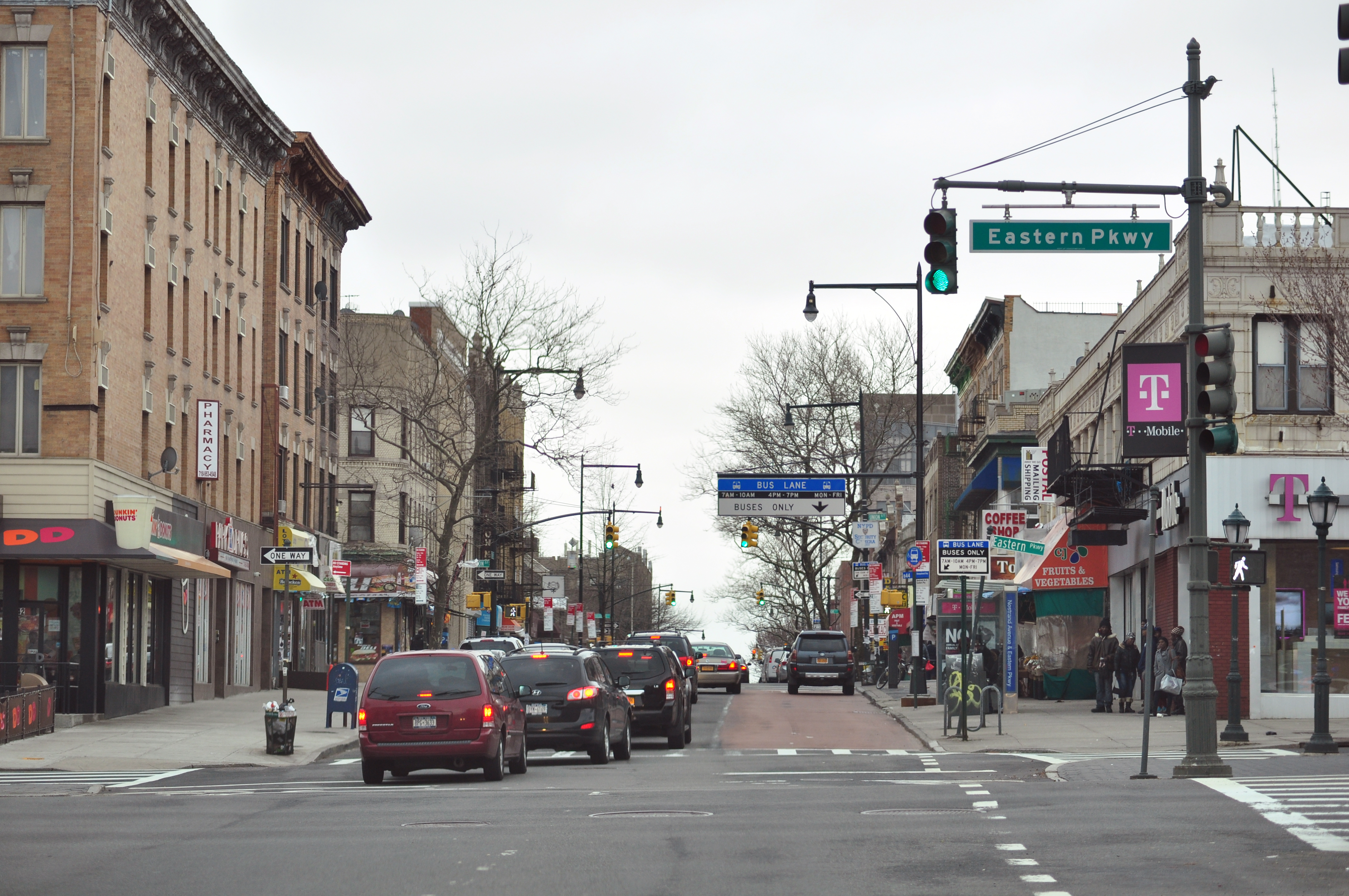
An oversized street sign at the intersection with Nostrand Avenue. Similar street signs were installed in 2003.

To improve wayfinding, the NYCDOT added oversized street signs to several intersections along Eastern Parkway in 2003. The agency also retimed traffic lights at several intersections, allowing pedestrians to start crossing the street before vehicles could proceed. The four-block section of Eastern Parkway between Grand Army Plaza and Washington Avenue was the only part of the original parkway that had not been rebuilt. Although the New York City government had spent $362,000 to redesign that section of the parkway, funding for construction was delayed after the city councilman for the area, James Davis, was assassinated in 2003. Work on a $5.9 million reconstruction of that section began in October 2005. The reconstruction was completed in the early 2010s. The work included a westbound bike lane in the northern median and a traffic light at the intersection with Washington Avenue.

As part of a pilot program, the NYCDOT also replaced the parkway's street lamps with LED lights in the early 2010s, a move that saved $70,000 annually. Following the success of the pilot program, the NYCDOT later installed LED lights across the city. The agency also added concrete pedestrian medians at two intersections in 2015 but removed them after local officials said the islands would obstruct the West Indian Day Parade; these medians were replaced with removable rubber medians. In 2017, as part of the Vision Zero traffic-safety plan, NYCDOT also proposed installing traffic signals on all of the service roads. The segment between Lincoln Place and Pacific Street was upgraded in 2020, providing additional space for cyclists and pedestrians. The intersection of Eastern Parkway and Buffalo Avenue was upgraded in 2022. The NYCDOT proposed further upgrades to the section between Rogers and Troy avenues in 2023, and it proposed accessibility upgrades to the section between Schenectady and Rogers avenues in 2025.

== Structures ==
=== Original zoning ===
The design of the original parkway was supposed to spur the construction of prestigious residential structures between Douglas Street to the north and President Street to the south. Olmsted believed he could narrow the paved portion of the main road to 40 feet (12 m) and widen the medians to 50 feet (15 m). The service roads themselves would be relegated to 35-foot-wide (11 m) driveways. On the service roads, Olmsted proposed erecting only "first class" residences, with buildings set back 30 feet (9.1 m) from the sidewalk. These buildings would have been detached homes with courtyards, and the Brooklyn park commissioners were charged with ensuring that all new development conformed to that building style.

Douglass and President streets, which run two blocks away from Eastern Parkway, were widened when the parkway was built. The streets directly to the south and north of the parkway (respectively, Union and Degraw streets) were narrowed to 35 feet (11 m). All new construction on Union and Degraw streets was banned except for private horse stables, which were to be attached to houses along Eastern Parkway. Because of these restrictions, and because the eastern end of the parkway led nowhere, these sites remained under-developed into the end of the 19th century. The housing restriction was repealed in 1903. Other restrictions were put in place, including a requirement that all proposed plantings be approved first.

=== Current structures ===
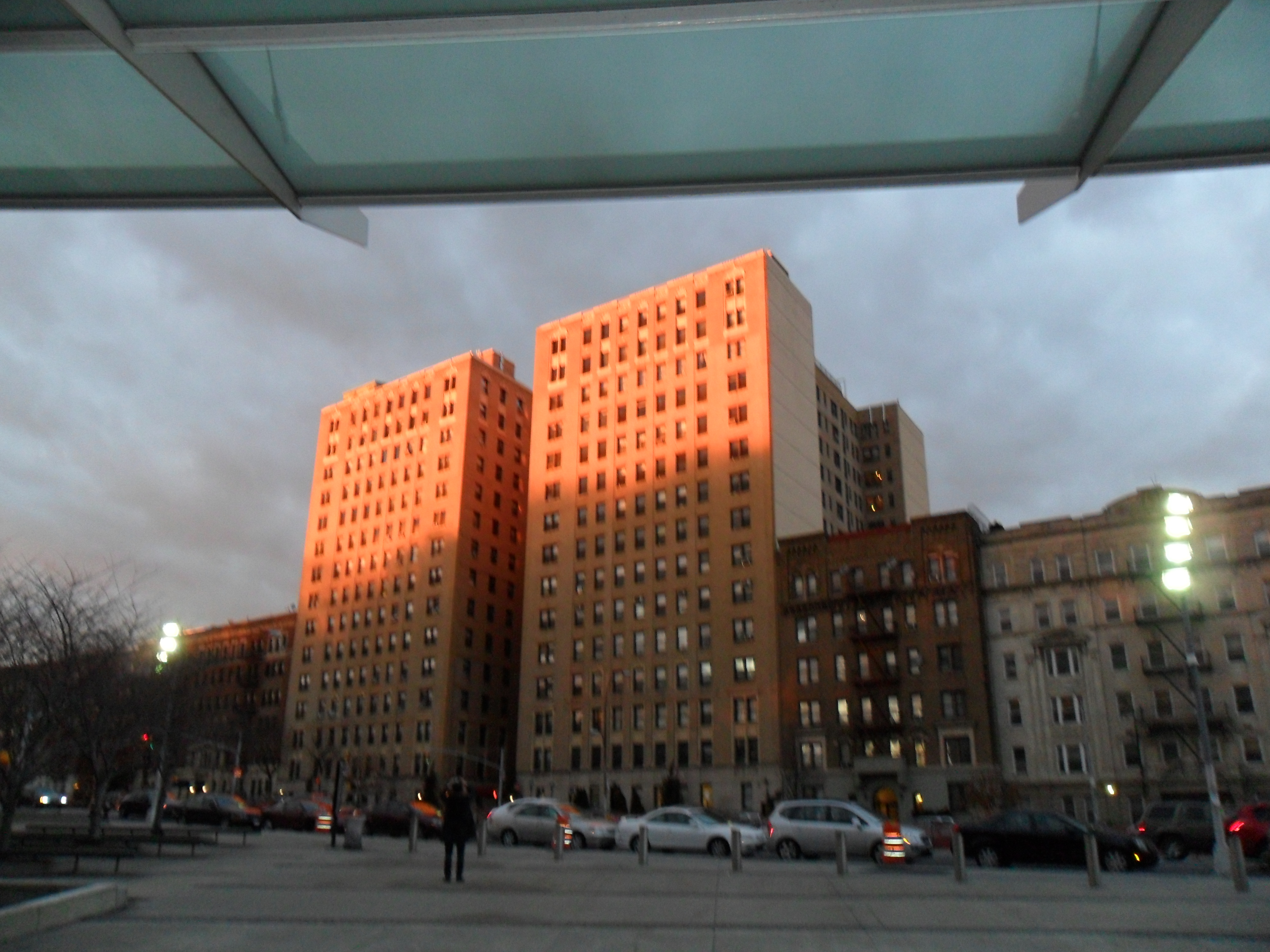
Apartment building on Eastern Parkway across from the Brooklyn Museum

In the 21st century, Eastern Parkway contains a variety of zoning uses. While the parkway is mostly zoned for mid-to-high-rise residential structures, there are also small areas of commercial zoning, as well as industrial zoning at the extreme eastern end, where there is a high concentration of transit-related infrastructure in the area around Broadway Junction. In addition, high-rise zoning is allowed at the western end. Eastern Parkway is lined with one-and-two-family rowhouses, apartment complexes, semi-detached residences, and freestanding mansions. There are many pre-war apartment buildings on the parkway, some of which have become housing cooperatives. Some of these apartment buildings, such as Turner Towers and Copley Plaza, are similar to developments on Park Avenue in Manhattan. Commercial uses are more common at Franklin, Nostrand, Kingston, Schenectady, and Utica Avenues, where there are subway entrances. Generally, the Eastern Parkway Extension has fewer institutions or commercial structures, and there are many more residential or industrial buildings. The city's zoning prevents office buildings from being built on the parkway.

Brooklyn Public Library branch at 1044 Eastern Parkway

Some of the larger structures on the parkway include the Brooklyn Museum and the Brooklyn Central Library. Other attractions and notable buildings along Eastern Parkway include the Brooklyn Botanic Garden, the Lubavitch world headquarters at 770 Eastern Parkway, and the Jewish Children's Museum. The East New York Savings Bank Building, a designated city landmark, is at 1117 Eastern Parkway on the northwest corner with Utica Avenue. There are also numerous parks along Eastern Parkway's route. In addition to Prospect and Highland parks, Eastern Parkway passes by Mount Prospect Park at its west end, as well as Callahan and Kelly Playground at its eastern end. There are also numerous schools and educational institutions around the parkway, such as PS 155, PS 157, PS 167, Prospect High School, Clara Barton High School, and Medgar Evers College.

== Events ==
Eastern Parkway is the route of the West Indian Day Parade, a festive annual celebration taking place during J'ouvert, around Labor Day. The parade, which has been held on Eastern Parkway since c. 1968, attracts between one and three million participants each year. The event often attracts West Indians from all over the Americas. Street vendors and other businesses on Eastern Parkway prepare large amounts of food for the parade. In the 21st century, the West Indian Day Parade has received media attention for shootings and stabbings on the route, both during and following the parade.

As of 2023, as part of New York City's annual Summer Streets event, the street is closed to traffic for pedestrians and cyclists for one Saturday in August. Eastern Parkway has also been used as the route of the Brooklyn Half Marathon. The parkway hosted large Memorial Day parades every year for much of the 20th century; by the 2000s, these parades had been moved to Bay Ridge, Brooklyn, due to declining attendance. In addition, thousands of rabbis congregate annually on Eastern Parkway to take group photos near the Lubavitch headquarters.

== Transportation ==
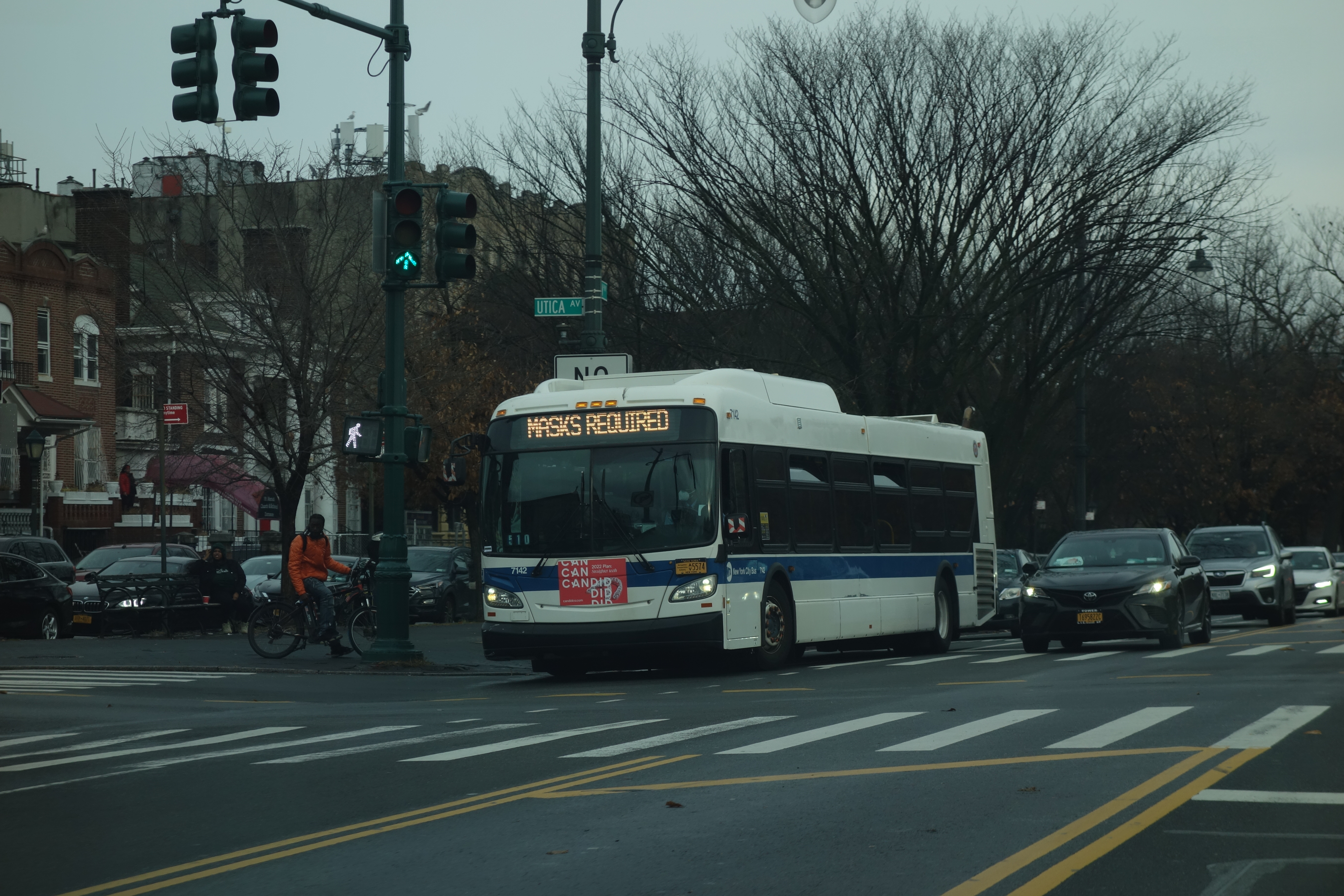
A bus at the intersection with Utica Avenue

The New York City Subway's IRT Eastern Parkway Line runs under the parkway. There are stations at Eastern Parkway–Brooklyn Museum (served by the 2 and 3 trains), Franklin Avenue (served by the 2, 3, 4, 5, and S trains), Nostrand Avenue and Kingston Avenue (both served by the 3 train), and Crown Heights–Utica Avenue (served by the 3 and 4 trains). The line underneath Eastern Parkway is mostly a double-deck tunnel, with two tracks on each level. At the Franklin Avenue station, all four tracks of the Eastern Parkway Line are on the same level, and the S (Franklin Avenue Shuttle) train crosses over the Eastern Parkway Line. The Broadway Junction station on the A, C, J, L, and Z trains is located at the extreme eastern end of the Eastern Parkway Extension.

Several bus routes also serve Eastern Parkway. The B14 bus runs on Eastern Parkway eastbound from Utica Avenue to Ralph Avenue, and the westbound B14 runs on the parkway from Howard Avenue to Schenectady Avenue, terminating at Utica Avenue. The Crown Heights–bound B17 bus runs from Troy Avenue to Utica Avenue, where it terminates. The Ridgewood–bound B20 and Bushwick–bound Q24 buses run on the parkway from Fulton Street to Broadway.

== See also ==
- List of parkways in New York
- List of New York City Designated Landmarks in Brooklyn
- List of New York City scenic landmarks
- National Register of Historic Places listings in Brooklyn
