= Mount Prospect Park =

Public park in Brooklyn, New York

Coordinates: 40.671552°N 73.966535°W

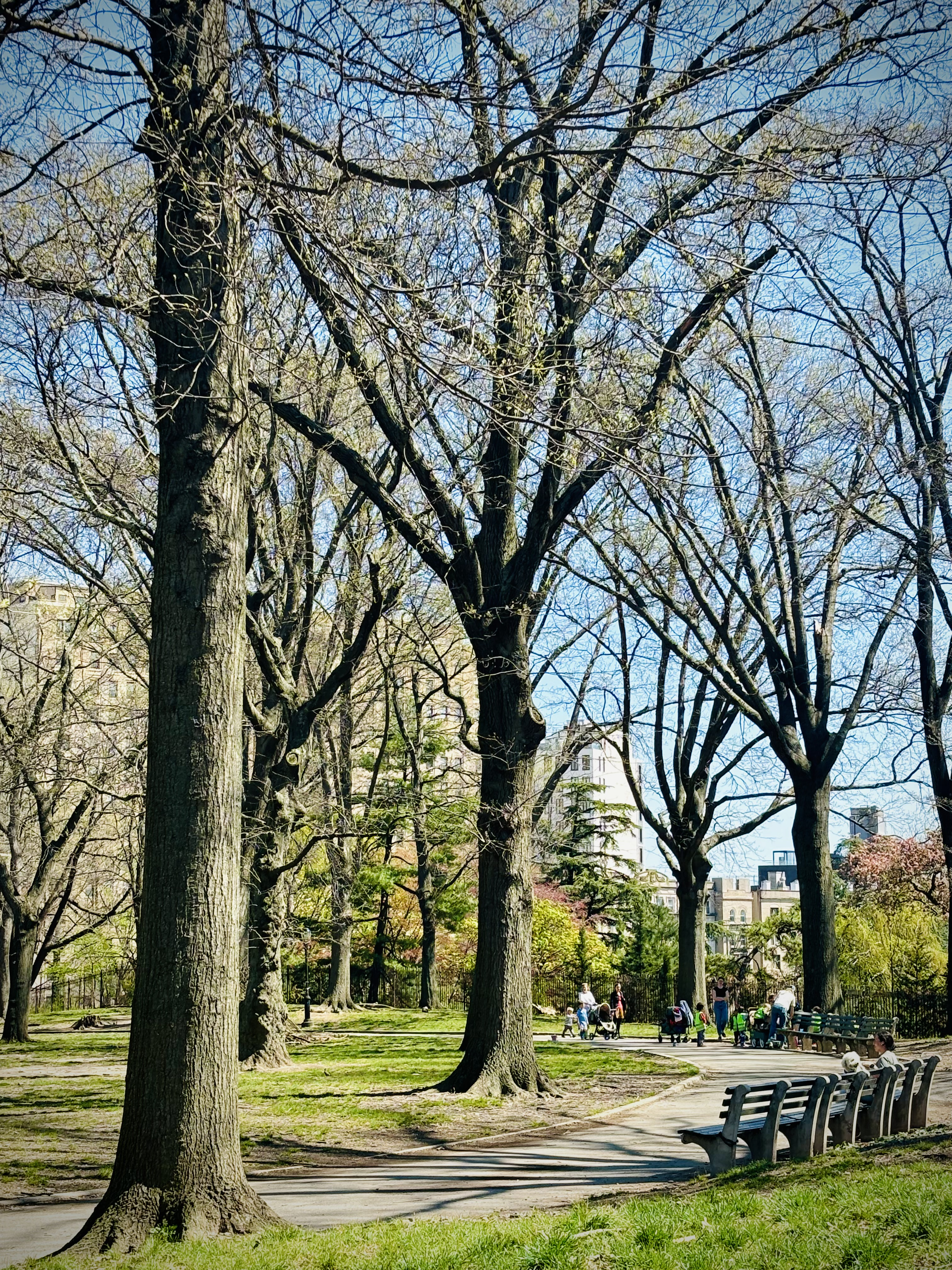

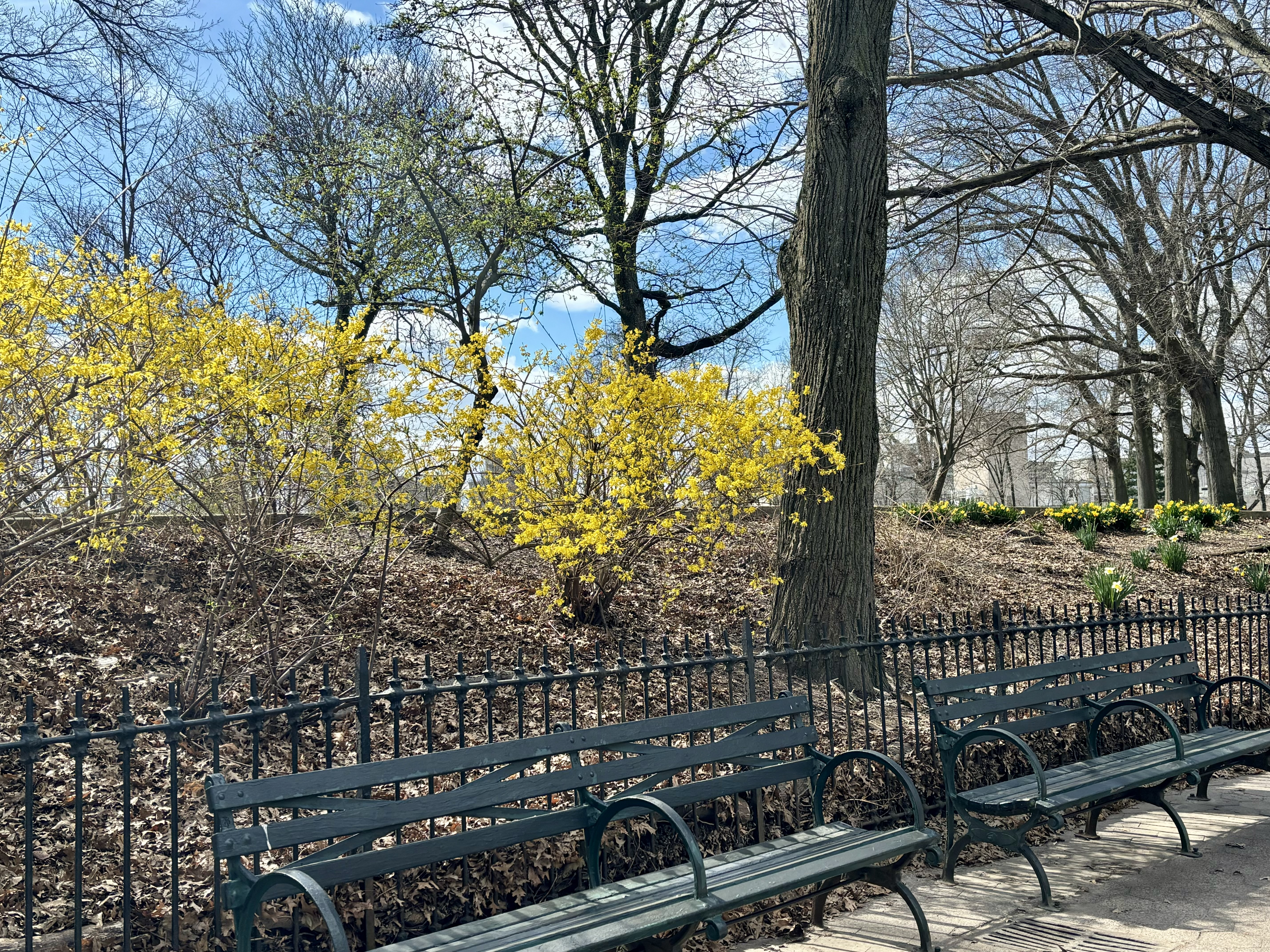

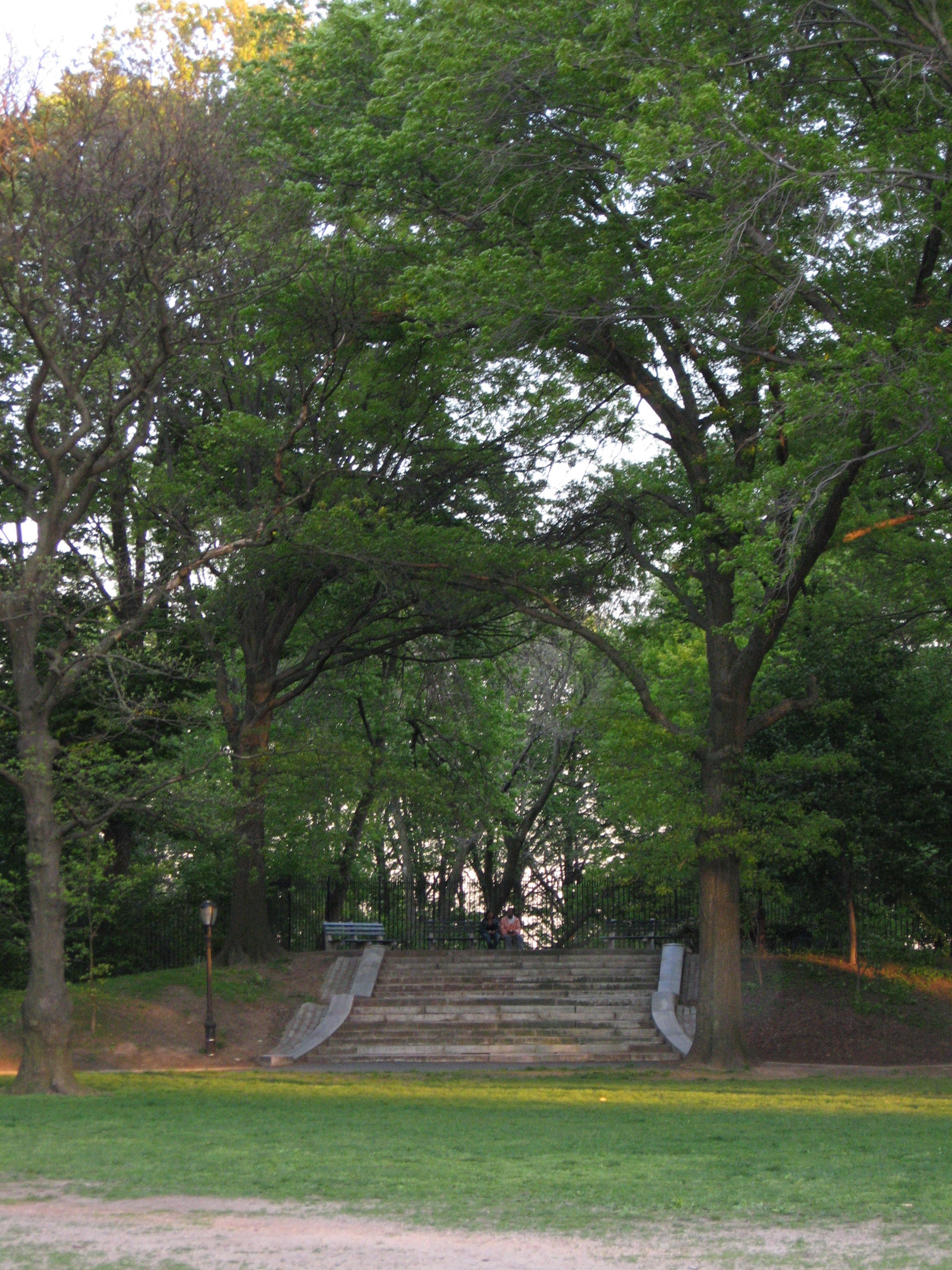
The lookout in Mount Prospect Park

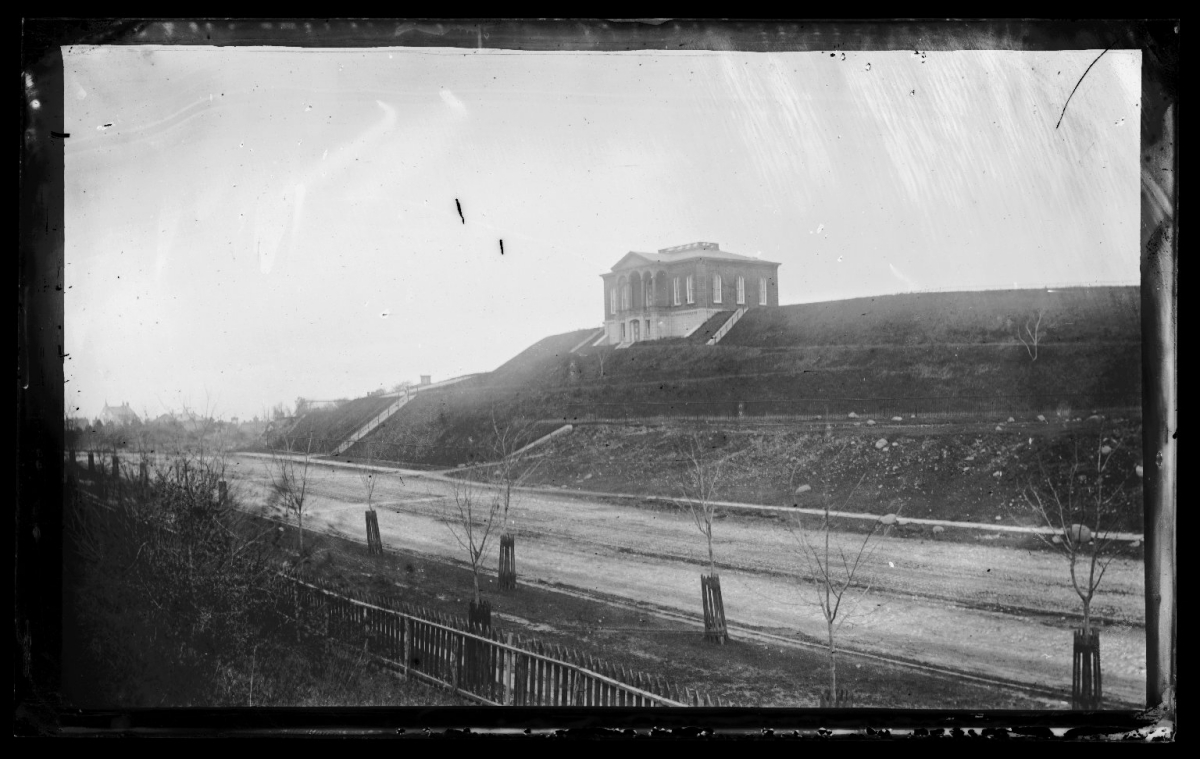
Reservoir, late 19th century

Mount Prospect Park is a 7.79-acre (3.15 ha) park in the central portion of the New York City borough of Brooklyn. It includes Mount Prospect, the second highest point in Brooklyn. It is located on Eastern Parkway near Underhill Avenue, close to Grand Army Plaza. The park is operated by the New York City Department of Parks and Recreation.

It is a separate entity from the much larger and better-known Prospect Park, which is across Flatbush Avenue from Mount Prospect Park. Mount Prospect Park is on the same block as three other Brooklyn cultural institutions—the Brooklyn Museum to the east, Brooklyn Botanic Garden to the south, and the Central Library of the Brooklyn Public Library to the west.

== History ==
Until the 19th century, the site had sweeping views of Manhattan, Brooklyn, and parts of New Jersey and Staten Island to the west, the Atlantic Ocean to the south, and Long Island to the east. Mount Prospect Park was named for these views. Peak elevation is 200 feet (61 m) above sea level. It was a lookout point for Continental Army troops defending the Heights of Guan in 1776. The Battle of Long Island (sometimes called Battle of Brooklyn) was fought nearby. Mount Prospect Park is designated by the NYC Department of Parks as a site of historical significance and is part of the Historical Signs Project.

In 1856, the then City of Brooklyn built a reservoir atop Mt. Prospect, soon to be supplemented by the larger Ridgewood Reservoir. In 1860, Mt. Prospect was to be included in the city's ambitious new Prospect Park, to be designed by Calvert Vaux and Frederick Law Olmsted, who were in the process of designing the more famous Central Park for New York City. The designers felt that the fact that Flatbush Avenue, the main roadway from Brooklyn to Flatbush, would cut through the park meant that the eastern portion of potential parkland including Mt. Prospect should not be included.

Brooklyn City kept control of the land, which then passed to the City of Greater New York in 1898. Various plans were made for the rejected parkland, including its division into city streets and lots. The major portion of the land became Institute Park, a private park, which was developed into today's Brooklyn Botanic Garden, still a private institution. The botanic garden opened in 1911.

The City retained the reservoir at Mount Prospect until it was deemed obsolete due to the shifting of the New York City water supply system to sources in Upstate New York. New York City Water Tunnel Number 2, completed in 1936, rendered the Mount Prospect reservoir unnecessary and the Department of Water Supply, Gas and Electricity gave the site to the Park Department. Demolition of the reservoir began in 1938. The park was dedicated on May 27, 1939.

In 2024, the administration of Mayor Eric Adams proposed constructing a skatepark, the Brooklyn Skate Garden, within Mount Prospect Park as part of a joint initiative with the Skatepark Project. The proposal drew opposition from local residents and Brooklyn Community Board 9, while local group Friends of Mount Prospect Park asked the New York City Comptroller to investigate the agreement with the Skatepark Project that allowed the skatepark's construction. In March 2026, the planned 40,000 square feet (3,700 m^{2}) skatepark was revised to 19,500 square feet (1,810 m^{2}).
