= Brooklyn–Queens Greenway =

Bike and walking path in New York City

Coordinates: 40.697°N 73.860°W

The Brooklyn–Queens Greenway is the plan for a linear pedestrian/cyclist path in the New York City boroughs of Brooklyn and Queens. Although proposals for this path to be fully separated from automobile traffic has existed for decades, only sections have been constructed with large unprotected gaps between them. The fully planned path will connect Coney Island in the south of Brooklyn to Fort Totten in the north of Queens.

The completed path would connect major sites in the two boroughs, such as the New York Aquarium, the Brooklyn Museum, the Brooklyn Botanic Garden, the New York Hall of Science, the Queens Botanical Garden, and the Kissena Park velodrome. The 40-mile (64 km) route would link up paths in Prospect Park, along Eastern Parkway and Ocean Parkway in Brooklyn, and in Alley Pond Park, Cunningham Park, Forest Park, Kissena Park and Ridgewood Reservoir in Queens, in addition to the planned greenways Motor Parkway East, Long Island Greenway, and Northern Queens Waterfront Greenway.

== Construction ==
The greenway sections are being built and managed under the joint auspices of the New York City Department of Transportation and the New York City Department of Parks and Recreation.

Page 10 of A Greenway Plan For New York City 1993

Building on the greenway paths of Frederick Law Olmsted and Robert Moses, a Greenway Master Plan was released in 1993 by the Department of City Planning, largely due to pressure starting in 1987 from David Lutz, the director of Neighborhood Open Space Coalition. According to the 1993 report, only 59 miles of the proposed 350 mile city-wide greenway exists in usable condition, 106 miles are need of substantial improvement, and 183 miles are proposed new paths; most of the Brooklyn–Queens Greenway is listed as "needed improvement", but there were some proposed additions such as a path over the Whitestone Bridge.

Under the Michael Bloomberg administration a Brooklyn-Queens Greenway Guide was released. The 77 page document shows route directions, maps, and areas of interest. One paragraph spoke about improvements to the greenway: "Among the projects in development are the Laurelton Southern Greenway, a 32-mile greenway, which will run along the southern and eastern shores of Queens and eastern Brooklyn, connecting Highland Park to Fort Totten and Little Bay Park. The Queens East River and North Shore Greenway is a 10.6 mile greenway which will run from the Pulaski Bridge in Queens to the Flushing Bay Promenade along the East River and North Shore shorelines in Queens. Finally, the Brooklyn Waterfront Greenway will run along Brooklyn's East River waterfront from the Pulaski Bridge to Erie Basin and beyond to Pier 69 in Bay Ridge."

Starting in 2019, the Department of Parks and Recreation began "Destination: Greenways!" a project to fast-track greenway improvements in sections of both Brooklyn and Queens. Community visioning sessions happened in 2020 and conceptual sketches were released in 2022. As of 2024, none of the projects in Queens have started construction even though $40 million in funding has been dedicated to the project.

In 2022 the New York City Council passed Local Law 115 which requires NYC DOT and Parks to publish a citywide greenway plan in 2025, and annual updates thereafter. The Eric Adams Administration published the Greater Greenways: NYC Greenway Plan dated December 31st, 2024, though released later. The document mentions the Destination: Greenways! for both Brooklyn and Queens as "ongoing" projects. The report was criticized for being released seven months after the law required it to be published and for whitewashing a mayoral term of scaling back efforts new bike/pedestrian safety infrastructure.

As a member of the City Council, Sandra Ung allocated funds to the Eastern Queens segment of the Brooklyn–Queens Greenway on multiple occasions, including $6 million in 2023 and $11.9 million in 2024. She has also questioned the Parks Commissioner about the costs and timelines of capital projects following prolonged delays between the allocation of her funding and the start of construction.

== Queens ==
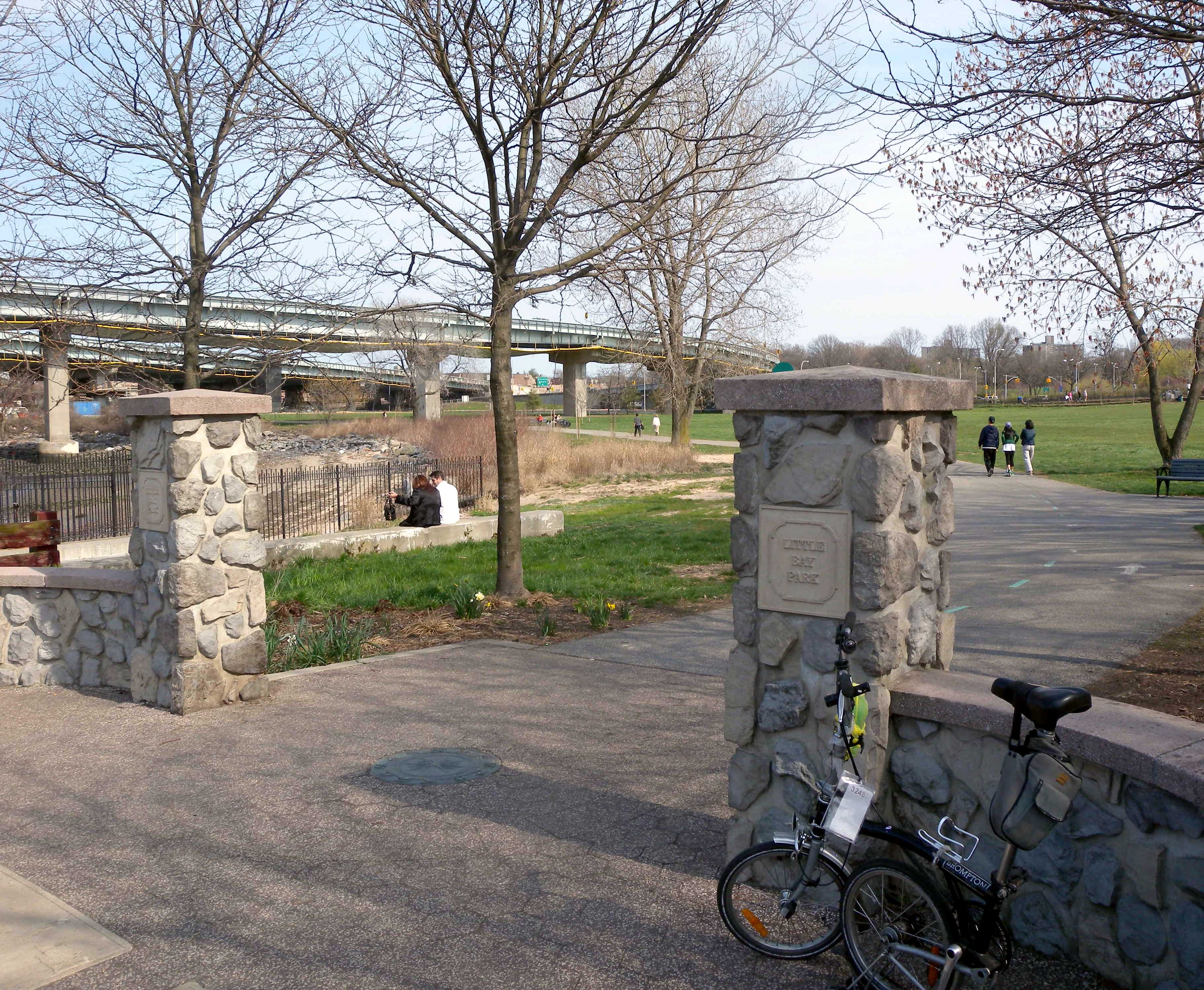
North end

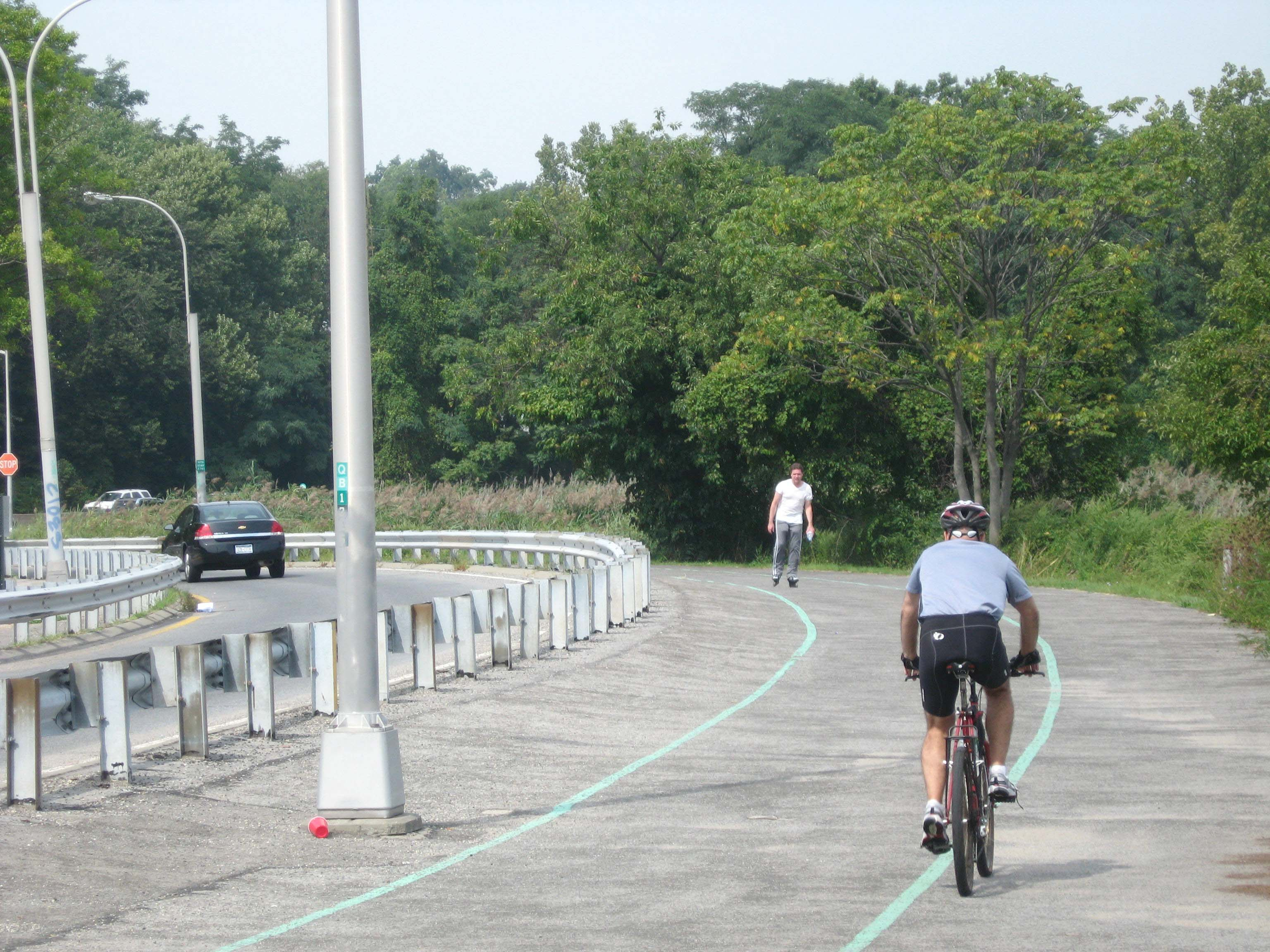
Joe Michael's Mile

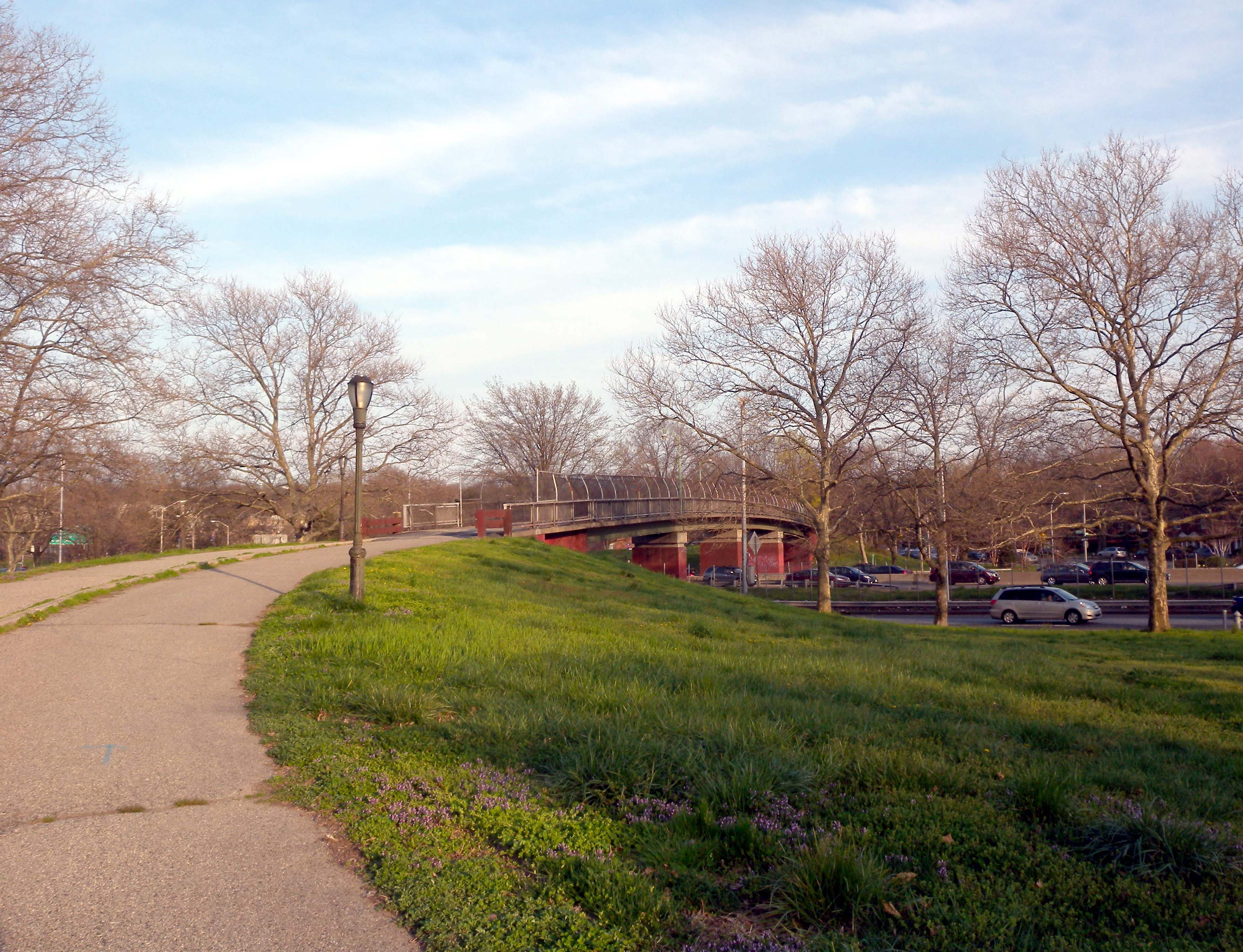
Crossing Long Island Expressway to Cunningham Park

The northern terminus of the Brooklyn–Queens Greenway is in Little Bay Park, near the north end of Utopia Parkway in the shadow of the Throgs Neck Bridge. Passing the entrance to Fort Totten Park, the Greenway runs south, parallel to the Cross Island Parkway and is known as "Joe Michaels Mile." After crossing busy Northern Boulevard, the route becomes a well signed bike route along quiet residential streets, climbing to the former Long Island Motor Parkway.

The LIMP section of the Greenway is above-grade and most is closed to motor vehicle traffic. Using the LIMP, a branch of the Greenway goes eastward into Alley Pond Park to picnic tables, tennis courts and locker rooms. This eastern branch proceeds to the Alley Pond Adventure Course and the Winchester Boulevard bike lane.

The westward or main line of the Greenway makes its way through Cunningham Park and Kissena Park, and eventually goes around the south side of Queens Botanical Garden on streets, crossing College Point Boulevard on its own high overpass into Flushing Meadows-Corona Park.

Once in Flushing Meadows, the Greenway runs along the eastern shores of both Meadow and Willow Lakes, exiting the park onto Jewel Avenue. The route continues on quiet residential streets such as Hoover and Coolidge Avenues, and on more heavily trafficked ones such as Main Street, and crosses Queens Boulevard. The Greenway enters Forest Park at the Overlook and continues down Forest Park Drive passing the Urban Park Ranger station at Woodhaven Boulevard, the George Seuffert, Sr. Bandshell, and the Forest Park Golf Course. Exiting the park, the Greenway continues along parts of Cooper Avenue and other local streets to Highland Park and the Ridgewood Reservoir.

== Brooklyn ==
After exiting Highland Park, the Brooklyn leg of the Greenway uses various local streets in East New York to connect to Eastern Parkway. From here to the end, there is little mixing with motor traffic for the 3-mile (5 km) Eastern Parkway bike route, 2 miles (3 km) through Prospect Park, and the 5-mile (8 km) Ocean Parkway to the southern terminus at the Riegelmann Boardwalk in Coney Island. The Brooklyn portion is less hilly than the Queens portion, except in Prospect Park where it crosses over the terminal moraine that divides Long Island in half.

== See also ==
- Cycling in New York City
- Manhattan Waterfront Greenway
