= Highland Park (Brooklyn) =

Public park in Brooklyn, New York

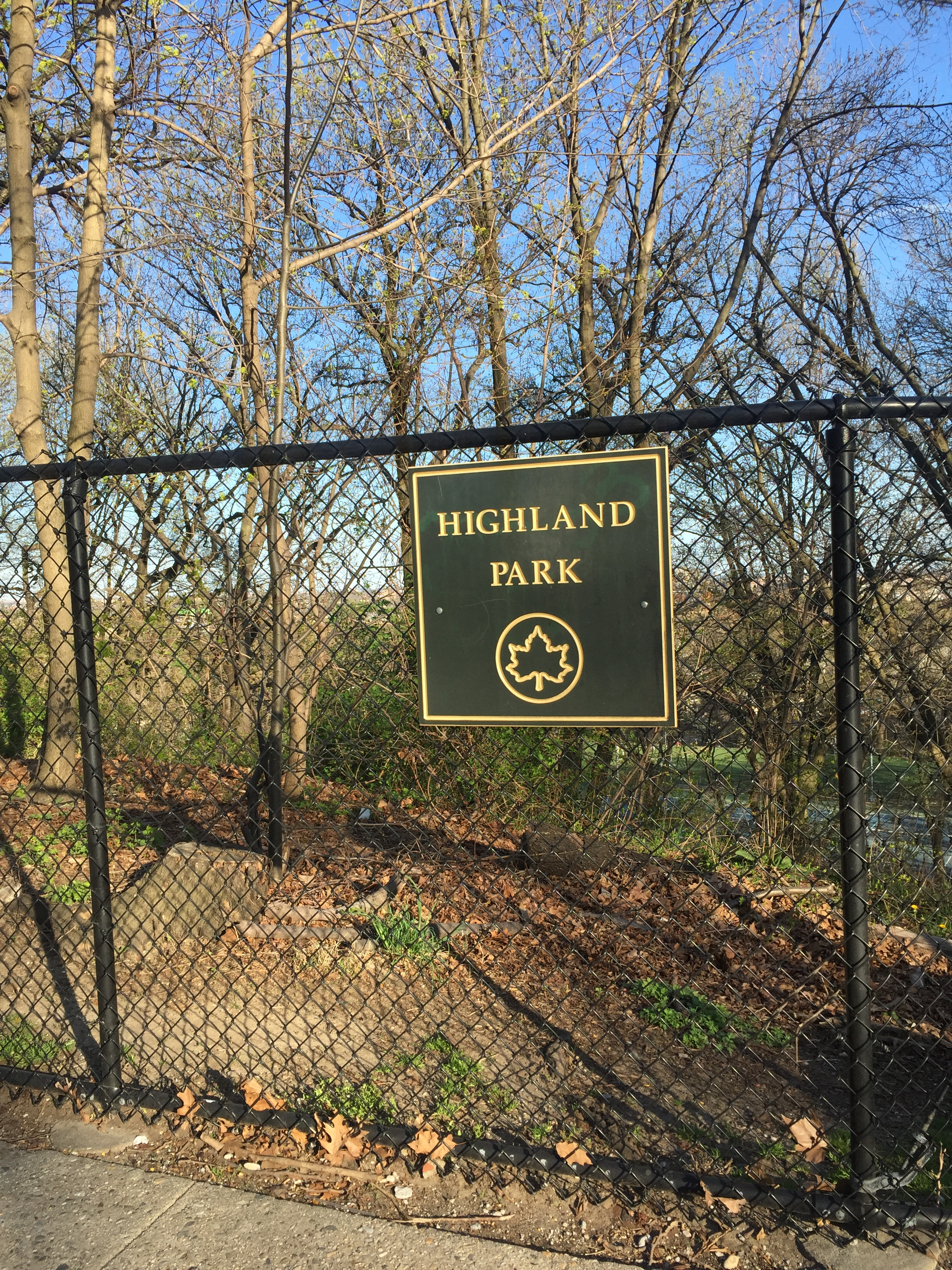
- Interactive map of Highland Park
- Location: Brooklyn, New York City
- Coordinates: 40.683438°N 73.888428°W
- Area: 141.28 acres (0.5717 km^{2})
- Created: 1901
- Operator: NYC Parks
- Status: Open all year

Highland Park is a park located in Brooklyn, New York City, on the border with Queens. Established in 1901, Highland Park borders Cypress Hills, Brooklyn—part of the East New York neighborhood—to its south, and it abuts Glendale and Ridgewood, Queens, to its north.

== Historic use ==
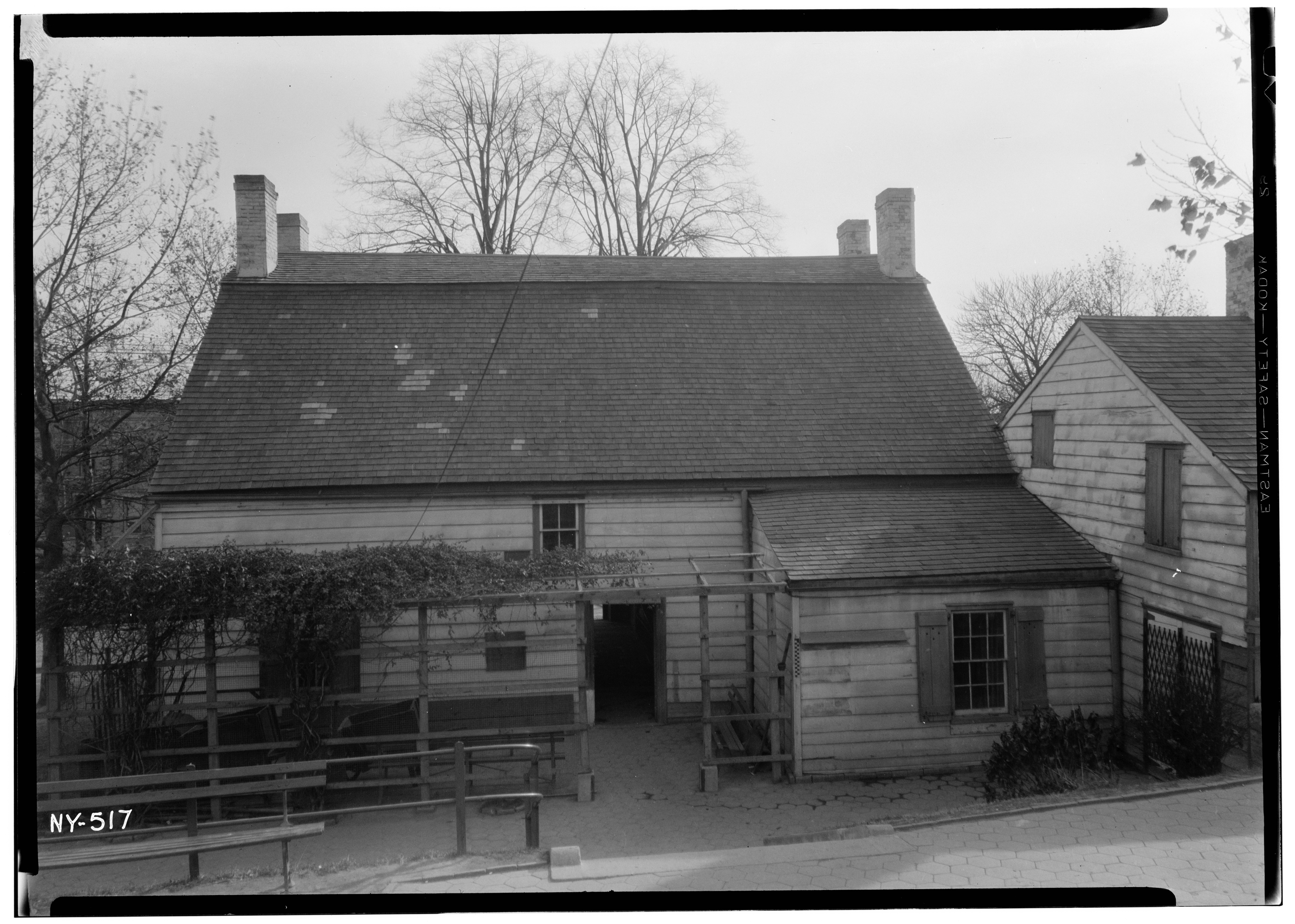
Houses in the area in 1936

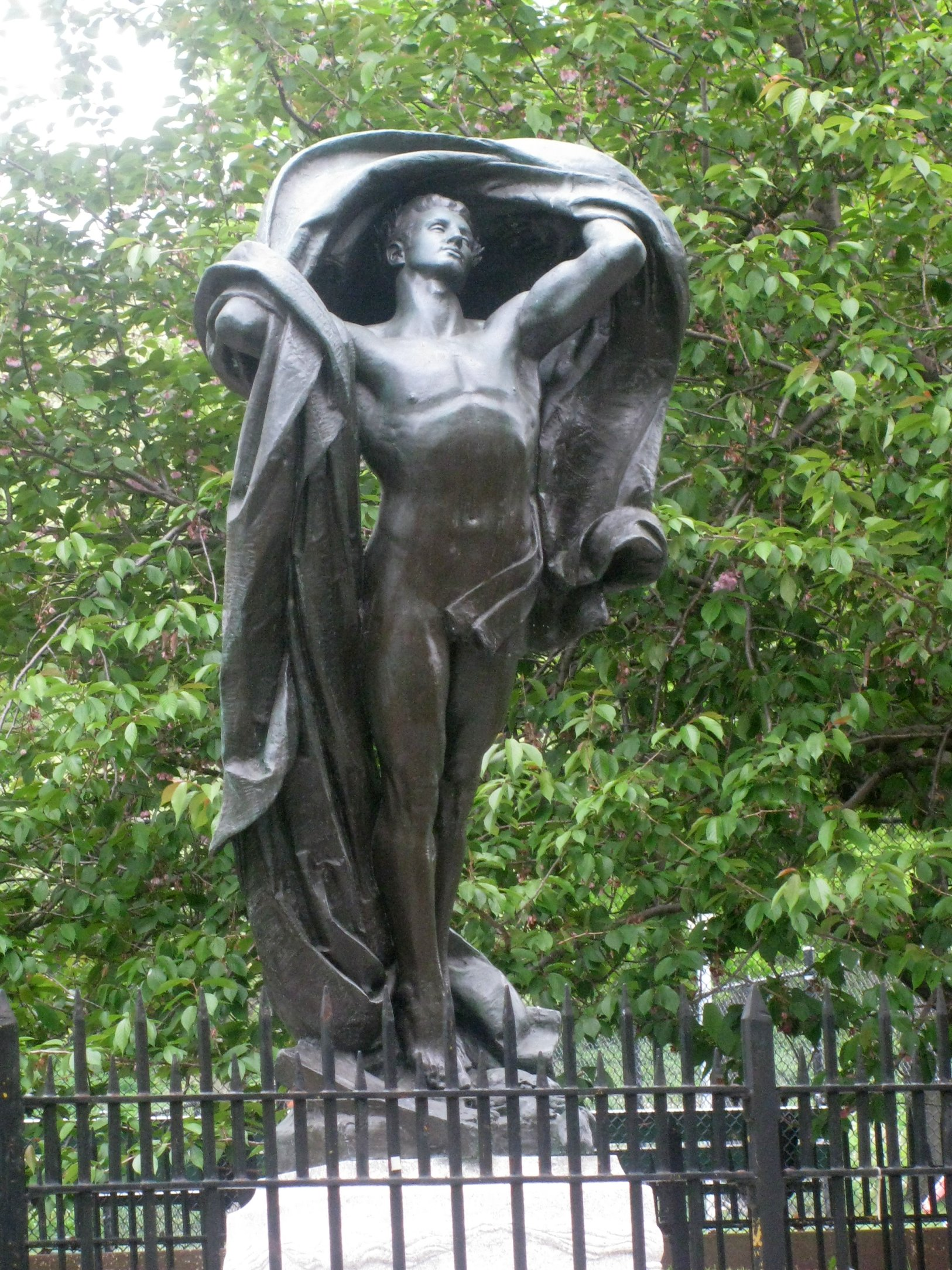
The Dawn of Glory World War I monument by Pietro Montana

Highland Park was created on the land immediately surrounding Ridgewood Reservoir that was purchased by the City of Brooklyn in 1891 under the jurisdiction of the Highland Park Society. Initially known as Ridgewood Park, between 1901 and 1905 the Brooklyn Department of Parks began improving the area with several structures, a rustic bridge, roads, footpaths, a flower garden and a new lake and fountain. In 1905, the City expanded the park by purchasing the Schenck estate just to the south of the Reservoir. The final expansion occurred in 1906 with purchase of a third parcel to the west from the Department of Water.

The park from its earliest days has been a recreational haven for residents of both Brooklyn and Queens. The park ultimately included football fields, baseball fields, tennis courts and (in the winter) a frozen pond for skating. An aquatic garden was added in 1907 and a children's farm garden in 1915. The park is home to The Dawn of Glory World War I monument by sculptor Pietro Montana (dedicated 1925). In 1991 the western section of the park was renamed the Vito P. Battista Playground in memory of Vito Piranesi Battista, a local educator and member of the New York State Assembly.

Ridgewood Reservoir was made obsolete by expansion of the city's Catskill and Delaware water systems although it remained in service until 1959. The third basin was used as a backup reservoir with water from the Catskill system until it was finally decommissioned and drained in 1989. The fenced-in basins returned to a natural state, becoming home to a birch forest and grassy marsh and hosting a wide variety of flora and fauna.

New York Road Runners hosts a weekly 2.9-mile Open Run.

== Restoration ==
In 2004, the reservoir was turned over to the New York City Department of Parks and Recreation for integration into Highland Park. In October 2007, the Parks Commissioner Adrian Benepe quietly unveiled a contract to breach one of the reservoir basins and clear 20 acres (81,000 m^{2}) for ball fields. However, on June 26, 2008, New York City Comptroller William C. Thompson, Jr. rejected that contract for the new development, citing concerns about the environmental impact, increased truck traffic, and the vendor selection process.

Finally, in October 2013 the city announced the completion of a substantial renovation project that added handicapped-accessible and bicycle-friendly pathways (including one around the reservoir) to the park, as well as new fencing, pathways, lighting, and plantings. However the reservoir itself remains fenced off as a wildlife area, and no new ball fields were constructed. The $6.92 million cost was far less than the $50 million that was forecast for the more ambitious project in 2007.
