= Ridgewood Reservoir =

Decommissioned reservoir in New York City

- U.S. National Register of Historic Places
- New York State Register of Historic Places
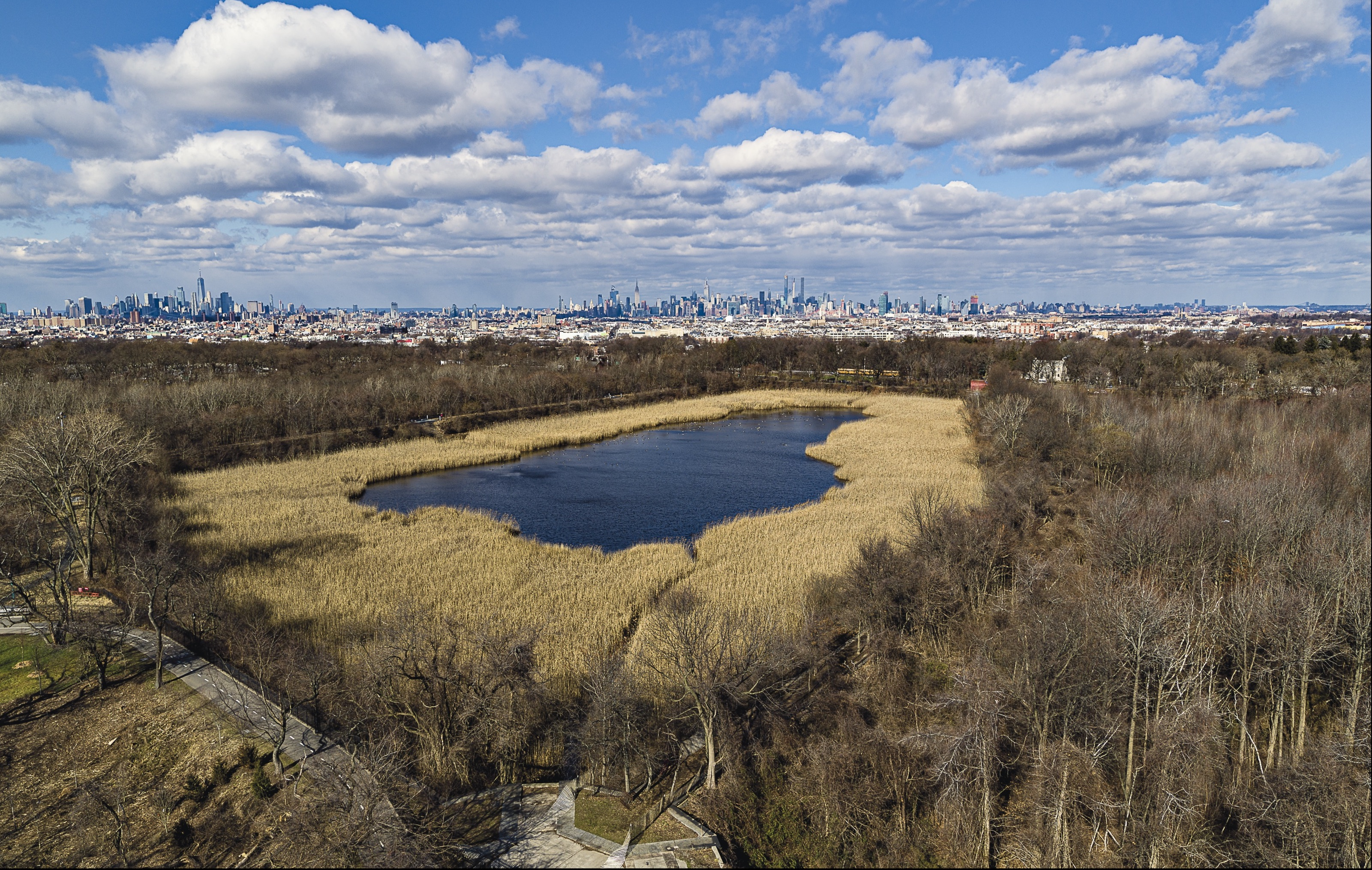
- Aerial photo showing the three basins of the reservoir with the Manhattan skyline in the background, February 2020

- Location within New York City Location within New York Location within the United States
- Location: Jackie Robinson Parkway, Vermont Place, Cypress Hills Street, & Highland Boulevard
- Coordinates: 40.69°N 73.89°W
- Area: 50 acres (20 ha)
- Built: 1856-1858
- Engineers: James P. Kirkwood of H.S. Welles & Co.
- Architectural style: Romanesque Revival
- NRHP reference No.: 100002074
- NYSRHP No.: 08101.012051

Significant dates
- Added to NRHP: February 2, 2018
- Designated NYSRHP: December 14, 2017

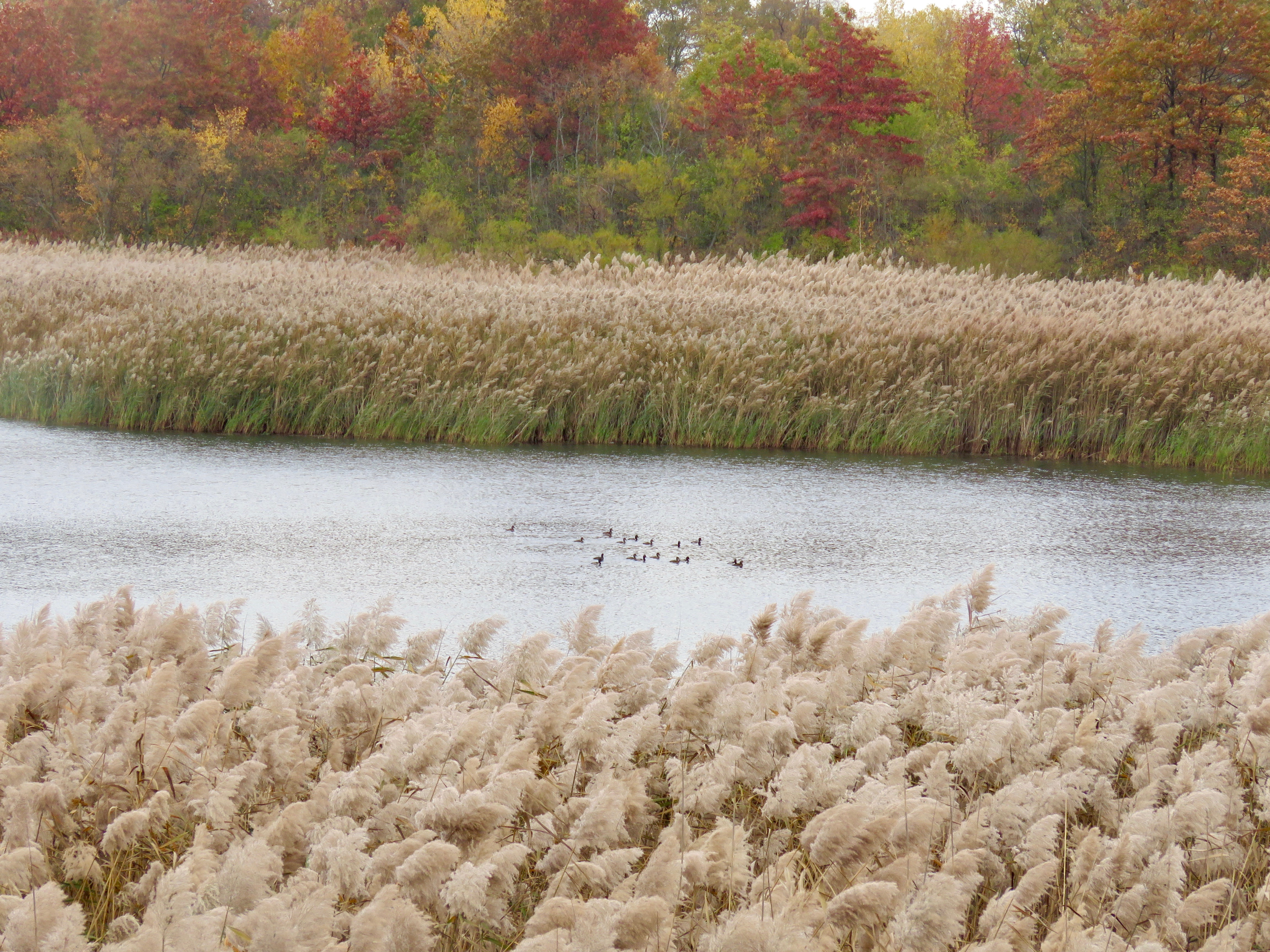
Ring-necked ducks in the middle basin, November 2016

Ridgewood Reservoir is a decommissioned 19th century reservoir and freshwater wetland on the border between the New York City boroughs of Brooklyn and Queens, within what is now Highland Park. Although the reservoir was originally built to secure a reliable water supply for the City of Brooklyn, it is positioned on the Queens side of the border in the neighborhood of Glendale. The reservoir and park are bounded on the north by the Jackie Robinson Parkway, on the south by Highland Boulevard, on the west by Vermont Place and on the east by Cypress Hills National Cemetery.

The reservoir was named after the Ridgewood Ponds in Nassau County, which provided the reservoir's eastern water source. Subsequently, the neighborhood north of the Reservoir became known as Ridgewood.

Following decommissioning and abandonment, the reservoir naturally became a lush freshwater wetland. This ecosystem attracted a wide variety of fauna and flora, including some threatened and endangered species such as the short-eared owl and pied-billed grebe. The bicycling trail around the reservoir perimeter became part of the 40-mile (64 km) Brooklyn-Queens Greenway.

Between 2004 and 2017, the Ridgewood Reservoir's future was in question, as the New York City Parks Department and the New York State Department of Environmental Conservation each proposed plans that would have breached the reservoir's basins and disrupted the wetland ecosystem. These plans were dropped after opposition from local community groups who sought to preserve the reservoir's natural setting. In 2018, the reservoir was listed on the National Register of Historic Places and was officially designated by the New York State Department of Environmental Conservation as a Class I freshwater wetland, ensuring its preservation as a natural space.

== Construction ==
Ridgewood Reservoir was built by the City of Brooklyn, New York, which was rapidly outgrowing its local water supplies. In 1851 the City thought it was failing to attract business firms that would have moved to Brooklyn if it had as reliable a water source as New York City's Croton Aqueduct. Various sources were proposed. The Croton River was already being used as the City of New York's water supply, and it did not have the capacity to serve the City of Brooklyn as well. The Bronx River was both inadequate and difficult to access. Wells in and near Brooklyn were inadequate both in quantity and quality. Natural lakes on Long Island were few and could not provide enough water. The only solution was to tap the many small streams on Long Island and conduct their water to Brooklyn to be lifted into an elevated reservoir.

The original design of the Ridgewood Reservoir as well as the final specifications for the Brooklyn Water Works system were designed by Brooklyn civil engineer Samuel McElroy. This original design called for three basins, but engineer James P. Kirkwood later altered the designs and instead built a double basin. The new double reservoir was built in Snediker's Cornfield on a hilltop near Evergreen Cemetery in what was once part of Ridgewood, Queens (this section of Queens is now part of Glendale) and was sealed by puddling with clay. The walls were faced with fieldstone and mortar. Ground was broken for the reservoir's construction on July 11, 1856, and the reservoir's water was initially raised on November 18, 1858.

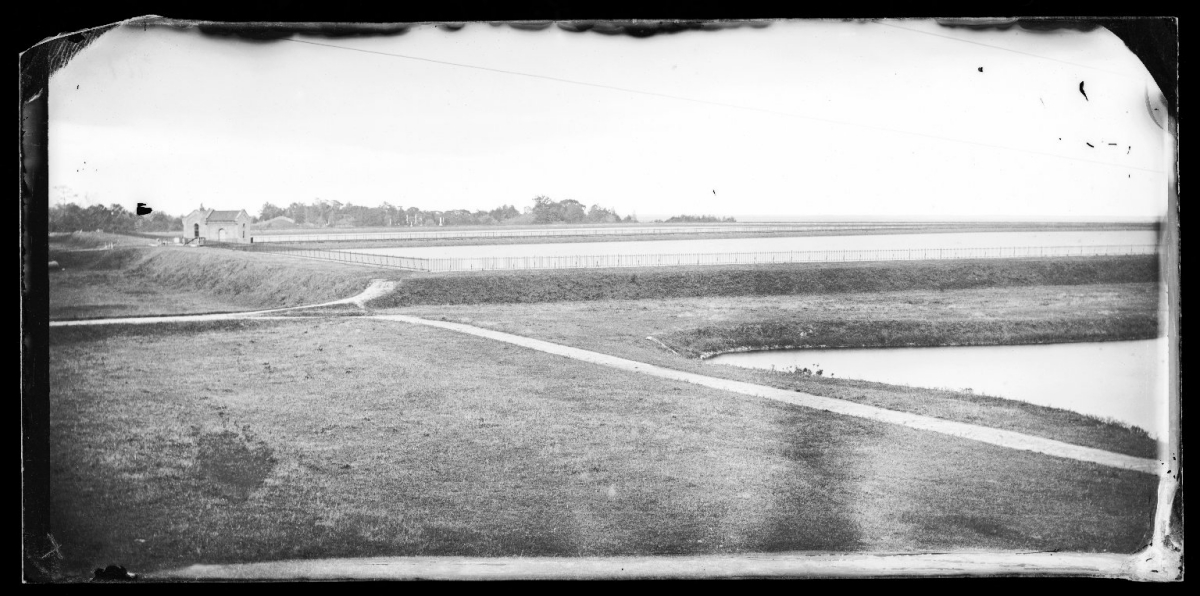
Ridgewood Reservoir, Brooklyn, ca. 1872–1887. (5832944747)

In 1862, the water supply for the reservoir consisted of six dammed streams in what is now Queens and Nassau Counties: Jamaica Stream (Baisley Pond), Simonson's Stream, Clear Stream, Valley Stream, Pine's Stream, and Hempstead Stream (Hempstead Lake). This water was carried in a 12-mile-long masonry conduit, called the Ridgewood Aqueduct, to a pumping station at Atlantic Avenue and Chestnut Street. There, steam-powered pumps, each with a capacity of 14 million gallons (53,000 m^{3}) per day, forced the water up through a reinforced tube into the high reservoir whence it was distributed. By 1868 the Ridgewood Reservoir held an average of 154.4 million gallons (584,000 m^{3}) daily, enough to supply the City of Brooklyn for ten days at that time.

The Ridgewood Reservoir's innovative use of driven wells was notable for the time; an 1886 Scientific American article states that the reservoir's system of driven wells “has attracted widespread attention because of the originality and boldness of the plans and the perfect success attained.” In the late nineteenth century, Brooklyn was the largest American city whose water supply system relied on driven wells. Other large American cities chose to adopt this technology after the success of the Ridgewood Reservoir's driven well system. By 1900, Lowell, Massachusetts and Newark, New Jersey—two of the nation's most important industrial centers at the time—had both followed Brooklyn's example by installing their own municipal water systems that used driven wells. At this time, Brooklyn obtained over 45 million gallons of water per day from driven wells at the Ridgewood Reservoir and other sites.

In subsequent decades the Brooklyn Water Works system was repeatedly expanded by adding wells and collection reservoirs, extending the conduit farther east, and adding pumps. The Ridgewood Reservoir's third basin was completed in 1891. Farmers in southern Queens County complained that Brooklyn's thirst was lowering the water table. Late in the century, the conduit was extended to a large pumping station in Massapequa, some 30 miles (48 km) away. Efforts to extend it farther were thwarted by legislation protecting the water of Suffolk County. Force Tube Avenue, Conduit Boulevard, and Sunrise Highway were built, in part, atop the water conduit or within its right of way, early in the 20th century.

Highland Park was created on land immediately surrounding Ridgewood Reservoir that was purchased by the City of Brooklyn in 1891 under the jurisdiction of the Highland Park Society. The park was constructed between 1901 and 1906 and included additional parcels purchased to the south and west.

== Decommissioning ==
In 1898, Brooklyn merged with the City of Greater New York, thus gaining access to the superior New York City water supply system. Ridgewood Reservoir was expensive to operate because of the need for pumping and was slowly made obsolete by expansion of New York City's Catskill and Delaware water systems. Ridgewood Reservoir became a backup reservoir in 1959 with the third basin being filled with water from the Catskill system. The reservoir was last used in a drought in the 1960s. During the 1970s the reservoir was the site of illegal swimming and a number of drownings. The reservoir was finally decommissioned and drained in 1989.

Some of the Nassau County pumping stations including the one at Milburn (now Baldwin) survived into the 21st century as ruins. Valley Stream State Park, Hempstead Lake State Park, and other South Shore lakes and parks were originally Brooklyn Water Works reservoirs.

In 2004, the reservoir was officially turned over to the Department of Parks for more extensive integration into Highland Park.

== Ecological significance ==
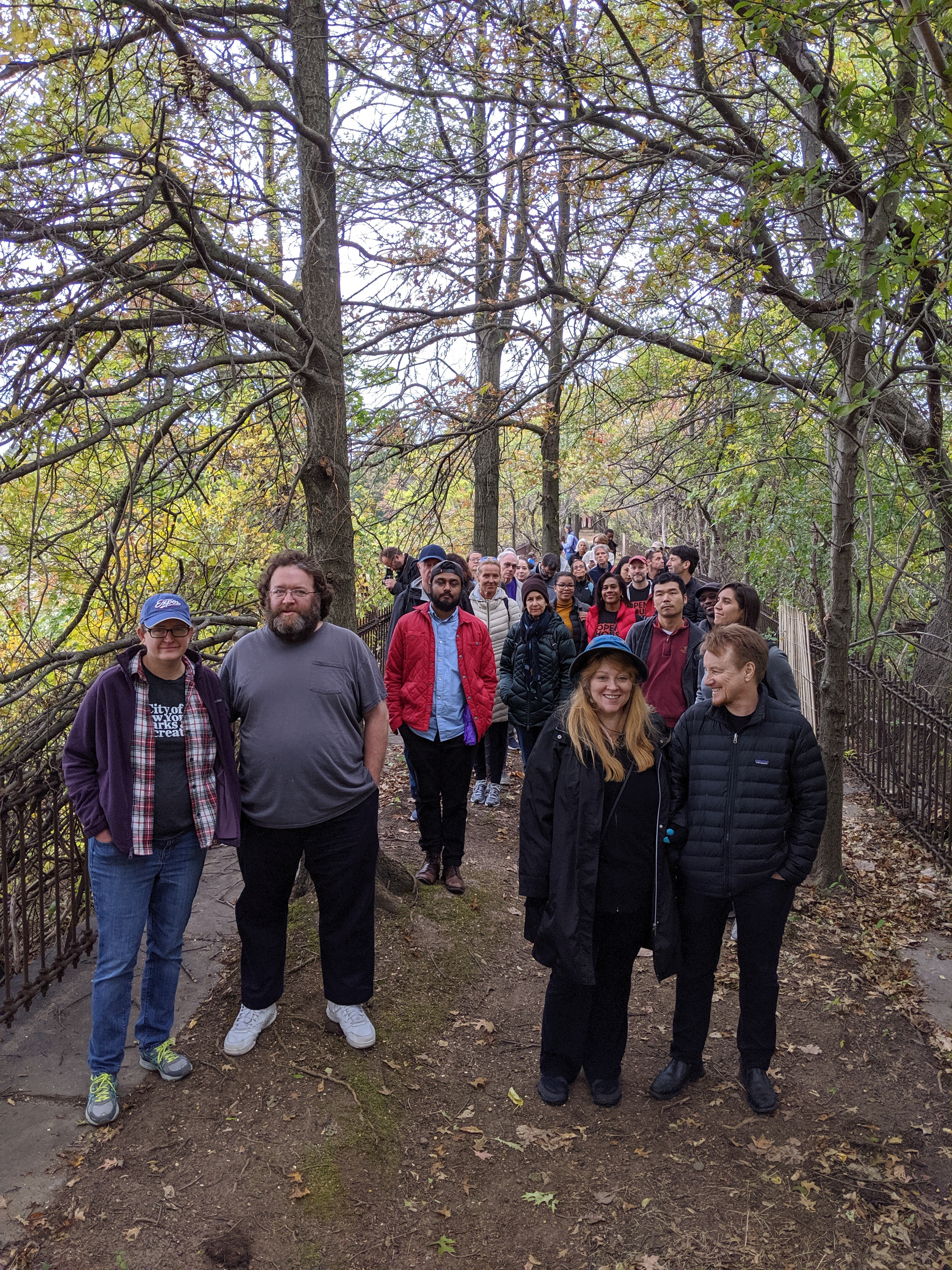
Visitors explore the newly restored East Causeway as part of OHNY weekend, October 2019

Since the Ridgewood Reservoir was decommissioned, it has naturally become reforested and has developed into a thriving wetland ecosystem. It currently contains a wide range of natural environments, including woodlands, swamp, standing water wetlands, coastal swamp forest, bog, and open grassy area. The reservoir is home to a wide range of flora and fauna, including 156 species of birds, 175 plant species, and numerous species of insects. The evolving fresh-water site has become an important nearby oasis on the Atlantic Flyway and is a common destination for birdwatchers. The reservoir's distinct ecological setting has also made it a frequent destination for field trips and walking tours. Currently, the pond in the middle basin of the reservoir is being overgrown by invasive weeds that belong to the genus Phragmites. Left unchecked, the Phragmites would outcompete the reservoir's natural plant species and fill in the pond. Community efforts to control the reservoir's Phragmites population, via underwater weed-cutting and root removal, are ongoing.

In January 2019, the NYC Parks Department designated the Ridgewood Reservoir as a Critical Environmental Area, citing the reservoir's status as a "naturalized area that is unique within New York City and serves as an important ecological, historic, and public recreation resource."

== Redevelopment plans ==
In October 2007, New York City Parks Commissioner Adrian Benepe unveiled a plan to breach one of the reservoir basins and clear 20 acres (81,000 m^{2}) for new ball fields. This resulted in a backlash from local residents, environmentalists, and community organizations, who formed the Highland Park-Ridgewood Reservoir Alliance to oppose the plan.

On June 26, 2008, Comptroller of New York City Bill Thompson Jr. rejected the contract for the new development, citing concerns about the environmental impact, increased truck traffic, and the vendor selection process.

In 2010, the Highland Park-Ridgewood Reservoir Alliance submitted an application to the New York State Department of Environmental Conservation requesting that the Ridgewood Reservoir be classified as a wetland.

In 2014, community members learned that the NYC Parks Department was planning to construct culverts to breach the three basins. This would have destroyed the reservoir's natural ecosystem. The plans illustrated the design and construction of culverts large enough to accommodate trucks and were part of a project that the City Parks Department claimed was necessary to eliminate the risk of flooding. The City argued that unless the culverts were built, the State of New York would issue fines since the reservoir would allegedly be a flooding hazard, according to its classification as a Class C "High Hazard" dam. However, local activists argued that because the reservoir no longer impounds water, it does not pose a risk of flooding and should instead be classified as a Class D "Negligible or No Hazard" dam, rendering the construction of culverts unnecessary. Environmentalists also argued that building the culverts would violate New York State Environmental Conservation Law by adversely impacting a freshwater wetland habitat. This work was scheduled to begin in August 2014 but was put on hold after pressure from activists.

In March 2017, the state Department of Environmental Conservation reclassified the Ridgewood Reservoir as a Class A "Low Hazard" dam, such that the reservoir's basins would no longer be required to be breached to address flooding risk.

In February 2018, the Ridgewood Reservoir was officially designated as a Class I freshwater wetland by the New York State Department of Environmental Conservation. The wetland designation ensures that the Ridgewood Reservoir will be permanently preserved in a natural state, as it is now protected under the 1975 New York Freshwater Wetlands Act.

== See also ==
- List of reservoirs and dams in New York
- National Register of Historic Places listings in Brooklyn
- Timeline of Brooklyn history
