= Central Library (Brooklyn Public Library) =

Historic building in Brooklyn, New York

- Brooklyn Public Library–Central Building
- U.S. National Register of Historic Places
- New York State Register of Historic Places
- New York City Landmark
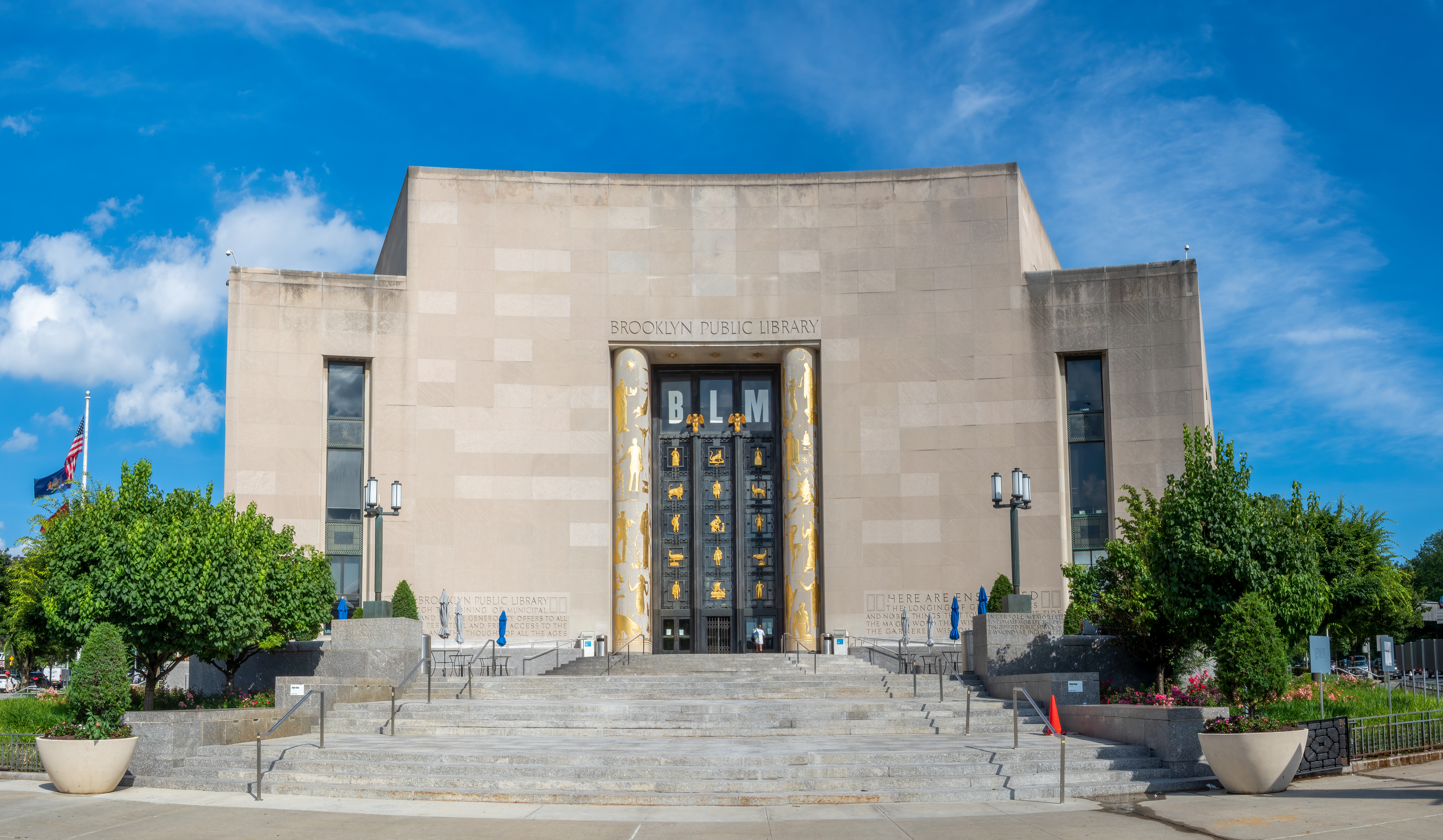
- Seen in July 2021, with Black Lives Matter sign in entryway
- Location: Grand Army Plaza; Brooklyn, New York City
- Coordinates: 40°40′21″N 73°58′06″W
- Area: 2.8 acres (1.1 ha)
- Built: 1911–1940
- Architects: Raymond F. Almirall (1911); Alfred Morton Githens and Francis Keally (1935)
- Sculptor: Thomas Hudson Jones and C. Paul Jennewein (bronze gateway)
- Architectural style: Beaux-Arts and Art Moderne
- NRHP reference No.: 01001446
- NYSRHP No.: 04701.014798
- NYCL No.: 1963

Significant dates
- Added to NRHP: January 11, 2002
- Designated NYSRHP: November 17, 2001
- Designated NYCL: June 17, 1997

The Central Library, originally the Ingersoll Memorial Library, is the main branch of the Brooklyn Public Library in Brooklyn, New York City. Located on Grand Army Plaza, at the corner of Flatbush Avenue and Eastern Parkway, it contains over 1.7 million items in its collection and has a million annual visitors. The structure was designed by the partnership of Alfred Morton Githens and Francis Keally in the Art Deco style, replacing a never-completed Beaux-Arts structure designed by Raymond Almirall. The building is a New York City designated landmark and is listed on the National Register of Historic Places.

The site of the library was selected in 1905, but groundbreaking for the Brooklyn Central Library did not begin until 1912. Escalating costs and political infighting slowed construction throughout the next two decades, and only the Flatbush Avenue wing of Almirall's building was ever completed. In 1935, Githens and Keally were commissioned to redesign the building in the Art Deco style; construction recommenced in 1938, and Almirall's building on Flatbush Avenue was largely demolished. The Central Library opened to the public on February 1, 1941, and its second floor opened in the mid-1950s. The structure was significantly renovated in the 1970s, 2000s, and 2020s.

The Central Library is a four-story building that resembles an open book as viewed from the air. The modern facade is made of limestone and contains relatively little ornamentation, except around the main entrance on Grand Army Plaza. The main entrance facade, accessed by a raised terrace, is curved and contains various inscriptions, in addition to tall, gilded columns by C. Paul Jennewein and a screen by Thomas Hudson Jones. The Flatbush Avenue wing to the southeast is longer than the Eastern Parkway wing to the east; both wings contain decorative windows and additional entrances. The library's 350,000-square-foot (33,000 m^{2}) interior is centered around a triple-height circulation room. There are reading rooms on the first through third stories, as well as an auditorium beneath the main entrance terrace.

== Site ==
The Brooklyn Central Library is in the central part of the New York City borough of Brooklyn, on the border of the Park Slope, Prospect Heights, and Crown Heights neighborhoods. It is located on a roughly triangular site facing Eastern Parkway to the north, Grand Army Plaza to the northwest, and Flatbush Avenue to the southwest. The site has dimensions of 610 feet (190 m) on Flatbush Avenue, 581 ft (177 m) to the east, and 416 ft (127 m) on Eastern Parkway. The main entrance, at the northeast corner of the building, is recessed behind a raised terrace. The Central Library's main entrance faces the Soldiers' and Sailors' Arch within Grand Army Plaza, the primary gateway to Prospect Park, to the west. The building shares a large city block with Mount Prospect Park, the Brooklyn Botanic Garden, and the Brooklyn Museum to the east and southeast.

The library building is part of a larger land lot along the eastern side of Flatbush Avenue between Grand Army Plaza and Empire Boulevard. The then-independent city of Brooklyn had acquired this land in the 1860 for the creation of modern-day Prospect Park. Egbert Viele's first proposal for Prospect Park, in 1861, called for the park to straddle Flatbush Avenue. Land acquisition began in 1860, but the onset of the American Civil War delayed further development of the park; following the war, the land to the east of Flatbush Avenue was excluded from the park. The Mount Prospect site went unused until the late 1880s, when a library was proposed for a portion of the site. Mount Prospect Park, the Brooklyn Museum, and the Brooklyn Botanic Garden occupied the remainder of the site.

== Development ==
As early as April 1889, Brooklyn's park commissioners had recommended constructing a Brooklyn central library near Grand Army Plaza, just outside Prospect Park. The Brooklyn Public Library system was approved by an Act of Legislature of the State of New York on May 3, 1892. The BPL opened its first branch library, the Bedford Library at PS 3 in Bedford–Stuyvesant, Brooklyn, in December 1897; this branch moved among various buildings, including a former mansion at 26 Brevoort Place. Although the formerly independent city of Brooklyn became part of the City of Greater New York in 1898, the BPL declined to merge with the New York Public Library (NYPL). In the long run, the BPL wanted to build a central library and a series of branch libraries throughout the borough of Brooklyn.

=== Planning ===
==== Site selection ====
By March 1900, the BPL's directors were planning to construct a central library in Brooklyn; the New York State Legislature had provided $500,000 (equivalent to $19.4 million in 2025) for the construction of such a structure. That May, the BPL's board voted to recommend that the central library be built along Eastern Parkway, as close as possible to Grand Army Plaza. Andrew Carnegie donated $1.6 million (equivalent to $61.9 million in 2025) to BPL for the construction of 20 Carnegie branch libraries in 1901, but the New York City government would only appropriate money for a central library after funding for the branch libraries had been secured. Carnegie also considered funding the central library under the condition that the BPL, the private Brooklyn Library, and the Long Island Historical Society combined their collections. At the time, several sites for a central library building were being considered, including a plot at the corner of Bedford Avenue and Herkimer Street in Bedford–Stuyvesant. The Brooklyn Library merged its sizable reference collection with that of the BPL in 1902, but the Long Island Historical Society refused to merge with the other two libraries.

Although BPL president David A. Boody urged the creation of a central library for Brooklyn, the trustees wished to first build several of the 20 Carnegie branches. By mid-1904. a committee had been created to identify and recommend sites for the Brooklyn Central Library. After a year of consultations, consulting architect A. D. F. Hamlin recommended in May 1905 that the central library be constructed at Grand Army Plaza; mayor George B. McClellan Jr. authorized the selection of that site shortly afterward. Various persons opposed the site for its small size, irregular shape, and distance from Downtown Brooklyn. New York City's parks commissioner wanted the plaza site to be used as parkland, and the director of the Brooklyn Museum wanted the site for future expansion of the museum. At McClellan's request, Carrère and Hastings, the architects of the NYPL's main branch, determined in November 1905 that Grand Army Plaza was a suitable site for a central library. The next month, the BPL's site-selection committee ratified the selection of the Plaza site. The plaza was already well served by public transit, and there were plans to extend the New York City Subway to the area.

==== Approval of Almirall's plans ====
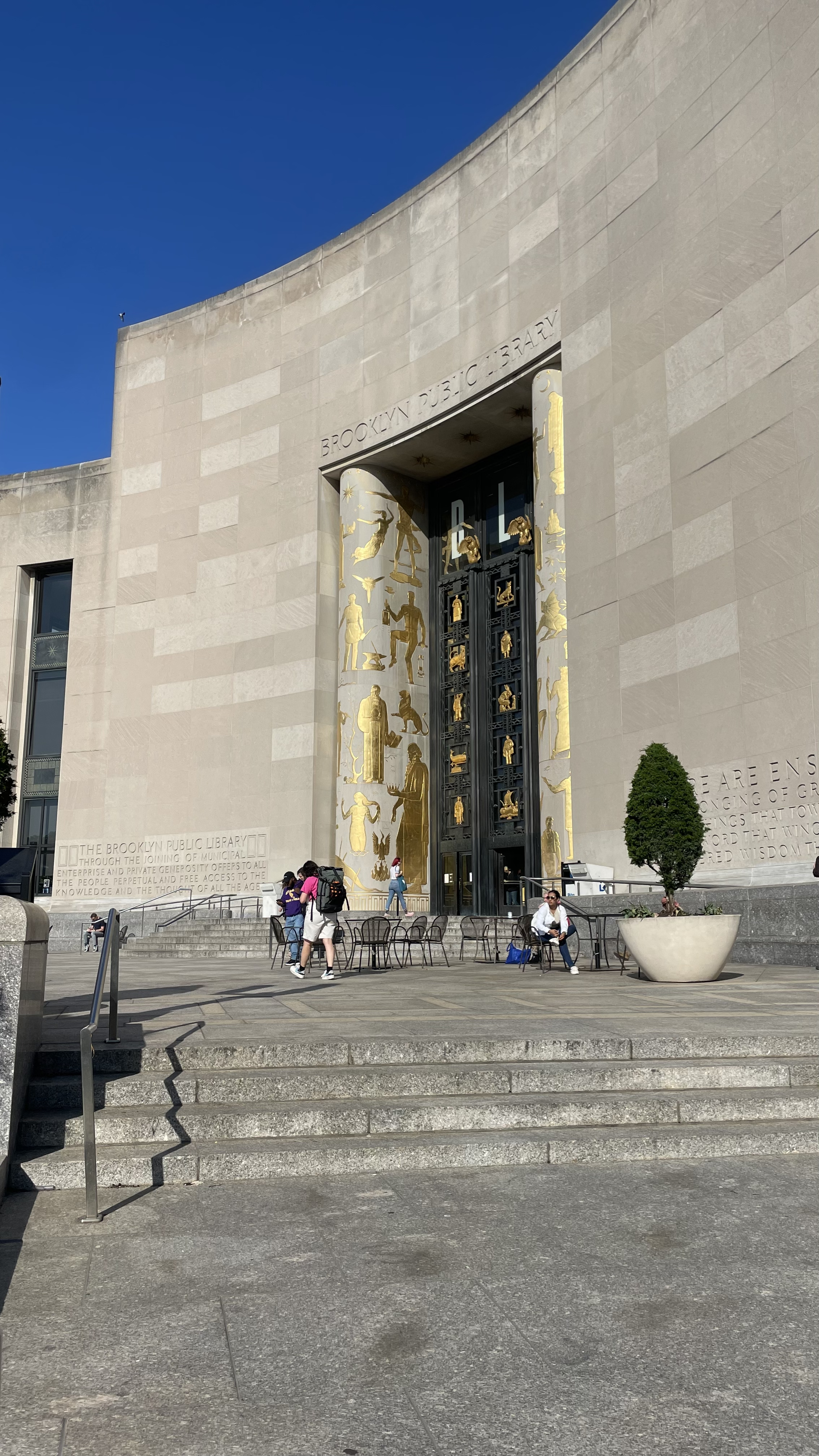
The entrance facing Grand Army Plaza

The Board of Estimate allotted $25,000 (equivalent to $895,800 in 2025) in May 1906 for the preparation of plans for the central library. Local architect Raymond F. Almirall, who had designed three Carnegie libraries in Brooklyn, was hired that July to design the Brooklyn Central Library. Almirall, Hamlin, and BPL chief librarian Frank Hill went to Europe, analyzing two dozen buildings in various cities. They wrote a lengthy report later the same year, which was presented to the BPL's trustees in October 1906. Almirall had submitted plans for a $3.25 million (equivalent to $112.3 million in 2025) central library to the BPL's directors by September 1907. The directors postponed a decision on these plans, citing uncertainty over the plaza site, before conditionally approving them that November. The Municipal Art Commission also approved the plans in December 1907.

The BPL had begun accepting bids to construct the new library and requested $300,000 from the Board of Estimate in January 1909, at which point the building's estimated cost was as high as $5 million (equivalent to $179.2 million in 2025). Later that year, Boody asked the city government to issue bonds for the project. The Board of Estimate appropriated $300,000 for the library building in 1910 and promised to give $530,000 in each of the two following fiscal years. By the time the NYPL had completed its main branch in 1911, the BPL had not even started its own central library, even though the Brooklyn Central Library had been planned before the NYPL Main Branch. Work on the Brooklyn Central Library was supposed to begin that June, but the Board of Estimate refused to grant an appropriation for the building the next month. Test borings for the site commenced in July 1911, and plans for the Flatbush Avenue wing were filed with the Bureau of Buildings in January 1912.

=== Construction of original building ===
Construction of the Brooklyn Central Library's first section spanned multiple mayoral administrations with varying levels of interest in completing the building. The Brooklyn Central Library's groundbreaking ceremony occurred on June 5, 1912, with mayor William Jay Gaynor in attendance. A contract for the foundations was awarded the same month.

==== Initial progress and work stoppage ====
Engineers surveying the site found in early 1912 that the site had large amounts of peat moss and that the building needed deep foundations because of its proximity to the Mount Prospect Reservoir. Early the following year, the BPL requested $20,000 (equivalent to $651,500 in 2025) for books for the Central Library. Workers were also busy excavating the building's foundations, but foundation contractor Charles Meads reported that the work was several months behind schedule because of inclement weather, loose ground, and a lack of funding. Although the foundation had been completed by early 1914, there was not enough money for the rest of the structure, and the city and the foundation contractor had become involved in a lawsuit over cracks in the foundation. Gaynor's successor, John Purroy Mitchel, felt that funds for the Central Library would be better spent on schools and other projects.

City aldermen appropriated $210,000 for the construction of the building's Flatbush Avenue wing in December 1915. Local newspapers reported that, if the wing were not constructed, the foundation would deteriorate. Plans for the basement and first story of the Flatbush Avenue wing were filed with the Bureau of Buildings in March 1916, at which point the wing was expected to cost $600,000. Brooklyn's borough president filed revised plans for the wing that September, and the BPL began receiving bids for the library building's construction, Brooklyn's borough president rejected all the bids in December 1916 for being too expensive; the same month, an additional $56,000 was appropriated for the project. Work on the Flatbush Avenue wing began in March 1917. Although contractor Thomas Dwyer had only just started erecting the basement and first floor by the beginning of 1919, the Brooklyn Daily Eagle said about $724,000 had been spent on the building to date, while city officials gave a different figure of $412,000. According to the city, Almirall had received $129,000 in architects' fees through the end of 1919, despite the minimal progress on the building. Local residents wanted the building's development to be accelerated, as many volumes in the BPL's collection were being damaged or were inaccessible.

No construction occurred from 1918 to 1925, while John Francis Hylan was mayor of New York City. Borough president Edward J. Riegelmann requested another $1 million (equivalent to $18.1 million in 2025) from the city in 1921, and city officials agreed to an additional appropriation that May after touring the still-incomplete edifice. The same year, a fence was erected around the site. Governor Nathan L. Miller signed legislation in April 1922 authorizing officials to raise money for the building's completion. Afterward, Riegelmann asked the Board of Estimate for permission to raise $11 million in bonds for the Central Library. Because Hylan opposed further funding for the building, the Board of Estimate notified Riegelmann in July 1923 that it would not provide further funding for the Central Library unless the plans were scaled down. Hylan's refusal to fund the Central Library became a point of contention in the 1925 New York City mayoral election, where Hylan's opponents claimed that he had doubled the city's budget without providing anything for the library building. Only one story of one wing had been completed and was covered with a temporary roof.

==== Attempts to complete the building ====
After Jimmy Walker succeeded Hylan as mayor at the beginning of 1926, his comptroller Charles W. Berry expressed support for completing the Central Library. The Board of Estimate indicated in April 1926 that it would provide $750,000 (equivalent to $13.6 million in 2025) for the Central Library, and it approved the appropriation that June. By then, the building was planned to cost $14 million to $15 million (equivalent to $255 million to $273 million in 2025). City experts recommended that, as a money-saving measure, the expensive Tennessee marble facade of the first story be replaced with cheaper limestone or Missouri marble. Despite Brooklyn officials' desire to resume work as soon as possible, the city did not award a contract for a year after receiving the appropriation. The city hired the Thomas J. Waters Company in August 1927 to complete the building, and work finally resumed that October. The Waters Company demolished the existing Tennessee marble facade, which was expected to reduce total construction costs by $2 million. Afterward, the company planned to construct a three-story wing measuring 285 by 60 ft (87 by 18 m) across.

The Board of Estimate voted in November 1928 to authorize the issuance of up to $1.25 million in stock for the Central Library's completion, and Brooklyn officials began soliciting bids for the building's completion. City officials agreed in July 1929 to demolish a water tower in Mount Prospect Park, which abutted a portion of the building's foundation that had to be rebuilt, but the water tower was not razed until six months later. By the end of 1929, city engineer William P. Hennessy was preparing plans for the construction of the building's Eastern Parkway wing, rear wing, and central portion. A groundbreaking ceremony for these three sections occurred on January 6, 1930. Contractors were obligated to complete the foundations for these three structures within 250 days. By early 1931, Brooklyn borough president Henry Hesterberg was requesting another $9 million or $9.5 million from the Board of Estimate. Although the board had previously been reluctant to give the Central Library such a large appropriation, Hesterberg said the city could reduce the total construction cost by funding the entirety of the project at once.

Work stalled once again in 1931, after the foundations were finished. On rainy days, the foundations of the Eastern Parkway wing were inundated, and local children often played with model boats there; at one point, a boy reportedly drowned in the foundations. By 1932, the BPL's directors were calling the Central Library "a monument to municipal procrastination". The site was also referred to as the "Pigeon Palace", the "Pigeon Roost", the "Roman Ruins of Brooklyn", and a "hideous old wreck". The system's circulation had more than doubled compared to 1912, when the Central Library's construction had started, while the number of patrons had nearly doubled. Hesterberg requested in early 1932 that the city pay Almirall $258,000 in architect's fees. At the same time, the city's board of aldermen notified the BPL that the city government did not have enough funding to cover the Central Library's full cost. The BPL unsuccessfully attempted to obtain funding for the library in 1931 and 1933.

== Current library ==
In late 1933, local businessmen asked the city government to request a $9 million (equivalent to $223.8 million in 2025) loan from the Public Works Administration (PWA). After more than a year, the city voted in April 1935 to request $5 million (equivalent to $117.4 million in 2025) from the PWA. Brooklyn borough president Raymond Ingersoll announced the next month that Alfred Morton Githens and Francis Keally had redesigned the building; most of the main public rooms were relocated to the ground story, while offices and backroom operations were relocated to the upper stories. Ingersoll promised that September to finish the Central Library. Mayor Fiorello La Guardia officially requested the funding from the PWA the same month, but the PWA had still not approved the loan by the end of that year. Githens and Keally completed their preliminary designs in February 1936. The original Beaux-Arts design was completely scrapped in favor of an Art Deco design, and the building was redesigned with a fan-shaped plan.

=== Redesign and completion ===
Local leaders formed a committee in February 1936 to advocate for the building's completion. Supporters of the Central Library said the BPL's existing central library was suitable for a city with 50,000 residents, two percent of Brooklyn's population at the time. Between April and June 1936, about 200,000 people signed a petition asking PWA secretary Harold L. Ickes to approve money for the building. By then, Ingersoll described the Central Library as the highest-priority "needed improvement" in Brooklyn. Parks commissioner Robert Moses drew up revised plans for the Central Library, La Guardia sent these plans to the BPL in August 1936. Ingersoll requested $2 million from the Board of Estimate in January 1937. and the board approved the funding two months later. The board also approved $20,000 for a modification of the plans that May; it would approve the remaining funds once the plans had been revised. Draftsmen quickly began revising the plans, and the Board of Estimate appropriated $1.883 million for the project that November.

Ingersoll began soliciting bids for the Central Library's construction in December 1937. Shortly thereafter, the Cauldwell–Wingate Company received the $1.3 million general contract for the project, and four other companies were awarded contracts for mechanical work. Work began on February 14, 1938, with the demolition of the existing fourth story and removal of the original decorations. To save money, the existing frame was retained. The Board of Estimate approved $30,000 for sculptures on the Central Library in April 1938, and Thomas Hudson Jones and C. Paul Jennewein were hired to design the sculptures, which the Municipal Art Commission approved the same year. In June 1938, the PWA authorized $2.5 million for the Central Library; only the first story was to be fitted out initially. The building was nearly completed in August 1939, several months ahead of schedule, but the city had not appropriated funding for salaries. The city issued $200,000 in bonds that August to fund further construction, and the Board of Estimate provided another $101,000 two months later for equipment.

La Guardia toured the Central Library in December 1939, by which time administrative staff had begun moving into the third floor. Because the second floor had not been furnished, the BPL's extension department was forced to work in the building's garage. The BPL began moving books into the Central Branch in early 1940, and the Central Library had 360,000 books in its stacks by that October. That month, BPL chief librarian Milton J. Ferguson requested another $300,000 to complete the second floor, and the Board of Estimate agreed to provide $500,000 shortly afterward. The BPL also announced plans to spend $1,500 on inscribed capstones memorializing Ingersoll, who had died the same year. Upon its opening, the building had 170 employees, excluding WPA workers, and it contained 460,000 books in its collection.

=== Opening, 1940s, and 1950s ===
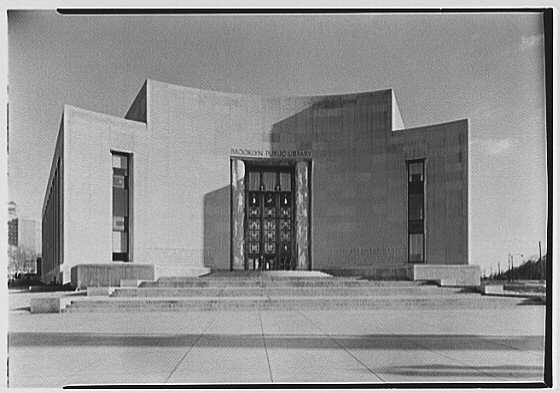
View of the library when it opened

The Central Library opened for public previews on February 1, 1941, as the Ingersoll Memorial Library; the library building opened for limited service two days later. It was the first permanent library building to be opened in Brooklyn in nearly two decades. (Note: According to The Brooklyn Daily Eagle, the Central Library was the only library in Brooklyn to open in the 25 years after the borough's last Carnegie library was built. The last Carnegie library, the Washington Irving Library, opened in 1923.) Because the basement and second story were largely unfinished, some of the offices were housed within the reading room and within a completed portion of the second story. Within two weeks of the building's opening, so many patrons had borrowed books that the BPL limited the number of books that cardholders could borrow; furthermore, the building could only operate for four to seven hours per day due to staff shortages. The Central Library was formally dedicated on March 29, 1941, and the Ingersoll memorial capstones were dedicated in September 1941. The children's library and three departments of the Central Library opened at the beginning of October 1941. By then, the library building was handling 400,000 volumes, prompting Ferguson to ask for money to expand the stacks.

The opening of the Central Library meant that the BPL no longer had to rent space for its administrative offices. Consequently, when the building was completed, about two-thirds of the interior was used for administrative purposes. With the Central Library's opening, the BPL could also take many of its books out of storage. By the beginning of 1942, the Central Library was operating eleven hours a day on weekdays. The Central Library opened a "consumers' corner" with books about consumption of goods in early 1942, and it began lending phonograph records to BPL cardholders the same year. In October 1942, the BPL formally dedicated the bas-reliefs that Jennewein had carved into the main entrance's columns.

By late 1946, BPL officials believed that the building's second floor needed to be completed to accommodate the borough's growing population. At the time, the second floor did not have any flooring, lighting, or radiators, and there was exposed wiring. The BPL's trustees asked the City Planning Commission in 1948 for $1.385 million to complete the second floor; of this, $385,000 would come from the city's 1949 and 1950 budgets. The still-incomplete second floor was used for an exhibit in 1951. New York City public works commissioner Frederick H. Zurmuhlen requested in April 1952 that the Board of Estimate approve $900,000 for the fitting-out of the Central Library's second floor. By then, the Central Library had a total annual circulation of 1.021 million, about one-seventh of the BPL system's total circulation. The New York Times wrote that library patrons often stood in the main circulating room, while the second floor was being used as storage space.

The Board of Estimate appropriated $900,000 for the second floor in August 1952, at which point increasing material costs had caused the project's price to rise to $1.125 million. Three of the ground-story reading rooms would be relocated to the second story. The building's basement would contain new workshop space, and a pneumatic tube system would be installed throughout the building. The project would increase the Central Library's usable space from 60,224 to 102,000 square feet (5,595.0 to 9,476.1 m^{2}). The New York City Department of Public Works began soliciting bids for three construction contracts in September 1952, and the city awarded $1 million in contracts for the project at the end of that year. Work on the Central Library was delayed by a strike in mid-1953, but the second story was completed in 1955. The BPL installed a flagpole outside the Eastern Parkway wing of the building in 1959.

=== 1960s and 1970s ===
In 1960, the BPL's chief librarian Francis R. St. John requested money to rehabilitate the Central Library, but the Board of Estimate was willing to provide only $30,000 out of the requested $2.5 million. St. John asked the city for another $115,000 in 1961, though he said the next year that the project would cost $3.235 million. The first and second floors were extended to the rear in 1964, concealing the rear facade. After mayor Robert F. Wagner Jr. approved $2.891 million in funding for the building's expansion in April 1965, the BPL hired Keally and Frederick G. Frost Jr. & Associates to design an annex to the building. Brooklyn borough president Abe Stark announced the same year that floodlights would be installed on the Central Library's facade. The BPL planned a two-story annex with a garage and a service room for adults, as well as several new rooms and a set of escalators in the existing building. The new spaces would include a phone-reference room and a book processing department on the first floor; a reading room, microfilm area, and research cubicles on the second floor; and remodeled offices and a larger cafeteria on the third floor. The BPL was still awaiting final approval for the renovation by 1967.

A renovation of the Central Branch began in August 1969. The project lasted several years, with the building remaining open throughout. The Central Library's biography/history/travel and language/literature departments were moved to another part of the building in February 1971, after part of the second floor had been renovated, and the art/music and audiovisual divisions were moved that October. The lobby's floor was replaced later the same year. The renovation was completed in July 1973 when several spaces opened on the first floor. These included an expanded periodicals wing in the rear; a language and literature wing on Flatbush Avenue; the Ingersoll Room, which had an extensive paperback collection; and the children's library on Eastern Parkway. The renovation allowed the BPL to begin circulating books that had previously been stored in the building's stacks. The city government approved funding for further repairs to the Central Library in 1974.

=== 1980s and 1990s ===
The BPL began raising money for more improvements to the Central Library in 1982, and the library system announced in 1983 that it would install security cameras throughout the building. Five computer terminals opened at the Central Library in 1987, allowing visitors to access a catalog shared by the BPL, NYPL, and Queens Library. The BPL built two stories of administrative offices above the Central Library's garage in the early 1990s. The Central Library had always operated on weekdays during its first half-century, but budget cuts forced the BPL to close the building on Mondays in 1991. By then, the library operated an adult literacy program and an education and career center, and it presented film screenings and book readings to patrons. According to BPL director Larry Brandwein, the budget cuts had also forced him to eliminate several popular programs at the Central Library, such as a "term paper clinic" and a "homework hotline". The main entrance screen was cleaned in 1993. The same year, a garden themed to Alice's Adventures in Wonderland was added outside the children's library entrance.

BPL officials announced in early 1996 that they would add computers with internet access to the Central Library; at the time, no BPL branches had internet, but the NYPL and Queens Library both offered that service. After the computers were installed in October 1996, there was extremely high demand for the computers. A 2,300-square-foot (210 m^{2}) "multilingual center", with books in several languages, opened at the Central Library in October 1997. The same year, the card catalogs in the lobby were removed. By the late 1990s, local youths frequented the Central Library because of the lack of after-school activities at local schools; this led The New York Times to describe the Central Library as a "de facto day-care center". The children's library, in particular, was frequently overcrowded because of the lack of a courtyard and because the computers in the room were extremely popular.

The children's library was expanded starting in July 1999, and it reopened in mid-2000 as the 10,500-square-foot (980 m^{2}) Youth Wing. The renovation, designed by Pasanella, Klein, Stolzman and Berg, cost $2.5 million. The room's dropped ceiling was removed, allowing the restoration of the original windows; in addition, about 40 computers were installed in the Youth Wing, A technology loft was built on the mezzanine. The wing's main room was named for Yetta and Louis Schwartz, whose daughter had donated $1 million to the BPL.

=== 2000s to present ===
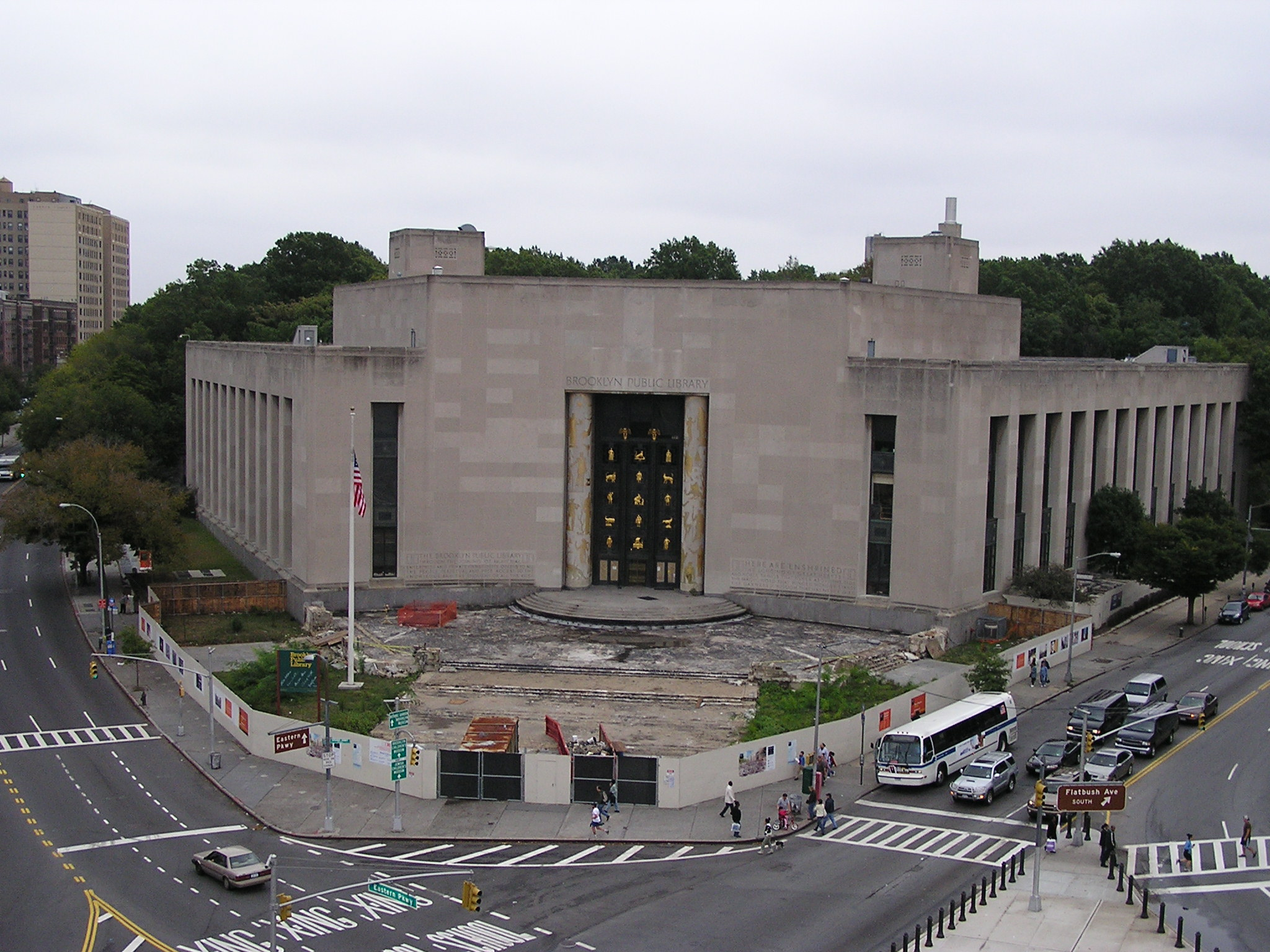
Reconstruction of the Grand Army Plaza terrace entrance in 2005

By the early 21st century, most of the building's administrative functions had been moved to Queens. The BPL announced in 2004 that it would spend $16 million rebuilding its main terrace to designs by Vincent Benic. The BPL also wished to build a 200-seat auditorium underneath the terrace; the auditorium had been part of Almirall's original design but had never been constructed because of a lack of money. By 2005, more than $14 million had been raised for the terrace and auditorium. During the renovation, labor unions complained that the BPL was hiring non-union contractors. The second floor was renovated in 2006, at which point the Brooklyn Collection's reading room opened. The auditorium, which was supposed to be completed in mid-2007, opened that October and was named for S. Stevan Dweck, a doctor who donated $1.5 million. The BPL raised $100,000 for further improvements to the Central Library during 2009.

The Central Library's Passport Service Center opened in May 2011, making it the first library branch in New York City to issue passports; over the next two years, the center processed applications for 21,000 passports. After philanthropist Shelby White donated $3.25 million to the Central Library in 2010, the BPL announced that it would create a research center named after White and her late husband Leon Levy. The Shelby White and Leon Levy Information Commons opened in January 2013 following a renovation designed by Toshiko Mori. The Info Commons was frequented by patrons who used the space for meetings, research, and even a wedding. The BPL opened an enrollment office for IDNYC cards at the Central Library in 2015. By the mid-2010s, the Central Library was often filled to capacity, and the structure was in poor condition. The New York Daily News estimated that the BPL needed to spend $67.7 million to renovate the Central Library and replace its fire alarms, air conditioning, roofs, windows, elevators, and bathrooms.

The BPL announced in 2018 that it would spend $135 million renovating the Central Library in four phases. It rehired Mori to renovate the building. The library was temporarily closed from March 2020 to May 2021 during the COVID-19 pandemic in New York City. The first phase of the renovation, costing $38 million, was completed in May 2021 and involved adding a book gallery, expanding various rooms, updating the bathrooms and elevators, and redecorating the interior. The second part of the renovation commenced in 2024; the project was expected to be completed in 2027, and the building would remain open during construction. The second phase involved expanding the adult learning center, adding a room for teenagers, renovating book collection spaces, and overhauling the HVAC system. The BPL also planned to build a footbridge to Mount Prospect Park and rearranging storage spaces in the basement.

== Architecture ==
The original library was designed in the Beaux-Arts style by Raymond F. Almirall. Much of Almirall's original design, consisting of a central pavilion on Grand Army Plaza flanked by wings on Eastern Parkway and Flatbush Avenue, was never built. Had the structure been fully constructed, it would have contained two basements and four above-ground stories. The current Brooklyn Central Library was designed by Alfred Morton Githens and Francis Keally in the Art Deco style, with decorations by Thomas Hudson Jones and C. Paul Jennewein. Githens and Keally's design is a three-story limestone structure, with a pair of wings flanking the entry terrace on Grand Army Plaza. The building also has some Art Moderne decorative elements, such as the terrazzo floors and wood wainscots in the lobby.

=== Form and facade ===
In general, the facade is made of Indiana limestone, except below the first story, where the facade is made of gray granite. According to the National Park Service, the Central Library's shape resembles an open book as viewed from the air. The modern facade contains relatively little ornamentation, except around the main entrance on Grand Army Plaza, which is decorated with literary motifs. There is another entrance to the Civic Commons section of the building on Flatbush Avenue. The eastern part of the site is higher than the western portion; as such, the main entrance is raised from the ground, while the eastern part of the library building is almost precisely at ground level. The Central Library has retained most of its 1930s design over the years.

==== Main entrance ====
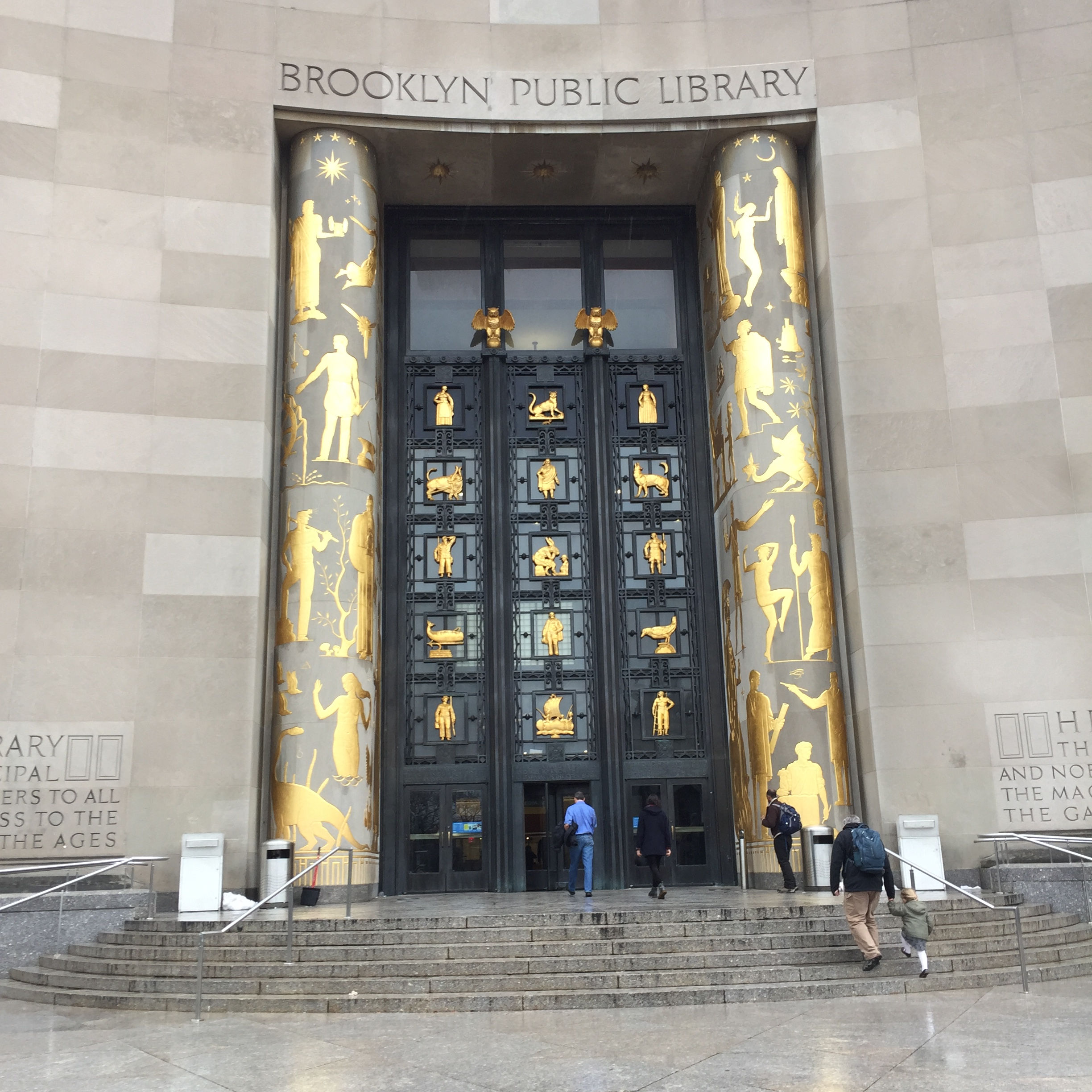
Detail of the entrance. The columns contain gilded bas-reliefs by C. P. Jennewein, and the screen contains 15 panels by Thomas H. Jones.

At the northwest corner of the Central Library is a main entrance pavilion with a curving facade on Grand Army Plaza; the curved facade alludes to the plaza's elliptical shape. Three stairways from the north, northwest, and southwest ascend to a terrace just outside the main entrance. Between each stairway is a small planting bed with metal fences. The northern edge of the terrace contains a flagpole. Each stairway has wrought-iron railings and granite side walls. The center staircase (facing northwest) is divided into four short flights and is flanked by a pair of lighting fixtures with three lamps. There are granite capstones below the lamps, each of which has inscriptions from Raymond Ingersoll, the borough president of Brooklyn when the building was erected. Early plans for the plaza called for a map of Brooklyn to be carved within the pavement. Another set of stairs leads up from the terrace to a brick landing, which in turn leads to the actual entrance.

The main entrance facade is four stories high, flanked by side sections measuring three stories high. The roof of the facade's central section is 80 ft (24 m) tall and is topped by a pair of cubic staircase enclosures, which are set back from the rest of the facade. The three-story-high sections on either side of the main entrance contain recessed windows. Between the windows on different stories are dark-green spandrel panels which are described as being made of Virginia alvarene stone. The windows are divided into four panes at the first story, while the second- and third-floor windows each feature one pane. The walls on either side of the central entrance contain inscriptions by Roscoe Conkling Ensign Brown, the BPL's president during the late 1930s.

At the center of the facade is a rectangular doorway flanked by 50-foot-tall (15 m) columns. On the columns are gilded bas-reliefs designed by Jennewein, which depict both classical and contemporary figures. These columns support an entablature above the doorway with the inscribed name "Brooklyn Public Library" in all caps. At ground level is a revolving door flanked by double doors on either side; all of these doors are made of bronze. Above each of these doors is an inscription by Brown. The inscriptions, in turn, are topped by a 40-foot-tall (12 m) bronze screen designed by Jones. The screen is split into 15 square panels, each of which is gilded and depicts a figure from American literature or folklore. The panels on the left depict the sciences, while those on the right depict the arts. At the third story, the grille contains a pair of gilded owls, each of which is perched on a globe lamp with an elaborate base. Three lighting fixtures are recessed within the soffit at the top of the doorway.

==== Wings ====
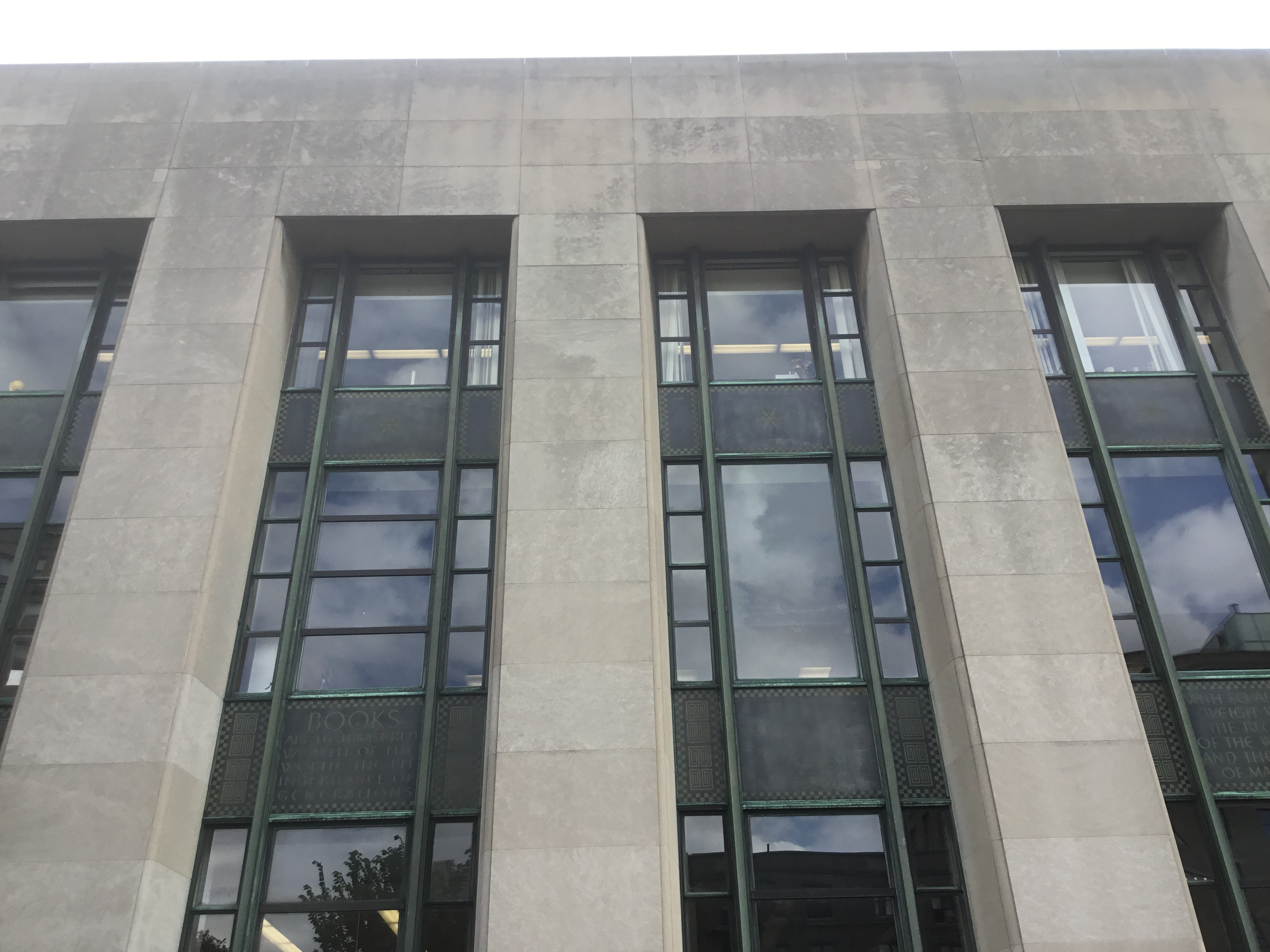
Windows on side facades

Both wings are designed in a modern classical style; the Flatbush Avenue wing was built as part of Almirall's original design but was re-clad during the 1930s. The Flatbush Avenue wing extends southeast and is longer than the Eastern Parkway wing, which extends east. Both wings are recessed from the sidewalk and contain planted lawns in front of them, with ventilation grates on the lawn facing Eastern Parkway. Each facade contains three-story-high bays of recessed windows; there are 11 bays facing Eastern Parkway and 13 bays on Flatbush Avenue. Within each bay, the windows on each story are divided vertically into a large central portion flanked by narrower panes on either side. There are dark-green spandrels above the first- and second-story windows, each of which contain classical motifs, quotes, star shapes, and borders with checkerboard patterns.

Immediately adjacent to the curved main entrance facade, the Flatbush Avenue elevation of the facade contains a cornerstone with the inscription 1938. There is a stairway immediately to the right, descending to a service entrance with two bronze doors. The southern end of the Flatbush Avenue wing contains a three-story annex, which curves northward to the parking lot at the rear of the building. The first story of this annex is clad in limestone and dates to the building's reconstruction in 1940. The upper two stories are clad in concrete and were built in 1990. There are literary motifs and classical decorations on the upper two stories, as well as single-pane windows. The eastern elevation of the Flatbush Avenue annex contains a service entrance.

On Eastern Parkway, adjacent to the main entrance, a ramp leads to a staff entrance to the basement. The staff entrance contains bronze doors similar to those on Flatbush Avenue. A secondary, wheelchair-accessible public entrance is at the eastern end of the Eastern Parkway wing. The easternmost Eastern Parkway entrance, which leads to the children's library, was built because it was close to the New York City Subway's Eastern Parkway–Brooklyn Museum station. The children's library entrance is accessed through a black metal gate with the words "Children's Library" inscribed above it, as well as motifs of squirrels designed by Jones. Behind the gate is a small garden, as well as a doorway with green stone letters reading "Children's Library". The doorway is topped by a set of windows, which is divided vertically into three sections like the other windows on the facade. There is another set of iron gates to the south, behind which the building's eastern elevation is visible. To the east of the library building is a retaining wall and a fence, behind which is Mount Prospect Park.

=== Interior ===
Occupying over 350,000 square feet (33,000 m^{2}) and employing 300 full-time staff members, the building serves as the administrative headquarters for the Brooklyn Public Library system. The building was intended to seat 3,000 patrons at once, and it could fit about one million or two million books in its stacks. The reading rooms were placed along the perimeter of the building, and reflectors and concealed lighting was scattered throughout the building. According to the New York Herald Tribune, the window arrangement was "planned for easy reading and avoidance of eye strain". In addition, the Central Library was planned with illuminated guides to allow guests to more easily identify books. The interior spaces were largely plain and rectangular, except for the entry foyer and circulation room.

By the early 21st century, the spaces beneath the first- and second-story windows had bookshelves, while the spaces below the third-story windows had radiators. Following a renovation in 2021, the building's interior was redecorated in a style approximating the original design, with light terrazzo floors, blond oak, and metal accents.

==== Lower levels ====
Originally, there were four tiers of stacks in the basement, which had a capacity of 350,000 or 450,000 volumes. The basement also contains emergency exits to Flatbush Avenue and Eastern Parkway. In the basement (designated as the lower level), near the corner of Flatbush Avenue and Eastern Parkway, is the Dr. S. Stevan Dweck Cultural Center, a 189-seat auditorium that opened in 2007. The auditorium contains two lobbies and two conference rooms. Adjacent to this auditorium is the Reverend Elsie Smith Conference Room. These are accessed from the Brooklyn Community Foundation Lobby at the rear of the basement.

==== First story ====
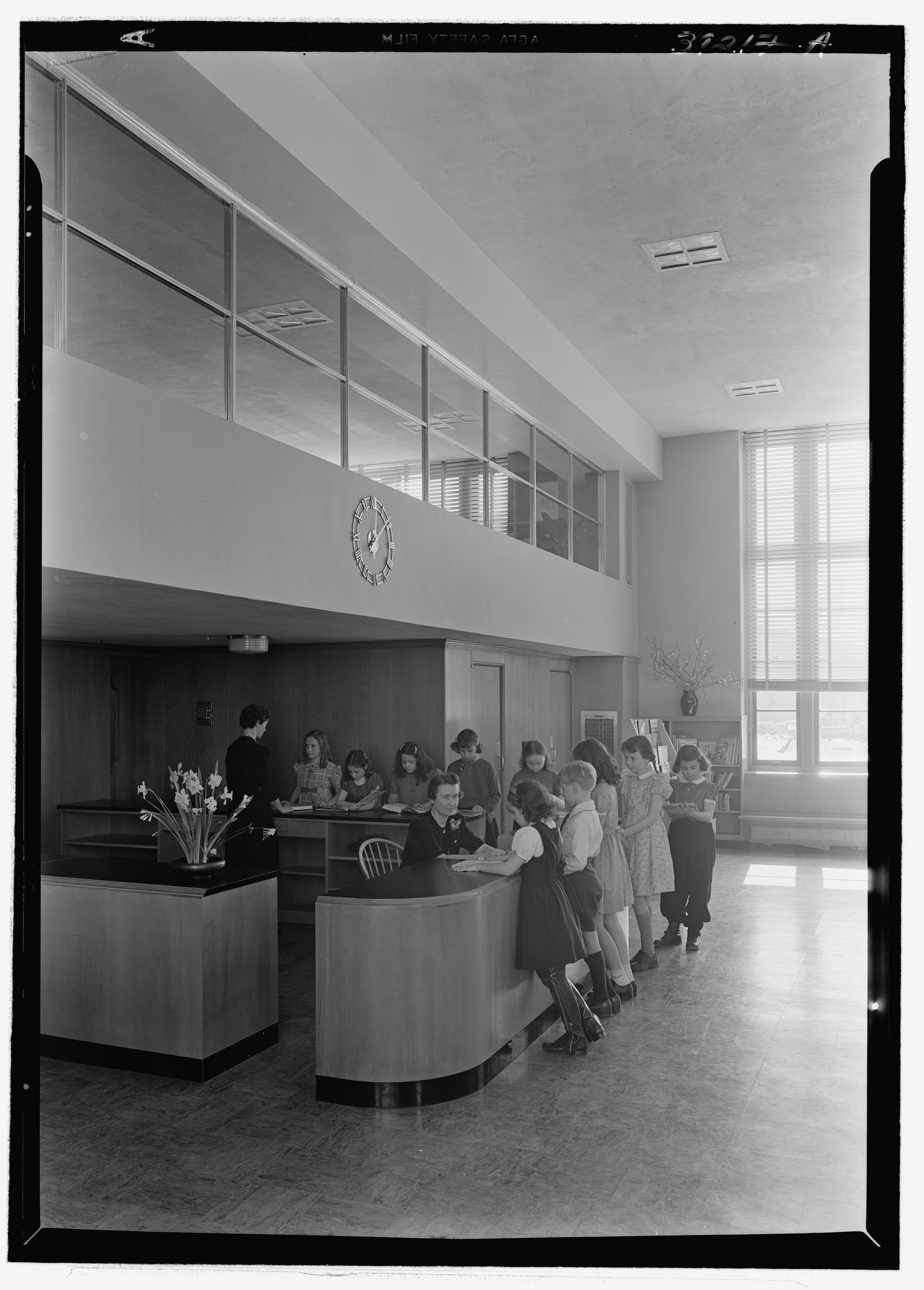
Original interior of the library

As built, the ground story (designated as the first floor) (Note: The current design dates to Githens and Keally's plan, where the ground story is labeled as the first floor. In Almirall's unbuilt plan, the first floor was the story directly above the ground level.) was intended to contain the building's primary spaces, including the general circulation room and a children's library. The main entrance leads to a central foyer. This foyer originally had wood wainscoting, as well as green walls and a blue ceiling, intended to encourage patrons to enter the circulation room. The modern foyer is a symmetrical U-shaped space with oak display cases; the ceiling is decorated in a simple style, with curving lines. There are rooms leading off the side walls of the foyer, which contain a photocopy room and security office. On either side of the foyer, a pair of marble stairs and an escalator lead up to the second floor. A passage with wood paneling leads straight to the circulation room; the walls of this passage contain plaques dedicated to individuals who were involved in the building's construction. The foyer contains an Art Deco mural by John von Wicht, which was commissioned for radio station WNYC.

The circulation room itself is three stories high, covering 3,250 ft^{2} (302 m^{2}). As originally arranged, the room was to be surrounded by small niches separated by bookcases, increasing the first floor's flexibility. The circulating desks were in the middle of the room, surrounded by catalog desks. Plaster and wood was used throughout the circulation room; this design was largely retained through the 21st century. The rear wall contains a counter. Hallways with oak paneling lead off each end of the circulating room; the entrances to these hallways are flanked by fluted pilasters, and there is a clock above the portal to each hallway. Catalog cases were placed on the rear wall of the circulation room until their removal in the 1990s. Within the main lobby is the Major Owens Welcome Center, named after former U.S. Congressman Major Owens who worked as a BPL librarian early in his career.

The Eastern Parkway wing was a children's library from the outset. A parents' balcony overlooked the space, and a set of bookcases separated the children's library from a "senior reading room". As of 2023, the Eastern Parkway side still contains the Youth Wing, accessed from the eastern entrance on Eastern Parkway. The Flatbush Avenue wing of the first floor originally contained a reading room measuring 180 by 40 ft (55 by 12 m). The Flatbush Avenue wing contains the language and literature collection as of 2023. The Central Library's Civic Commons is a 10,000-foot (3,000 m) space accessible from the Flatbush Avenue annex; it contains offices for passport applications. IDNYC identification cards, and community groups, as well as a computer lab. Adjacent to the circulating room is a 1,190-foot (360 m) gallery for "new and noteworthy" books, which opened in 2021 and contains a metal sculpture on its ceiling.

Originally, there was a reading room for "popular books" just behind the circulating room. The rear of the first floor originally contained a reading room adjacent to a small garden. After the room was enlarged in the 1960s, it became a periodicals and micromaterials department, with a staircase ascending to the second story. The rooms in the rear were then converted into the Shelby White and Leon Levy Information Commons, which opened in January 2013. The Info Commons spans 5,500 ft^{2} (510 m^{2}) and was largely inspired by the design of Apple Stores, as well as that of the Bobst Library research center on the campus of New York University. It contains a recording studio, a classroom for remote learning, seven meeting rooms, 25 desktop computers, and seating for patrons with laptops.

==== Second story ====
The second story contains a curving balcony at its eastern or rear end. The stairs and escalators from the first-floor foyer lead to landings at the northern and southwestern ends of the balcony. There is a metal railing at the front of the balcony, as well as doorways to various rooms, with display cases between each doorway. This balcony was originally illuminated by a wall of 1,000 glass blocks. Set within this glass-block wall are four curved pillars, each made of opaque glass. The reading rooms on the rear, or southeast, end of the second floor date from 1956.

As of 2023, the Eastern Parkway wing of the second floor contains the Business and Career Center, as well as history, religion, and biography collections. The Business and Career Center contains an open plan workspace with numerous wooden chairs and tables, along with two seminar rooms, four meeting rooms, and seven niches for conversation. The Flatbush Avenue wing contains the sciences, society, and technology collections. The popular library, balcony conference room, and adult learning center are located in the rear of the building between the two wings.

==== Third and fourth stories ====
The top two floors were intended as administrative offices and an employee cafeteria. The third floor is accessed by stairs and an elevator from the second-story balcony's southwestern end. At this level, a balcony with full-height glass walls crosses above the northwestern corner of the building, serving as a clerestory. On the opposite side of the third story, between the Flatbush Avenue and Eastern Parkway wings, is a trustees' room with oak paneling. Next to it were a staff room and a librarian's office, connected to the trustees' room by a glass-enclosed passage. The rooms' wood wainscoting and plaster ceilings and walls contrasted with their glass-and-chromium windows, creating a modern design. As of 2023, the Flatbush Avenue wing of the third story contains a computer room and art and music collections, in addition to the trustees' room. The rest of the third story contains administrative offices.

The fourth story was planned to contain a staff dining room and lounge, as well as various other rooms and a portion of the upper stacks. The upper two stories could be accessed by five elevators.

=== Almirall's unbuilt design ===
Almirall had originally planned the building as the focal point of Grand Army Plaza, surpassing the Soldiers' and Sailors' Arch in prominence. The structure would have required a quadrilateral site measuring 70 ft (21 m) along Grand Army Plaza to the west, 498 ft (152 m) along Flatbush Avenue to the southwest, 486 ft (148 m) to the east, and 332 ft (101 m) along Eastern Parkway to the north. According to the Brooklyn Times Union, the site's unusual shape allowed for "freer handling of the detail" on the facade. Although the entire site covered 100,000 ft^{2} (9,300 m^{2}), there were to be six light courts with a combined area of 13,000 ft^{2} (1,200 m^{2}). The facade would have been made mostly of limestone, with a granite base. The central pavilion would have had curved corners and three openings. There would have been several 69-foot-high (21 m) Doric columns on the central pavilion, while the side elevations would have contained Doric columns. There would have been a grand dome above the structure, measuring 150 ft (46 m) high.

The interior of the building would have had a total floor area of 270,000 ft^{2} (25,000 m^{2}). The longer Flatbush Avenue wing would have had the public rooms, while the shorter Eastern Parkway wing would have been used as offices. Each wing would have contained a central hall on each floor, with study rooms, reference rooms, and offices leading off either side. The front of each wing would have been devoted to public-facing rooms. Stacks would have been placed at the rear of each wing, facing Underhill Avenue; they would have been illuminated by apertures on the facade. The building would have contained a steel superstructure. The structure was originally planned with space for 1.5 million books, which was later increased to 2.5 million; by 1927, the building was planned to house 3.15 million books. Almirall decided upon the dimensions of the building's rooms after touring other libraries.

From Grand Army Plaza would have been a large lobby and a wide stairway leading to the second story. The sub-basement would have contained the building's mechanical systems, while the basement story would have contained the heating plant, printing plant, storage rooms, a janitor's room, and a women's sitting room. There was also to be an auditorium in the basement. The ground, first, and second floors would have contained various departments. A mezzanine above the second story would have had staff rooms and dining rooms. Other stories would have contained special departments, rare books, study rooms, and club rooms.

== Collections ==
The Brooklyn Central Library contains over 1.7 million materials in its collection. Among the original objects in the Central Library's collection was a copy of a French Imperial Old Testament, one of twenty known to exist. The original collection also included thousands of records by the federal government of the United States, as well as 20,000 letters, newspaper clippings, and other objects relating to World War I history.

Historically, the Central Library housed the BPL's Brooklyn collection. The collection contained media relating to Brooklyn's history, including photos, books, and a full archive of the Brooklyn Daily Eagle. After the Brooklyn Historical Society (BHS) merged with the BPL in 2020 to form the Center for Brooklyn History, the Brooklyn collection was relocated to the BHS's building in Brooklyn Heights.

== Events ==
The Brooklyn Central Library has hosted numerous events throughout its existence and is visited by over 1.3 million people per year as of 2021. In its early years, the Central Library's exhibits included a showcase of books written by children and an exhibit of foreign-born Americans' inventions. By the 2000s, the building was hosting several art exhibits per year.

Modern events at the building have included Night in the Library, a performance and party that has been hosted since 2017. The People's Ball, an annual fashion show, was first held in 2018. The New York Times and Time Out magazine have characterized the People's Ball as a free version of the Met Gala. In addition, as part of the Cinema Ephemera program, the BPL sometimes displays videos, films, images, and slideshows are sometimes displayed on the Central Library's main entrance facade at night. The Dweck Center in the Central Branch's basement has also hosted events such as fundraisers and parties since it opened in 2007. As of 2011, the Dweck Center hosted over 100 events monthly, including many for children.

== Critical reception ==
=== Almirall's design ===
When construction on Almirall's original building began in 1912, Building Age magazine wrote: "The new structure will be as complete in details of construction and convenience as it is possible to make it." By 1933, the BPL saw the never-completed original design as obsolete. Brooklyn's chief librarian Milton J. Ferguson said at the time: "The result of all the elaborate art of the building will be dark reading rooms, book shelves hard to reach, anything but what a modern library should be." Christopher Gray wrote for The New York Times in 2004 that Almirall's design had been "a superrich version of Grand Central Terminal's Beaux-Arts sundae but with hot fudge, whipped cream and a cherry."

=== Current structure ===
After Githens and Keally's design was announced, Milton J. Ferguson said that, when the structure was completed, "it should serve as a model for the entire country". When the building opened, The Brooklyn Citizen wrote: "The new library to all appearances seems to be a structure of great utilitarian value and architectural beauty". Although architectural critic Lewis Mumford regarded the stacks as mediocre, he thought the main lobby area was "unexpectedly exhilarating" and "the most vital point of the whole design".

The BPL's chief librarian during the 1950s, Francis R. St. John, described the Central Library as "the best example of library architecture in America". Although Christopher Gray of The New York Times wrote in 2004 that the building was an "impressive, Moderne-style, wedge-shaped structure", he said its "impressive site is in fact one of its biggest disadvantages" because of the high amounts of traffic on Grand Army Plaza. The New York Times wrote in 2018: "The Art Deco-ish front entrance recalls the spine, the two huge wings the front and back covers." In the 1987 book New York 1930, Robert A. M. Stern and his co-authors wrote that the building's interior spaces were "proof positive that Modernism and monumentality were not mutually exclusive".

In 1996, Stern listed the Brooklyn Central Library in his article "A Preservationist's List of 35 Modern Landmarks-in-Waiting". The New York City Landmarks Preservation Commission designated the Central Library as a New York City landmark in June 1997, and the Central Library was listed on the National Register of Historic Places in 2002.

== See also ==
- Brooklyn Visual Heritage
- List of New York City Designated Landmarks in Brooklyn
- National Register of Historic Places listings in Brooklyn
