= Francis R. St. John =

American librarian

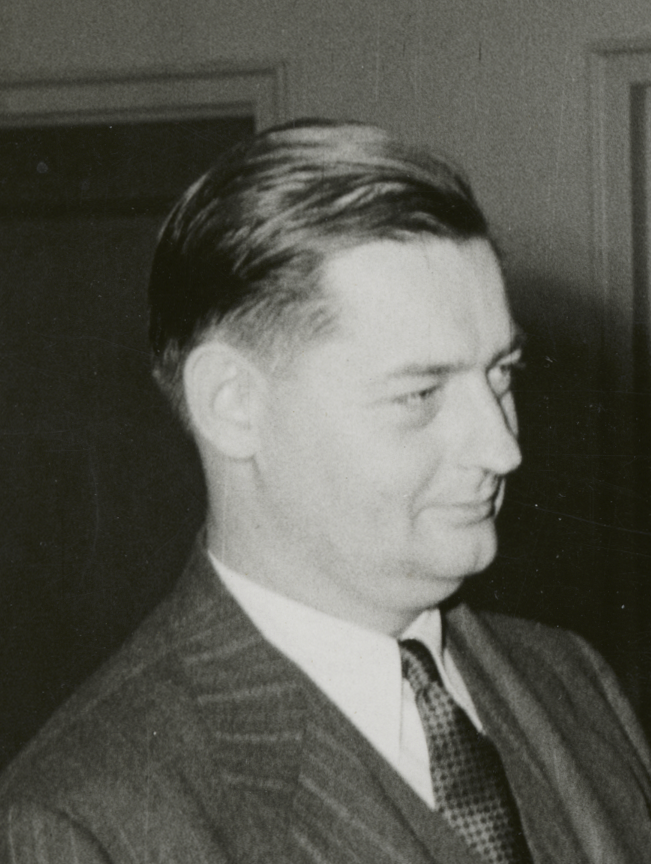
- Born: June 16, 1908; Northampton
- Died: July 19, 1971 (aged 63); Manchester
- Occupation: Librarian

Francis Regis St. John (June 16, 1908 – July 19, 1971) was an American librarian and director of the Brooklyn Public Library from 1949 to 1963. In 1999, American Libraries named him one of the "100 Most Important Leaders We Had in the 20th Century".

St. John was born in Northampton, Massachusetts. He attended Northampton High School and worked in the Forbes Library as a page and desk assistant. He attended Amherst College, studying botany and working as a student assistant in the library. He graduated in 1931 with an AB. The next year, he graduated with a BLS from the Columbia University School of Library Service. That year he also began working for the New York Public Library, holding a number of positions. In 1939, he became assistant director under Joseph L. Wheeler at the Enoch Pratt Free Library in Baltimore, Maryland. Two years later he returned to the NYPL as head of the circulation department.

During World War II, from 1943 to 1945, St. John worked for the Army Medical Library as acting librarian and then assistant to the director. He advanced from lieutenant to captain and was awarded the Legion of Merit for reorganizing the Library. He returned again to the NYPL in 1945, before becoming Director of Library Services for the Veterans Administration in 1947.

In 1949, St. John became director of the Brooklyn Public Library, where he made his national reputation. During his tenure, circulation of materials doubled from 5 million to 10 million, the library added 17 new branches for a total of 55, and expansion of the Central Library was completed. Innovations like assembly-line book processing reduced costs, which funded expanded services like remedial reading programs. He actively recruited African-Americans for professional positions.

He retired from the Brooklyn library in 1963. From 1964 to 1967, he operated a consulting firm whose clients included numerous state and city library systems in the United States. He then became librarian at Saint Anselm College in Goffstown, New Hampshire until 1970.
