= Minoru and Teruko (Hirashiki) Yamasaki House =

Historic house in Michigan, United States

- U.S. National Register of Historic Places
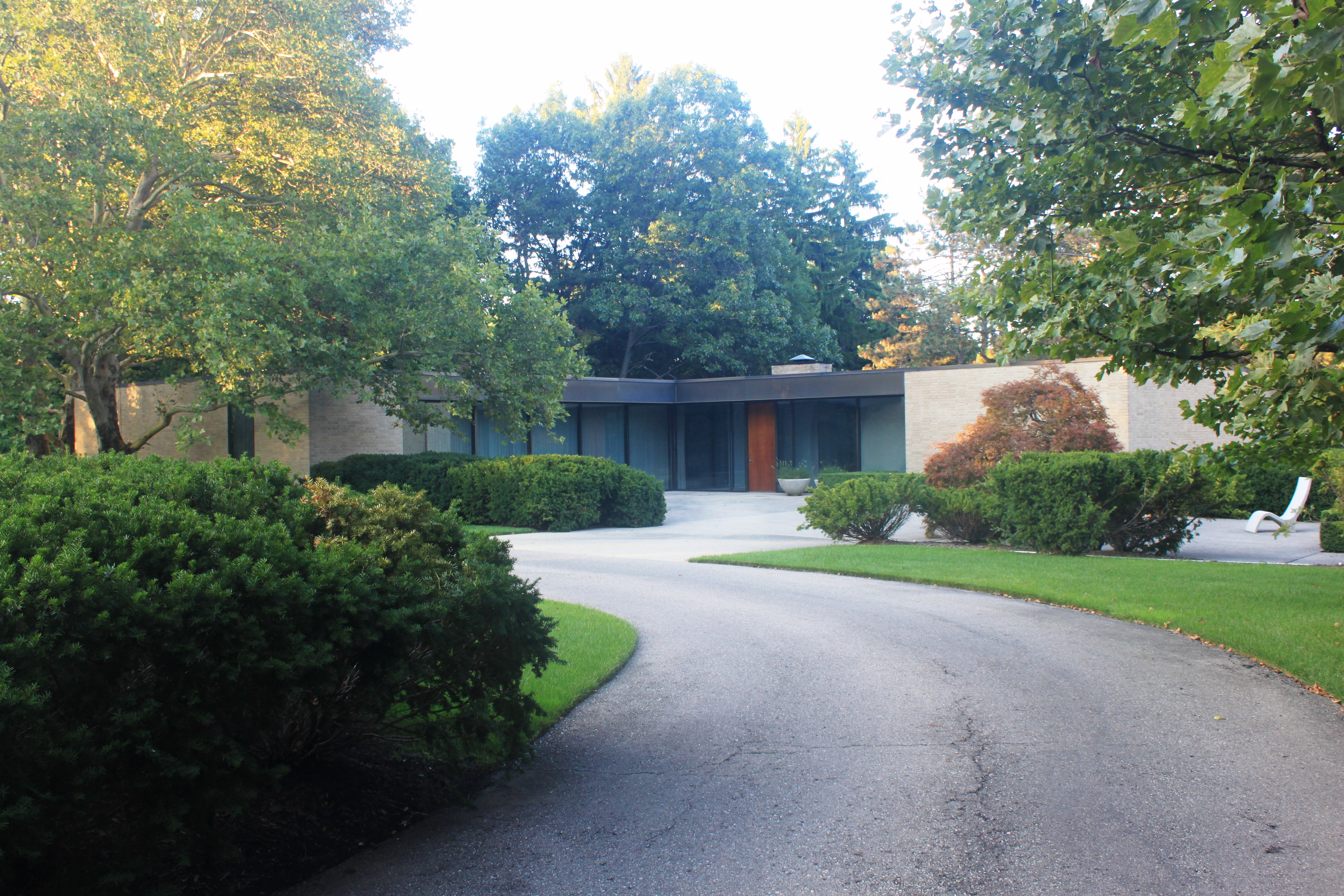
- Interactive map
- Location: 3717 Lakecrest Dr., Bloomfield Hills, Michigan
- Coordinates: 42°35′14″N 83°13′33″W
- Area: 0 acres (0 ha)
- Built: 1972
- Architect: Minoru Yamasaki
- NRHP reference No.: 13000905
- Added to NRHP: October 25, 2013

The Minoru and Teruko (Hirashiki) Yamasaki House is a private house located at 3717 Lakecrest Drive in Bloomfield Hills, Michigan. It was the home of architect Minoru Yamasaki, designed by him in 1972. The house was listed on the National Register of Historic Places in 2013.

== History ==
Minoru Yamasaki was born in Seattle in 1912, studied architecture at the University of Washington, then moved the New York City, where he took graduate courses at New York University before accepting his first architecture position with the firm of Githens and Keally in 1935. Yamasaki spent the next decade in New York with various firms, and married Teruko Hirashiki in 1941. In 1945 left for Detroit to become the new head of design for Smith, Hinchman, and Grylls. He stayed until 1949, when he left to establish his own practice.

When the Yamasakis first came to Detroit, they found it difficult to find suitable housing, due in part to a persistent anti-Japanese sentiment in Detroit's suburbs. They eventually purchased a farmhouse on Livernois Road, in Troy, Michigan, which was then very rural. By the early 1970s, however, the encroaching suburbification had reached Troy, and the Yamasakis were able to sell for a profit. By this time, they were also able to purchase land in areas from which they were previously excluded. In 1972, they purchased this lot, and Minoru Yamasaki designed the house. The house embodies Yamasaki's approach to architectural design, expressed in residential architecture. Minoru Yamasaki lived in this house until his death in 1986.

== Description ==
The Yamasaki house is a two-story, flat roofed, L-shaped structure. It is constructed on an aluminum frame and clad with bricks. The front elevation features an entry through the interior of the L. The entry is on the second level of the house. Other elevations feature tall curtain walls. A pool addition is to one side. The interior is an open floor plan and simple design, reflecting Yamasaki's philosophy that the interior of a house should recede into the background, allowing the furniture, artwork, and people to become the focal points.

== See also ==
- National Register of Historic Places listings in Oakland County, Michigan
