= Ginnie Cooper =

American librarian

Ginnie Cooper is an American librarian. She was the executive director of the Brooklyn Public Library from 2003 to 2007. She was the Chief Librarian of the District of Columbia Public Library, from 2006 to 2013. On March 20, 2013, she won the category three Thomas Jefferson Award for Public Architecture.
