= Joseph L. Wheeler =

American librarian

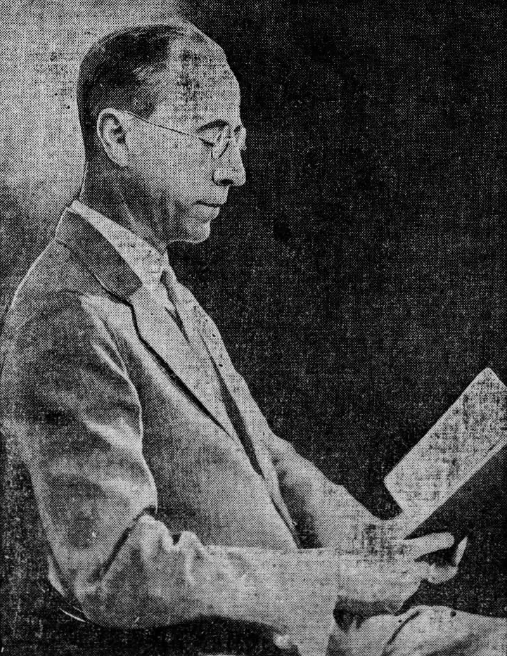
- Wheeler (c. 1927)
- Born: March 16, 1884; Dorchester
- Died: December 3, 1970 (aged 86); Rutland
- Occupation: Librarian
- Children: John Archibald Wheeler
- Parent(s): George Stevens Wheeler
- Awards: Joseph W. Lippincott Award (1961); American Library Association Honorary Membership (1964)

Joseph Lewis Wheeler (March 16, 1884 – December 3, 1970) was an American librarian.

Wheeler was an alumnus of Brown University. He served as director of the Youngstown Public Library from 1916 to 1926.

In 1917, Wheeler took a leave of absence from Youngstown Public Library to work in the Library War Service managing 32 camp libraries.

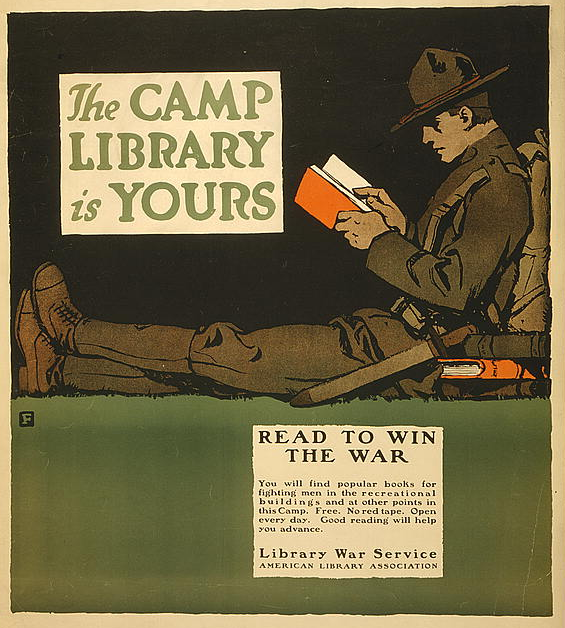
Library War Service poster by Charles Buckles Falls

He was director of the Enoch Pratt Free Library in Baltimore, Maryland from 1926 to 1945. In Baltimore, he transformed many of the library's services including increasing the library's holdings of publications related to business, science and fine arts, and placing reference books on open shelves so the public could help themselves to information.

In 1961 he was honored with the Joseph W. Lippincott Award and in 1964 Wheeler was awarded American Library Association Honorary Membership.

In 1999, Wheeler was named as one of 100 American librarians who had a lasting effect on library service and the nation.

Wheeler's son was physicist John Archibald Wheeler. He was married to Mabel Wheeler, with whom he had three other children: Joseph, Robert, and Mary.

== Publications ==
- "The Mount Independence - Hubbardton 1776 Military Road" (self-published from three articles in consecutive 1959 editions of the Vermont Historical Society scholarly periodical publication: Vermont History, 1968) co-author Mabel A. Wheeler
- "Practical Administration of Public Libraries" (Harper & Row, 1962) co-author with Herbert Goldhor
- "The effective location of public library buildings" (University of Illinois Library School, 1958)
- "Progress of Problems in Education for Librarianship" (1946)
- "The American public library building: its planning and design with special reference to its administration and service" co-author with Alfred Morton Githens (C. Scribner's Sons, 1941)
- "The library and the community; increased book service through library publicity based on community studies" (American Library Association, 1924)
- "Your job back home; a book for men leaving the service" (American Library Association, 1919)
