= Alfred Morton Githens =

American architect (1876–1973)

Alfred Morton Githens FAIA (1876–1973) was an American architect particularly known for his work designing library buildings.

== Early life and education ==
Githens was born on August 25, 1876, in Philadelphia to William H.H. Githens, a doctor, and Frances Adelle Stotesbury Githens. He attended Episcopal Boys Academy and the University of Pennsylvania. He graduated in 1896 with a B.S. in Architecture. He received a Stewardson Scholarship to study at the American Academy in Rome and then spent two years at the École des Beaux Arts in Paris.

== Career ==
Upon his return to the United States, Githens worked at McKim, Mead and White. Later, he worked with Charles C. Haight, eventually becoming a partner. After Haight died, he worked with William A. Boring and Edward L. Tilton. After Boring's retirement, he worked in partnership with Tilton as Tilton & Githens from 1917 to 1932. After Tilton's death in 1933, Githens worked in partnership with Francis Keally.

Tilton's interest in library design and work on several Carnegie libraries led Githens to take an interest in them also. He soon became widely known and consulted for his knowledge of library architecture. In 1925 he won an American Institute of Architects prize for his design of the interior of the Wilmington Public Library in Delaware.

Githens authored a section on library architecture for Collier's Encyclopedia and a 1940 article on library design for the Bulletin of the American Library Association. He also co-authored The American Public Library Building in 1941 with Dr. J. L. Wheeler, librarian of the Enoch Pratt Library in Baltimore. Mary A. Brown, director of the Mount Vernon Public Library, said of the book: "This book was then and remains in its later edition, the major textbook for library administration, which is used in library schools all over the country." The book was published for the Carnegie Foundation.

Githens taught architecture for a time at Columbia University, and was the visiting critic of design at Princeton University Graduate School of Architecture. He was also a Fellow Emeritus of the American Institute of Architects. He continued designing into his eighties.

=== Notable projects ===
- Wilmington Public Library, Wilmington, Delaware, 1923
- Currier Museum of Art, Manchester, New Hampshire, 1929
- Central Library, Enoch Pratt Free Library, Baltimore, Maryland, 1931–1933
- United States Post Office, Manchester, New Hampshire, 1932
- Springfield Museum of Fine Arts, Springfield, Massachusetts, 1933
- Girard College library, Philadelphia, Pennsylvania, 1933
- Mount Vernon Public Library (expansion), Mount Vernon, New York, 1938
- Concord Public Library, Concord, New Hampshire, 1940
- Library and Supreme Court building (consulting), Richmond, Virginia, 1940
- Peabody Library, George Peabody College for Teachers (now part of Vanderbilt University), Nashville, Tennessee, c. 1940–1941
- Central Library, Brooklyn Public Library, Brooklyn, New York, 1941
- Scarsdale Public Library (interior), Scarsdale, New York, 1951

== Personal life ==
Githens married Charlotte Sandys Foulke Sands on June 20, 1906. The couple had 3 children: Alfred, Elizabeth, and Frances. Githens died on August 21, 1973, in Laguna Beach, California. He is buried at the Bard College Cemetery in Annandale-on-Hudson, New York.

== Gallery ==
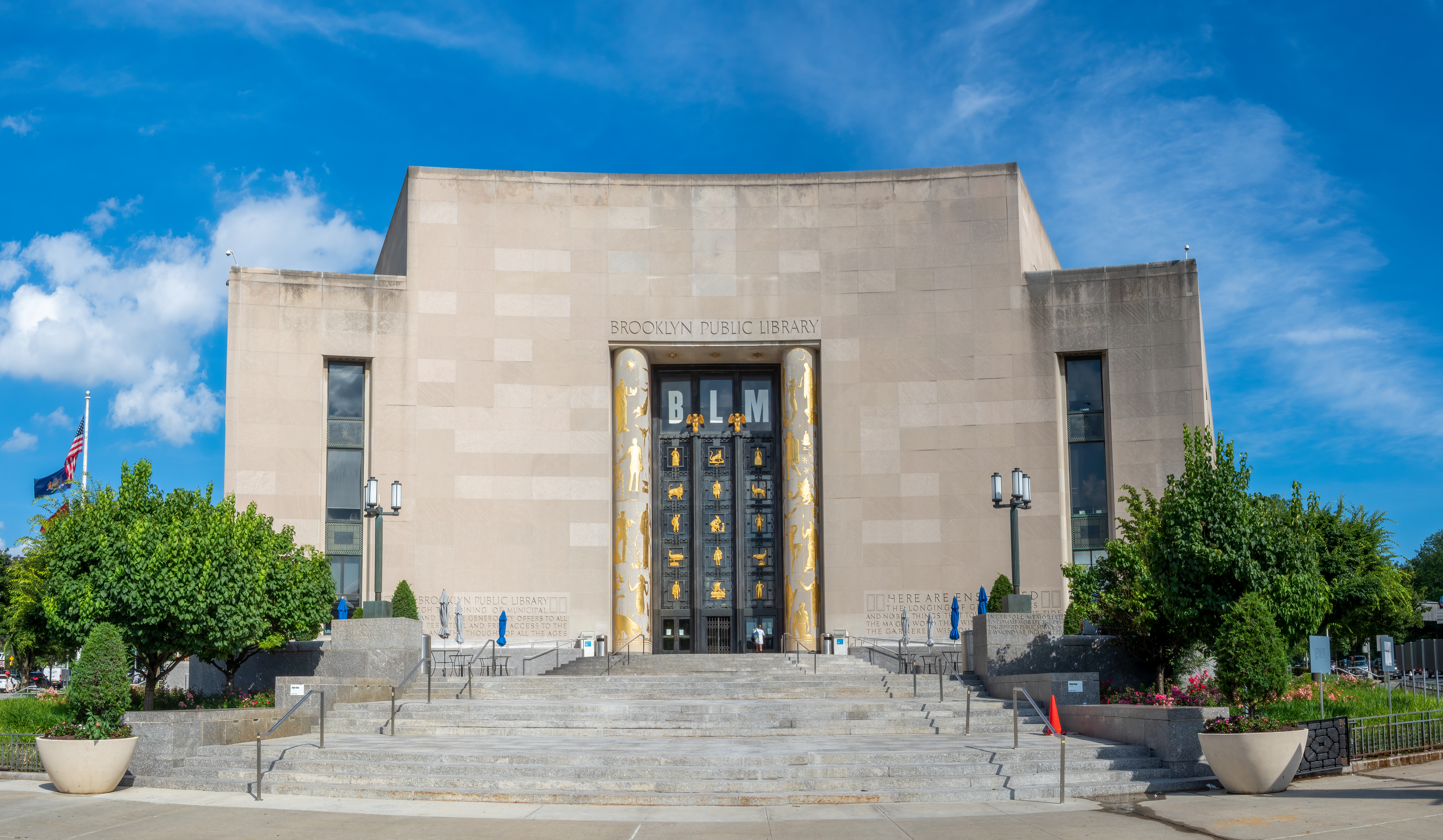
The Central branch of the Brooklyn Public Library.

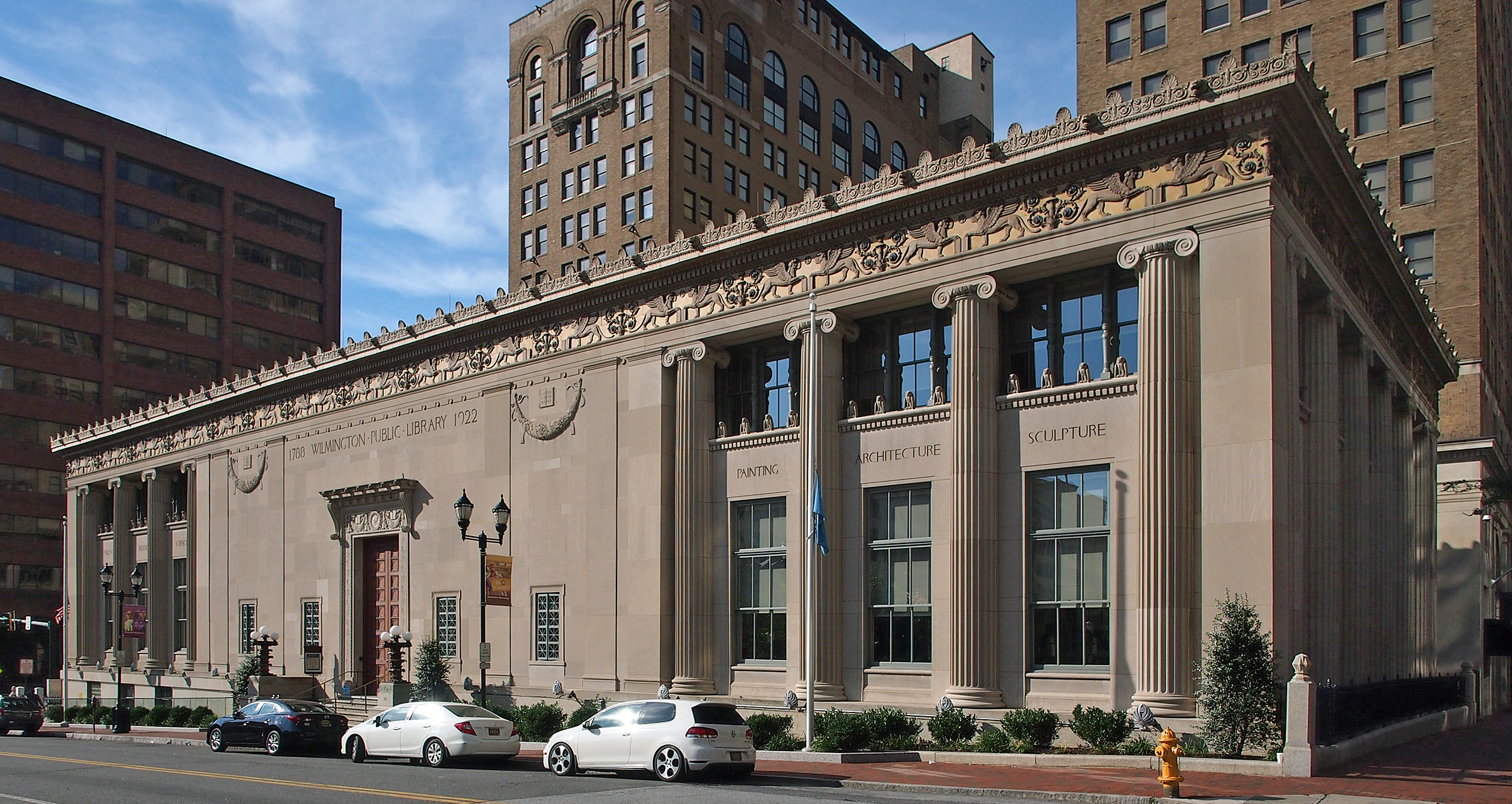
Wilmington Public Library

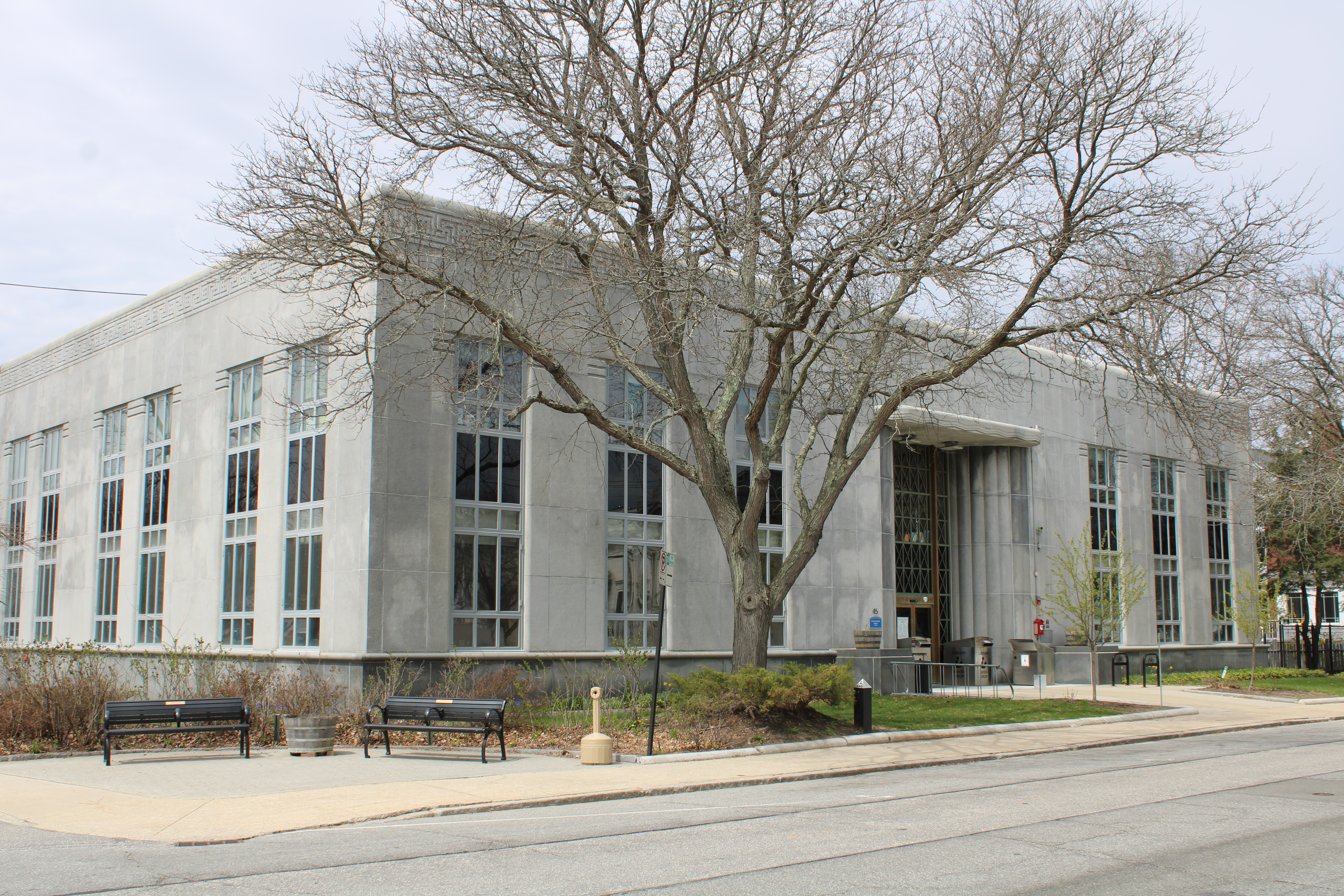
Concord Public Library

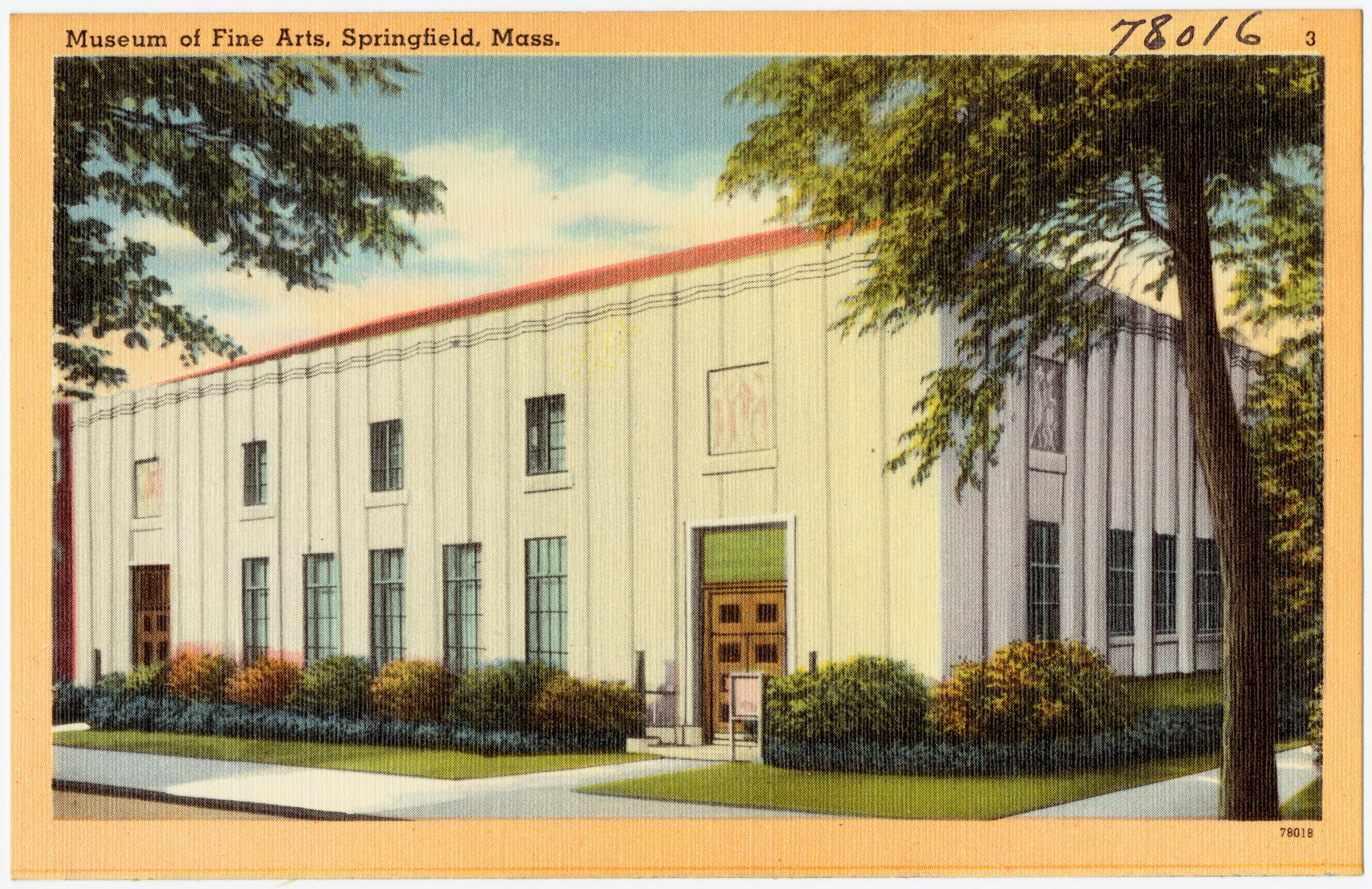
Museum of Fine Arts, Springfield, Massachusetts
