= Dionne Mack =

American librarian

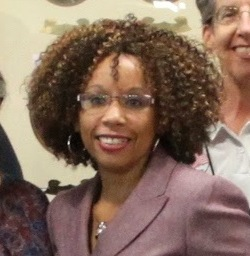
- Born: 1973 (age 52–53); South Carolina, U.S.
- Other name: Dionne Mack-Harvin
- Occupations: Librarian, City Manager
- Known for: first African American woman to head a major library system in New York

Dionne Mack (born 1973), briefly known as Dionne Mack-Harvin, is an American librarian and the city manager of the city of El Paso, Texas since August 2024. She was the executive director of the Brooklyn Public Library from 2007 to 2011 and the first African-American woman to head a major library system in the state of the New York. Prior to becoming city manager of El Paso, she served as deputy city manager of the city from July 2017 to August 2024.

== Early life and education ==
Mack was born and spent the early part of her childhood in South Carolina. At age 11, her parents separated and she moved to Harlem, New York with her mother and siblings. Her father was a truck driver and her mother was a licensed practical nurse. She was the first person in her family to attend college and received her bachelor's degree from SUNY College at Brockport. She received her master of library science degree from Rockefeller College of Public Affairs and Policy.

== Career ==
She began work as an entry-level librarian at the Crown Heights branch of the Brooklyn Public Library in 1996. She stayed in the system for several years and took multiple promotions. She was the executive director of the library system for three years after a one-year interim contract in the position. She oversaw 60 branches, 1,700 employees, and a $103 million budget.

Mack hired a downsizing firm to help lay off 13 staffers due to a budget shortfall. A Washington Post article detailed the firings and used language that made those fired identifiable. After the article's publication, Mack stated that she had never given the journalist access for the story, which the reporter and library communications manager refuted. This was considered an "embarrassment" to the library system, and according to the New York Daily News, may be why Mack chose to abruptly resign right as her contract came up for renewal.

Mack took the position of Public Library Director of El Paso Public Library in January 2011. She became the deputy city manager of public safety and support services of El Paso on July 17, 2017. In August 2024, she was appointed as El Paso's city manager.

She was named to the Crain's New York 40 under 40 business leader list in 2008.

== Personal life ==
Mack was married to Ray Harvin. They have one son, Naeem.
