= Francis Keally =

American architect (1889-1978)

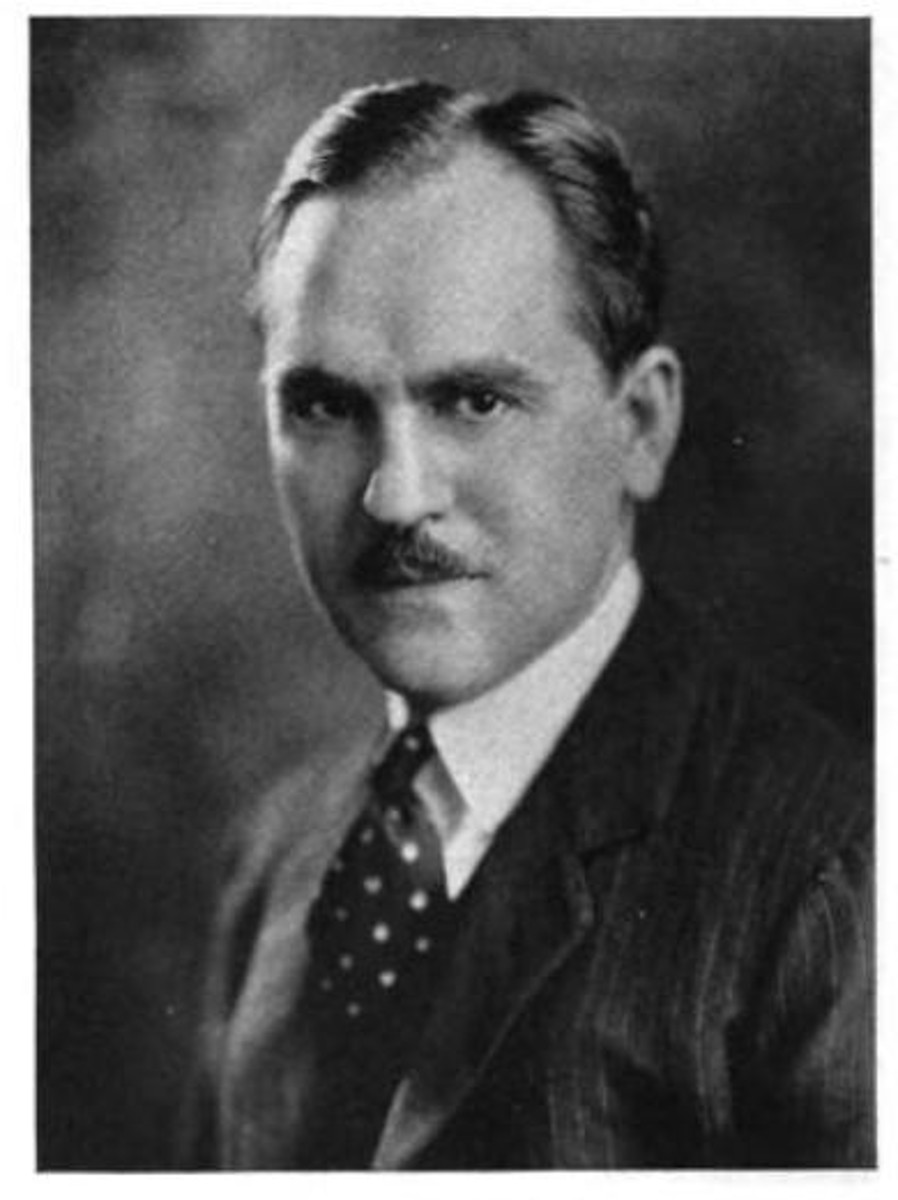
Francis Keally c. 1924

Francis J. Keally (December 3, 1889 – 1978) was an American architect and pioneering preservationist, based in New York City. Keally's design credits include the Oregon State Capitol in Salem, Oregon in 1938, in a one-time association with Trowbridge & Livingston; the Former Embassy of Iran in Washington, D.C.; and the main building of the Brooklyn Public Library.

== Life ==
Keally was born in Pittsburgh and first trained in architecture at the Carnegie Institute of Technology in 1912, then he moved to the University of Pennsylvania. Twelve pages of his travel sketches from two years in Europe were published in Pencil Points of June 1928, raising his professional profile.

Keally's first major commission was won in a national competition with 75 entries—a federally-funded monument to the First Permanent Settlement of the West, erected in Harrodsburg, Kentucky, in what was then Pioneer Memorial State Park. Keally's partner in the competition entry was the architectural sculptor Ulric Ellerhusen. Three years later the same team of Keally and Ellerhusen won the national competition for the Oregon State Capitol, with Keally aligning himself with the larger New York firm of Trowbridge & Livingston.

Later he partnered with Alfred Morton Githens. Keally taught at Columbia University and the University of Minnesota, and he served as president of the Municipal Art Society of New York. He became a Fellow of the American Institute of Architects in 1948.

== Work ==
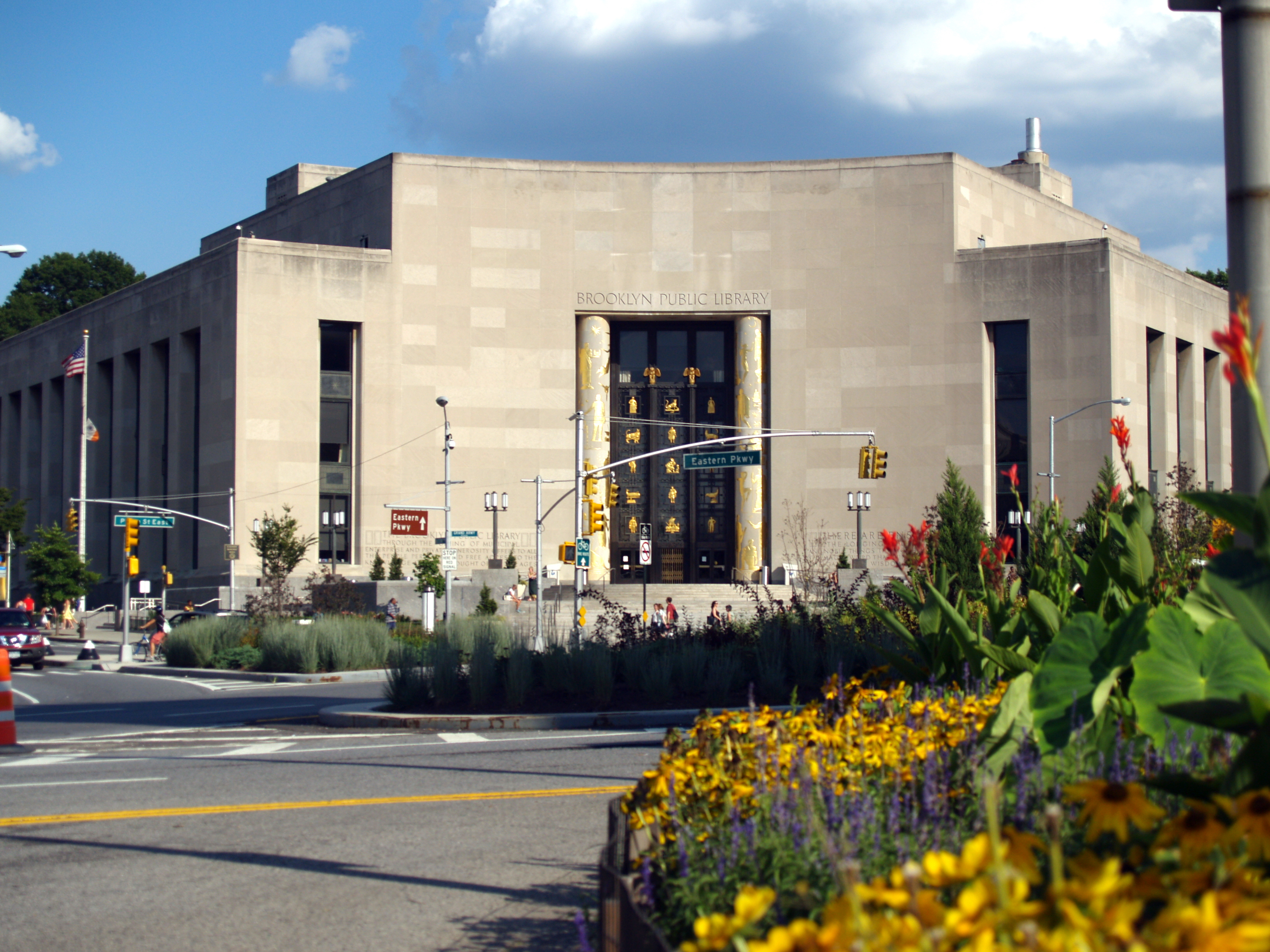
Brooklyn Public Library

- four-story parish story addition to the St. Luke's Lutheran Church, West 46th Street, NYC, 1922
- monument to the First Permanent Settlement of the West, Harrodsburg, Kentucky, 1935
- Oregon State Capitol, as design architect, with Trowbridge & Livingston, Salem, Oregon, 1938
- Barbour Residence, 1119 Scenic Drive, Sequoyah Hills, Knoxville, Tennessee, with landscape architect Arthur F. Brinkerhoff, 1940
- Virginia State Library, Richmond, Virginia, 1940 (Githens & Keally)
- main building of the Brooklyn Public Library. Grand Army Plaza, Brooklyn, New York, 1941 (Githens & Keally)
- Joint University Library, consolidating the libraries of Vanderbilt University, George Peabody College for Teachers, and Scarritt College for Christian Workers, now part of the Jean and Alexander Heard Library, with local architect Henry C. Hibbs as primary designer and Githens & Keally as consulting library specialists, 1941
- Ford Foundation Library a.k.a. "Henry-Ford-Bau", Free University of Berlin, Berlin, Germany, as library consultant associated with German architects Sobotka, Mueller, 1954
- Amerika-Gedenkbibliothek (America Memorial Library), Berlin, Germany, as library consultant associated with German architects Jobst Kreuer Wille Bornemann, 1954
- Luxembourg American Cemetery and Memorial, Hamm, Luxembourg, one of the American Battle Monuments, dedicated 1960 (Keally & Patterson)
- Former Embassy of Iran in Washington, D.C., 1962
- additions to the Detroit Public Library, Detroit, Michigan, with Cass Gilbert Jr., completed 1963
- St. John the Theologian Greek Orthodox Church, 353 E. Clinton Avenue, Tenafly, New Jersey, 1966
- Concord, New Hampshire public library (Githens & Keally)
