= Roscoe Conkling Ensign Brown =

American editor (1873–1946)

Roscoe Conkling Ensign Brown (August 23, 1867 in Scottsville, New York – December 14, 1946) was the managing editor and assistant editor of the New York Tribune and professor of journalism at Columbia University.

Brown graduated from the University of Rochester in 1889, and joined the Tribune later that year.
