= Brooklyn Public Library =

Library system in Brooklyn, New York

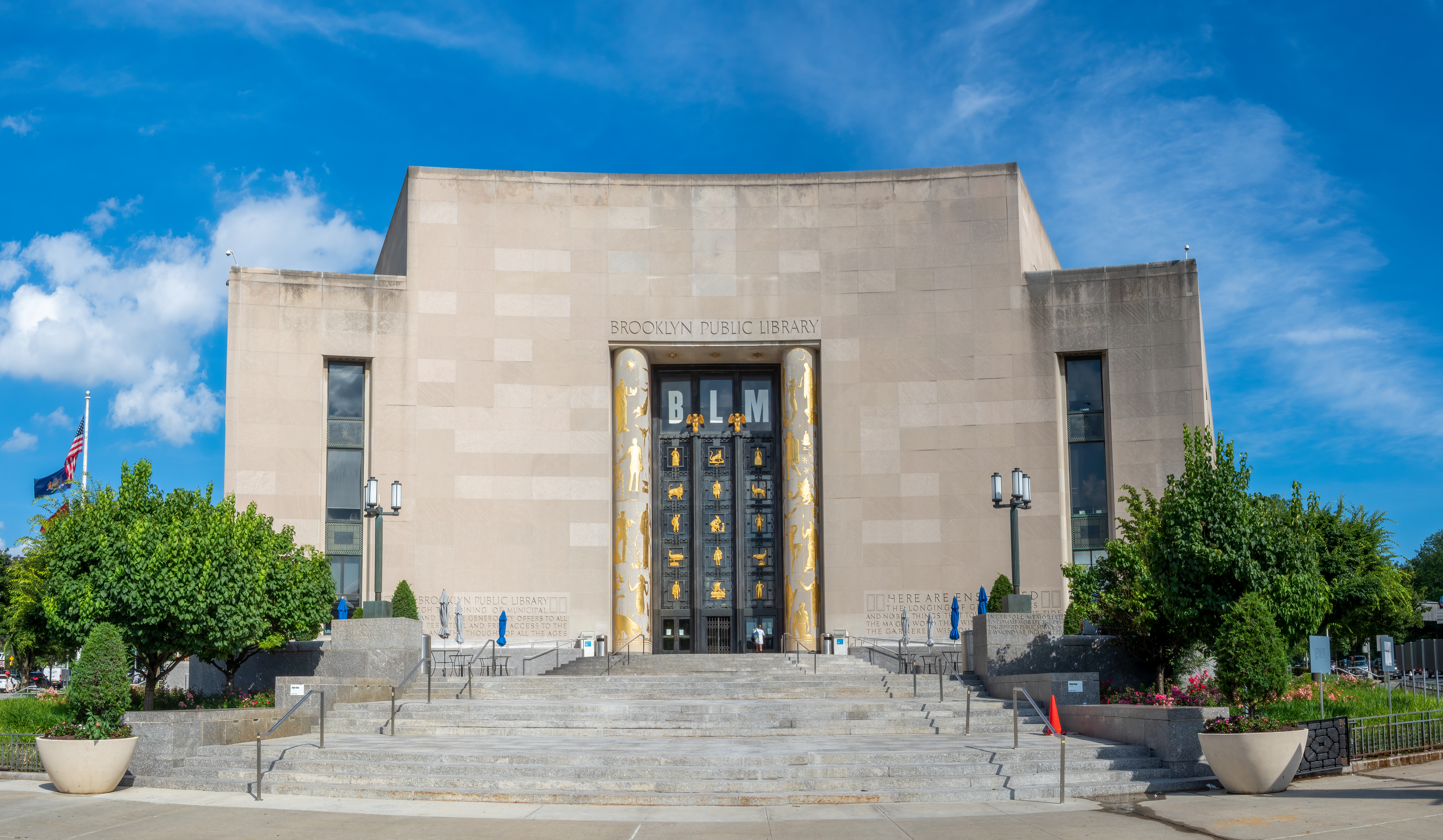
- Brooklyn Central Library
- 40°40′21″N 73°58′06″W
- Location: Brooklyn, New York City
- Established: 1896
- Branches: 61

Collection
- Size: 5,045,500 items

Access and use
- Population served: 2,565,635

Other information
- Director: Linda E. Johnson (2010–present)
- Website: bklynlibrary.org

The Brooklyn Public Library is the public library system of the New York City borough of Brooklyn. It is the sixteenth largest public library system in the United States by holding and the seventh by number of visitors. Like the two other public library systems in New York City, it is an independent nonprofit organization that is funded by the city and state governments, the federal government, and private donors. In marketing materials, the library styles its name as Bklyn Public Library.

== History ==
In 1852, several prominent citizens established the "Brooklyn Athenaeum and Reading Room" for the instruction of young men. It was as was the practice in those times, a private, subscription library for members, who were recruited and encouraged by the rising mercantile and business class of young men, to continue by constant reading whatever formal education they had received through a university, college, high school/private academy, or trade school. Its collections focused on the liberal arts and the humanities such as biography, economics, history, literature, philosophy, and other applications later labeled social studies.

Five years later, in 1857, another group of young men, along with businessmen, manufacturers, and merchants, founded the "Brooklyn Mercantile Library Association of the City of Brooklyn", with holdings more pronounced in the business, commercial, economics, mathematical, scientific, and technical fields. The Librarian-in-Charge was Stephen Buttrick Noyes, who later went to the Library of Congress in 1866 but returned to Brooklyn three years later, in 1869. This collection and the previous one were merged in 1869 and later moved to a headquarters building on Montague Street. In 1878, the Library Associations were renamed the "Brooklyn Public Library". Stephen Buttrick Noyes commenced developing an extensive catalog for the collections which he completed in 1888.

The first free public library in Brooklyn was that of Pratt Institute, a collegiate institute founded by Charles Pratt in 1888. Available not only for its own students and faculty, the library was also open to the general public at that early time.

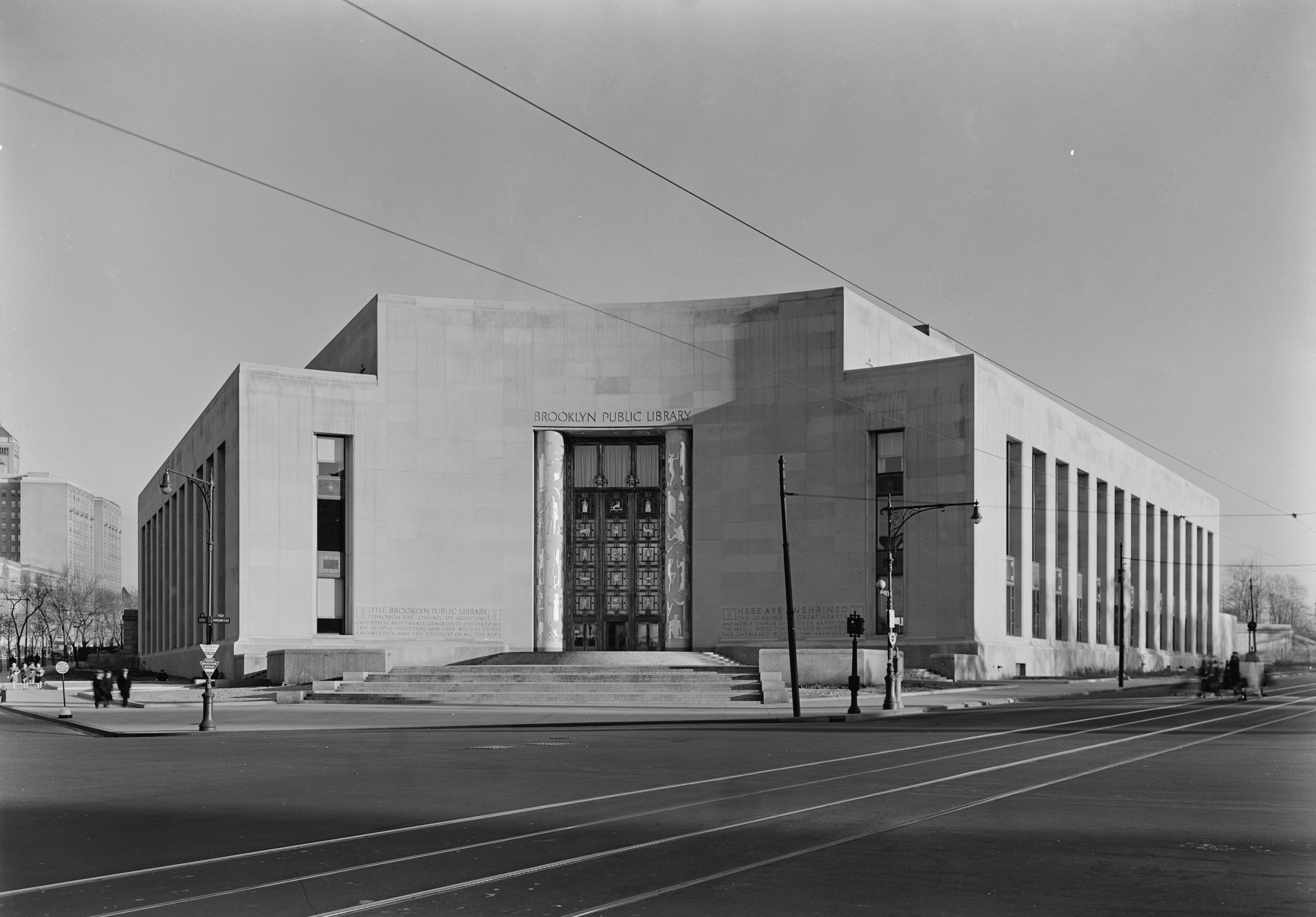
Brooklyn Public Library's Central Library in January 1941 shortly before it opened

The Brooklyn Public Library system was approved by an Act of Legislature of the State of New York on May 3, 1892. The Brooklyn Common Council then passed a resolution for the establishment of the Brooklyn Public Library on November 30, 1896, with Marie E. Craigie as the first director. The library was re-incorporated in 1902.

The first main branch ("central library") moved among various buildings, including a former mansion at 26 Brevoort Place. In 1901, the businessman and philanthropist Andrew Carnegie donated $1.6 million, which helped fund the development and construction of 21 Carnegie neighborhood library branches through 1923.

In 2020, Brooklyn Public Library made an agreement to merge its archives and special collections division, the Brooklyn Collection, with the Brooklyn Historical Society. The new entity is called the Center for Brooklyn History.

== Branches ==
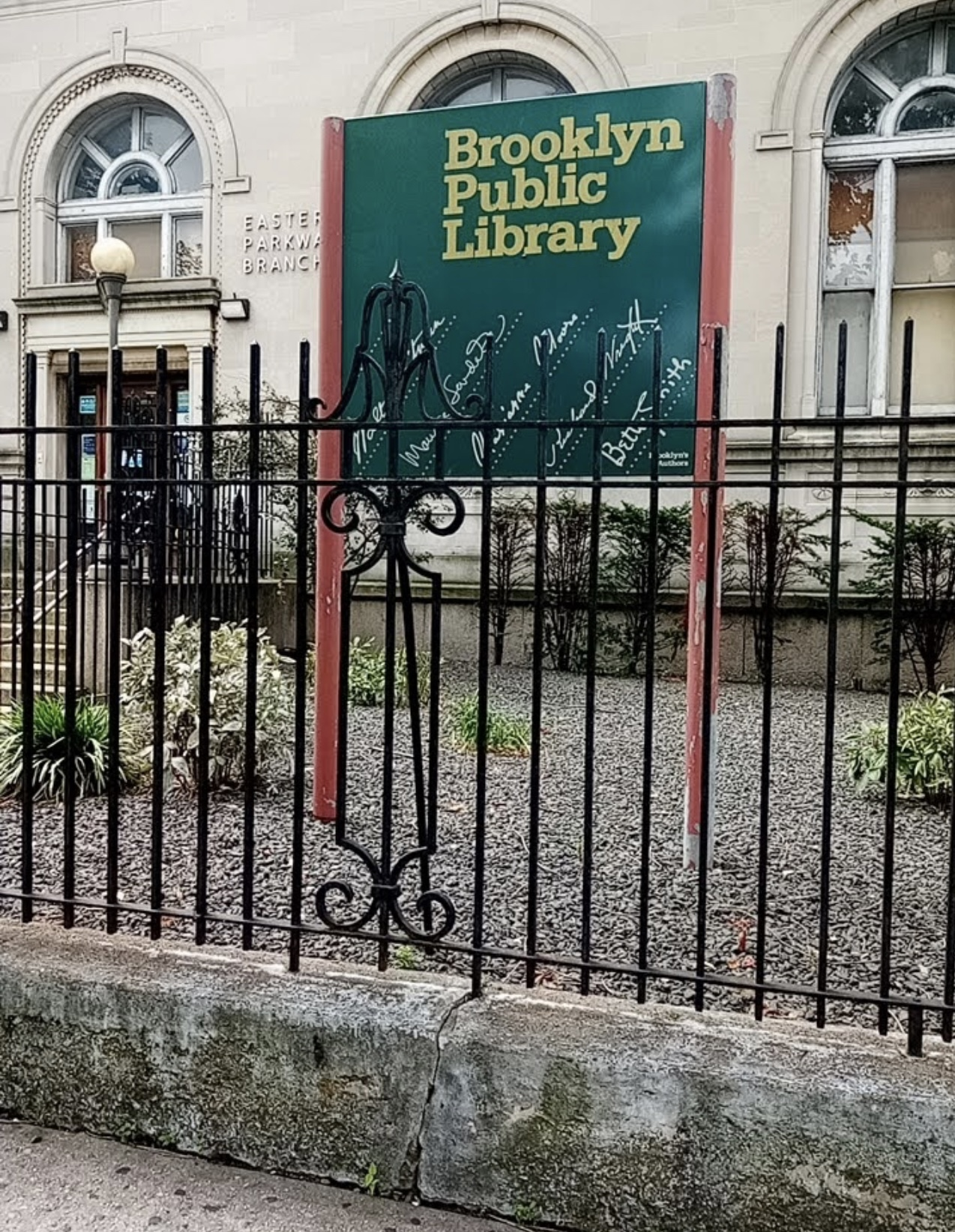
An example of Brooklyn Public Library branch signage, located outside the Eastern Parkway Branch.

There are 61 neighborhood branches throughout the borough, of which many are Carnegie libraries. The library has four bookmobiles, including the Kidsmobile, which carries children's materials, and the Bibliobús, which carries a Spanish language collection.

=== Central Library ===
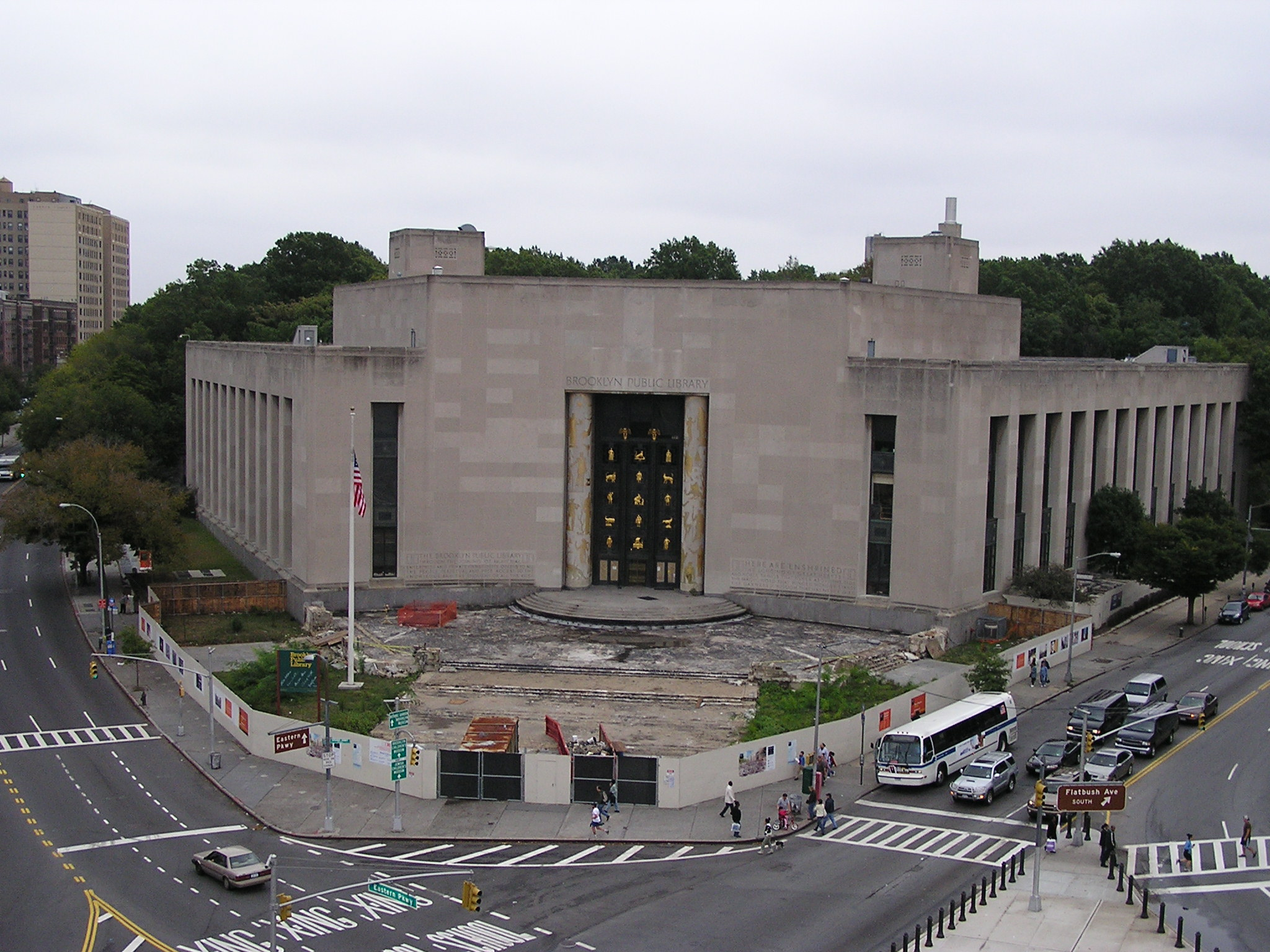
The Central Library at Grand Army Plaza in October 2005, during construction of a new entrance plaza and underground auditorium

Located at Flatbush Avenue and Eastern Parkway on Grand Army Plaza near the Prospect Heights, Crown Heights, Flatbush, and Park Slope neighborhoods, Brooklyn Public Library's Central Library contains over a million cataloged books, magazines, and multimedia materials.

The Brooklyn Collection holds the manuscripts and archives for the Brooklyn Public Library and is located at the Central Branch. The Brooklyn Collection holds over a million individual items including Brooklyn Dodgers memorabilia, a collection for the Brooklyn Eagle, which Walt Whitman edited, manuscripts, maps, photographs, and other ephemeral items.

== Services ==
The Bookmobile is a 32-foot (9.8 m)-long, 11.5-foot (3.5 m)-high vehicle housing a mobile library. Carrying up to 6,000 books, the Bookmobile serves communities whose local branches are closed for renovation. The Bookmobile offers many of the services available at other branches.

The Kidsmobile is a smaller, more colorful version of the Bookmobile. During the school year, the Kidsmobile visits schools, day care centers, Head Start, after-school programs and community events. In the summer, the Kidsmobile also travels to parks and camps. In addition to books, the Kidsmobile offers storytelling and arts and crafts.

The Bibliobús is a mobile Spanish-language library. It brings books and other media to Spanish-speaking communities in Brooklyn. The Bibliobús serves sites such as schools, daycares, community-based organizations, senior centers, nonprofit organizations, and community events.

The Shelby White and Leon Levy Information Commons opened at Central Library on January 15, 2013. It features an open workspace with 25 computers and seating and outlets for more than 70 laptop users; 7 meeting rooms, including one that doubles as a recording studio; and a 36-seat training lab.

The library's Learning Centers provide adult literacy and adult education services for free.

Every Brooklyn Public Library branch is equipped with a "New Americans Corner" that provides information on immigration, citizenship and other materials.

In 2022, the Brooklyn Public Library began allowing cardholders to borrow vinyl records from its collection. Since 2025, the BPL has also allowed cardholders to borrow a limited number of artworks.

In 2026, Brooklyn Public Library launched its first ever craft library.

=== Books Unbanned ===
On July 15, 2022, Brooklyn Public Library introduced the Books Unbanned initiative which waived the $50 fee for out-of-state library cards for people in the United States between the ages of 13 and 21. The program allows teens and young adults to access ebooks and audiobooks for free. A spokesperson said that the Brooklyn Public Library intended to counteract the "increasingly coordinated and effective effort to remove books tackling a wide range of topics from library shelves." The library cited the American Library Association's Freedom to Read Statement as a driving force behind the decision, noting the "729 challenges to library, school and university materials and services in 2021, resulting in more than 1,597 individual book challenges or removals."

== Administration ==
Brooklyn Public Library's governing board is the board of trustees, consisting of 38 members, all serving in non-salaried positions. The Mayor and the Brooklyn Borough President each appoint eleven of the trustees. These appointed trustees elect twelve additional board members to serve. The mayor, New York City Comptroller, Speaker of the City Council and Brooklyn Borough President are ex officio members of the board. All non-ex officio members of the board serve three-year terms.

Linda E. Johnson was named president and CEO on August 16, 2011, after having served as the institution's interim executive director since July 1, 2010. She replaced Dionne Mack-Harvin, who served as executive director from March 2007. Mack-Harvin was the first African American woman to lead a major public library system in New York state. Previously, Ginnie Cooper had been the executive director of the Brooklyn Public Library since January 2003. Other notable executive directors include Kenneth Duchac, who ran the system from 1970 until his retirement in 1986.

=== List of directors ===
- Mary E. Craigie
- Arthur E. Bostwick (1899–1901)
- Frank Pierce Hill (1901–1930)
- Milton J. Ferguson (1930–1949)
- Francis R. St. John (1949–1963)
- John Ames Humphry (1964–?)
- John C Frantz (?)
- Kenneth Farnham Duchac (1970–1986)
- Larry Brandwein (1987–1994)
- Martin Gomez (1995–2002)
- Ginnie Cooper (2003–2007)
- Dionne Mack-Harvin (2007–2010)
- Linda E. Johnson (2011–present)

== Other New York City library systems ==
The Brooklyn Public Library is one of three separate and independent public library systems in New York City. The other two are the New York Public Library (NYPL), serving the Bronx, Manhattan, and Staten Island, and the Queens Public Library, serving Queens. The Brooklyn and Queens Public Library cards can be accepted by the NYPL, once they are linked to the NYPL system at any NYPL branch.

== See also ==
- Brooklyn Visual Heritage
- List of Brooklyn Public Library branches
